= List of moths of Chile (Cossidae) =

This is a list of the moths of family Cossidae which are found in Chile. It also acts as an index to the species articles and forms part of the full List of moths of Chile. Subfamilies are listed alphabetically.

== Subfamily Chilecomadiinae ==
- Chilecomadia moorei (Silva, 1915)
- Chilecomadia valdiviana (Philippi, 1859)
- Rhizocossus munroei Clench, 1957

== Subfamily Hypoptinae ==
- Breyeriana ambigua (Hubner, 1818)
- Breyeriana cistransandina Orfila, 1957
- Givira albosignata Ureta, 1957
- Givira australis Ureta, 1957
- Givira brunneoguttata Gentili, 1989
- Givira leonera Clench, 1957
- Givira vicunensis Ureta, 1957
- Hypopta albescens (Ureta, 1957)
- Hypopta brunneomaculata Dyar, 1828
- Hypopta chiclin Dognin, 1905
- Philanglaus breyeri (Ureta, 1957)
- Philanglaus serenensis (Ureta, 1957)
- Philanglaus monsalvei (Ureta, 1957)
- Philanglaus ornatus Butler, 1882
- Philanglaus terranea (Ureta, 1957)
- Philiodoron cinereum Clench, 1957
- Philiodoron frater Clench, 1957
