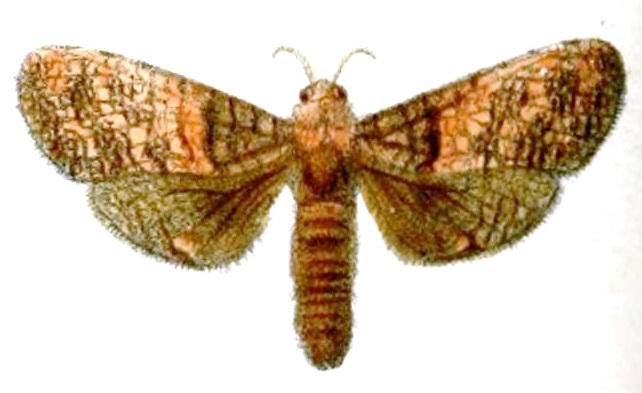
- Hypopta amundasa

Scientific classification
- Kingdom: Animalia
- Phylum: Arthropoda
- Clade: Pancrustacea
- Class: Insecta
- Order: Lepidoptera
- Family: Cossidae
- Subfamily: Hypoptinae
- Genus: Hypopta; Hübner, 1818

= Hypopta =

Moth genus in family Cossidae

Hypopta is a genus of moths in the family Cossidae.

== Species ==
- Hypopta actileuca Dyar, 1918
- Hypopta aethiops Herrich-Schäffer, 1855
- Hypopta albicosta Hering, 1923
- Hypopta albipuncta Schaus, 1921
- Hypopta ambigua Hübner, 1818
- Hypopta amundasa Druce, 1890
- Hypopta aquila Dognin, 1916
- Hypopta brunneomaculata (Dyar & Schaus, 1937)
- Hypopta caestoides Herrich-Schäffer, 1853
- Hypopta centrosoma Dyar, 1925
- Hypopta cinerea Schaus, 1911
- Hypopta clymene Schaus, 1921
- Hypopta corrientina Berg, 1882
- Hypopta crassiplaga Schaus, 1905
- Hypopta delicata Schaus, 1921
- Hypopta garsasia Dognin, 1916
- Hypopta giacomelli Köhler, 1924
- Hypopta guiguasia Dognin, 1916
- Hypopta inguromorpha Schaus, 1905
- Hypopta invida Dognin, 1916
- Hypopta invidiosa Dognin, 1923
- Hypopta mendosensis Berg, 1882
- Hypopta monsalvei Ureta, 1957
- Hypopta nigrisparsata Dognin, 1816
- Hypopta pallidicosta (Schaus, 1901)
- Hypopta palmata Barnes & McDunnough, 1910
- Hypopta racana Dognin, 1920
- Hypopta ramulosa Dognin, 1920
- Hypopta rubiginosa Herrich-Schäffer, 1853
- Hypopta selenophora Hering, 1923
- Hypopta sibirica Alphéraky, 1895
- Hypopta superba Berg, 1882
- Hypopta triarcatata Schaus, 1905
- Hypopta variegata Köhler, 1924
- Hypopta vassilia Schaus, 1921

== Former species ==
- Hypopta agavis
- Hypopta anna Dyar, 1898
- Hypopta chilodora Dyar, 1910
- Hypopta clathrata Dognin, 1910
- Hypopta cognata Krüger, 1939
- Hypopta ethela Neumoegen & Dyar, 1894
- Hypopta francesca Dyar, 1909
- Hypopta herzi Alphéraky, 1893
- Hypopta intractatus Staudinger, 1887
- Hypopta itzalana Strecker, 1900
- Hypopta lignosus Brandt, 1938
- Hypopta mussolinii Turati, 1927
- Hypopta nana Strecker, 1876
- Hypopta nycteris John, 1923
- Hypopta salome Dyar, 1910
- Hypopta sterila Dognin, 1910
- Hypopta sumbannus Alphéraky & Rothschild, 1912
- Hypopta tekkensis Alphéraky & Rothschild, 1912
- Hypopta theodori Dyar, 1893
- Hypopta thrips Hübner, 1818
- Hypopta vaulogeri Staudinger, 1897
- Hypopta zoroastres Grum-Grshimailo, 1902
