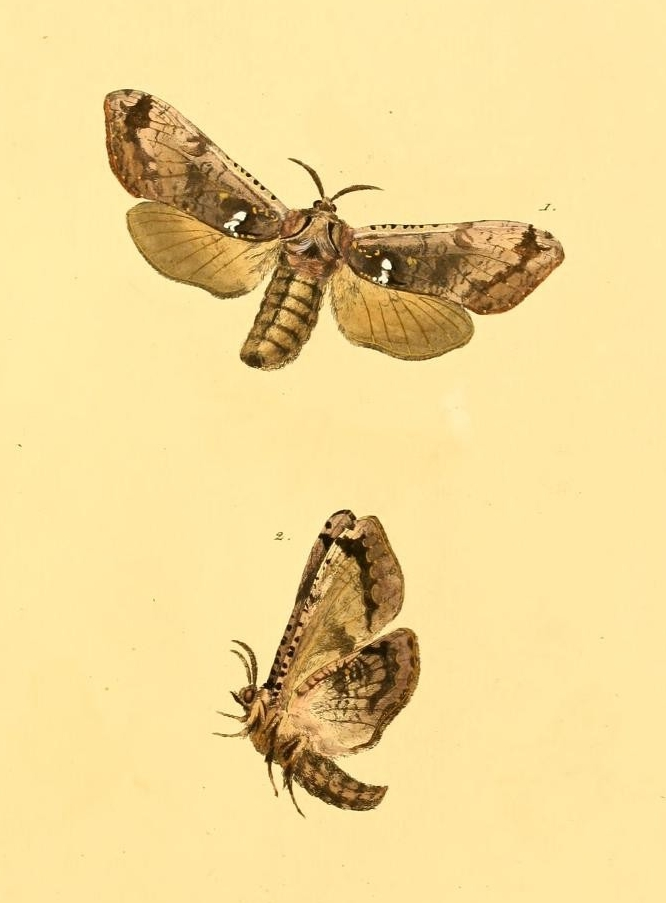
- Langsdorfia franckii, front and profile view

Scientific classification
- Kingdom: Animalia
- Phylum: Arthropoda
- Clade: Pancrustacea
- Class: Insecta
- Order: Lepidoptera
- Family: Cossidae
- Subfamily: Hypoptinae
- Genus: Langsdorfia; Hübner, 1821

Synonyms
- Philanglaus Butler, 1882

= Langsdorfia =

Moth genus in family Cossidae

Langsdorfia is a genus of moths in the family Cossidae.

== Species ==
- Langsdorfia adornata Dognin, 1889
- Langsdorfia albescens Ureta, 1957
- Langsdorfia andensis Felder, 1874
- Langsdorfia argentata Köhler, 1924
- Langsdorfia beatrix Schaus, 1921
- Langsdorfia bellaria Dognin, 1911
- Langsdorfia buckleyi Druce, 1901
- Langsdorfia coresa Schaus, 1901
- Langsdorfia dukinfieldi Schaus, 1894
- Langsdorfia forreri Druce, 1887
- Langsdorfia franckii Hübner, 1824
- Langsdorfia garleppi Staudinger
- Langsdorfia invetita Dognin, 1923
- Langsdorfia leucrocraspedontis Zukowsky, 1954
- Langsdorfia malina Dognin, 1891
- Langsdorfia marmorata Maasen, 1890
- Langsdorfia metana Dognin, 1910
- Langsdorfia minima Dognin, 1891
- Langsdorfia ornatus Butler, 1882
- Langsdorfia pallida Druce, 1911
- Langsdorfia penai Clench, 1957
- Langsdorfia rufescens Druce, 1901
- Langsdorfia sieglinda Schaus, 1934
- Langsdorfia tessellata E. D. Jones, 1912
- Langsdorfia xylodopoecila Zukowsky, 1954

== Former species ==
- Langsdorfia aroa Schaus, 1894
- Langsdorfia polybia Schaus, 1892
