= Inguromorpha =

Scientific classification
- Domain: Eukaryota
- Kingdom: Animalia
- Phylum: Arthropoda
- Class: Insecta
- Order: Lepidoptera
- Family: Cossidae
- Subfamily: Hypoptinae
- Genus: Inguromorpha; Edwards, 1888

Synonyms
- Ravigia Ravigia, 1905; Pomeria Barnes & McDunnough, 1911

Moth genus in family Cossidae

Inguromorpha is a genus of moths in the family Cossidae.

== Species ==
- Inguromorpha arcifera (Dyar, 1906)
- Inguromorpha basalis Walker, 1856
- Inguromorpha buboa Schaus, 1934
- Inguromorpha itzalana (Strecker, 1900)
- Inguromorpha polybia (Schaus, 1892)
- Inguromorpha polybioides (Schaus, 1911)
- Inguromorpha roseobrunnea (Dognin, 1917)
- Inguromorpha sterila (Dognin 1910)

== Former species ==
- Inguromorpha arbeloides Dyar, 1899
