= Givira rufiflava =

Scientific classification
- Kingdom: Animalia
- Phylum: Arthropoda
- Clade: Pancrustacea
- Class: Insecta
- Order: Lepidoptera
- Family: Cossidae
- Genus: Givira
- Species: G. rufiflava

Binomial name
- Givira rufiflava (Dognin, 1917)

Synonyms
- Lentagena rufiflava Dognin, 1917

Species of moth

Givira rufiflava is a moth in the family Cossidae. It is found in French Guiana.
