= Langsdorfia adornata =

Scientific classification
- Kingdom: Animalia
- Phylum: Arthropoda
- Class: Insecta
- Order: Lepidoptera
- Family: Cossidae
- Genus: Langsdorfia
- Species: L. adornata

Binomial name
- Langsdorfia adornata Dognin, 1889

Species of moth

Langsdorfia adornata is a moth in the family Cossidae. It is found in Ecuador (Loja Province).
