= Langsdorfia malina =

Scientific classification
- Kingdom: Animalia
- Phylum: Arthropoda
- Class: Insecta
- Order: Lepidoptera
- Family: Cossidae
- Genus: Langsdorfia
- Species: L. malina

Binomial name
- Langsdorfia malina Dognin, 1891

Species of moth

Langsdorfia malina is a moth in the family Cossidae. It is found in Ecuador (Loja Province).
