= Hypopta mendosensis =

Scientific classification
- Kingdom: Animalia
- Phylum: Arthropoda
- Clade: Pancrustacea
- Class: Insecta
- Order: Lepidoptera
- Family: Cossidae
- Genus: Hypopta
- Species: H. mendosensis

Binomial name
- Hypopta mendosensis Berg, 1882

Species of moth

Hypopta mendosensis is a moth in the family Cossidae. It is found in Argentina.
