= Psychogena =

Scientific classification
- Kingdom: Animalia
- Phylum: Arthropoda
- Class: Insecta
- Order: Lepidoptera
- Family: Cossidae
- Subfamily: Hypoptinae
- Genus: Psychogena; Schaus, 1911

Moth genus in family Cossidae

Psychogena is a genus of moths in the family Cossidae.

== Species ==
- Psychogena duplex (Schaus, 1905)
- Psychogena miranda Schaus, 1911
