= Miacorella =

Scientific classification
- Kingdom: Animalia
- Phylum: Arthropoda
- Clade: Pancrustacea
- Class: Insecta
- Order: Lepidoptera
- Family: Cossidae
- Subfamily: Chilecomadiinae
- Genus: Miacorella; Penco, Yakovlev & Naydenov, 2020
- Species: M. leucocraspedontis

Binomial name
- Miacorella leucocraspedontis (Zukowsky, 1954)

Genus of moths

Miacorella is a monotypic genus of cossid moths. It contains a single species, Miacorella leucocraspedontis.
