= Givira sobrana =

Scientific classification
- Kingdom: Animalia
- Phylum: Arthropoda
- Clade: Pancrustacea
- Class: Insecta
- Order: Lepidoptera
- Family: Cossidae
- Genus: Givira
- Species: G. sobrana

Binomial name
- Givira sobrana (Schaus, 1905)

Synonyms
- Philanglaus sobrana Schaus, 1905; Langsdorfia sobrana

Species of moth

Givira sobrana is a moth in the family Cossidae. It is found in French Guiana.
