= Hypopta variegata =

Scientific classification
- Domain: Eukaryota
- Kingdom: Animalia
- Phylum: Arthropoda
- Class: Insecta
- Order: Lepidoptera
- Family: Cossidae
- Genus: Hypopta
- Species: H. variegata

Binomial name
- Hypopta variegata Köhler, 1924

Species of moth

Hypopta variegata is a moth in the family Cossidae. It is found in Argentina.
