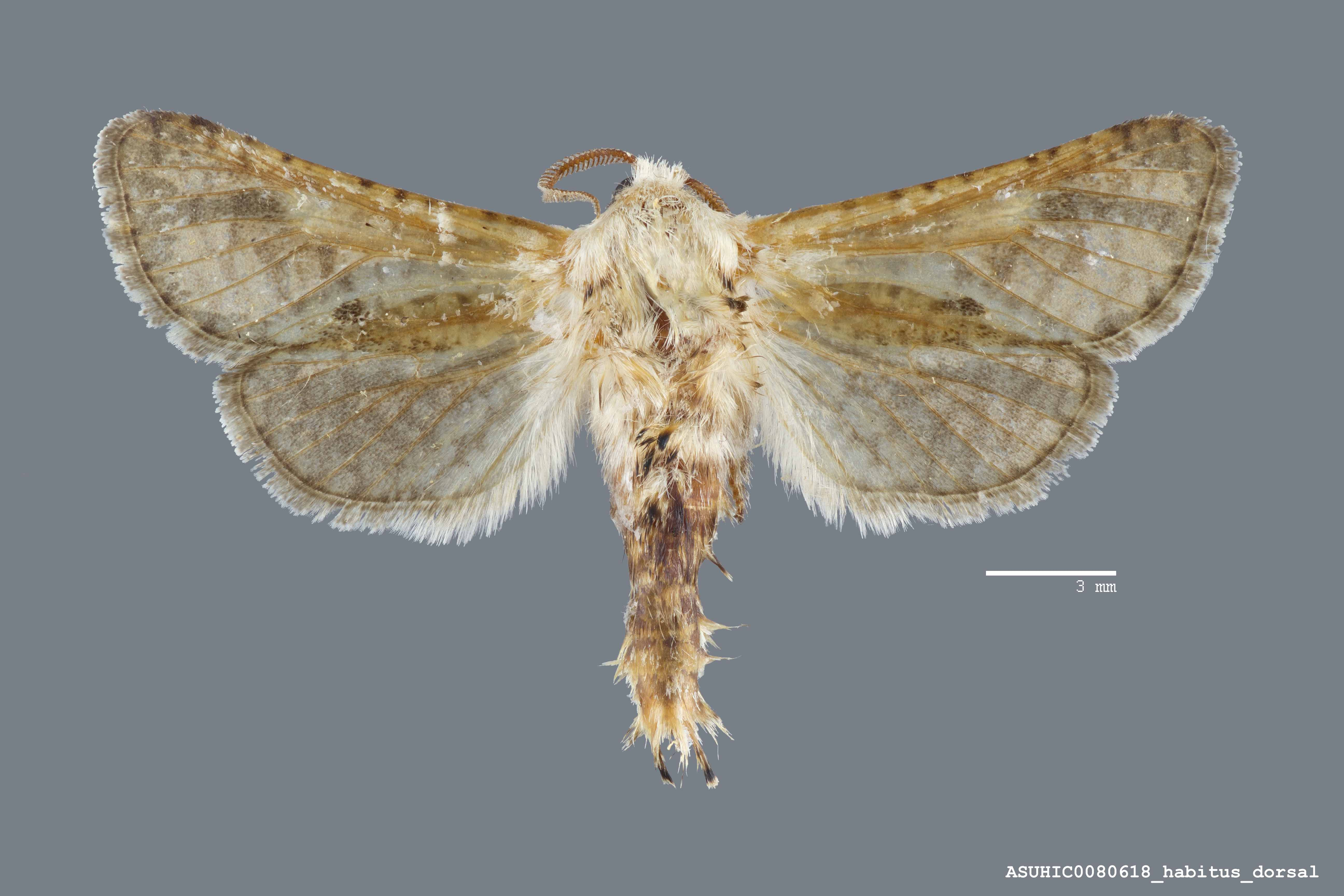

Scientific classification
- Kingdom: Animalia
- Phylum: Arthropoda
- Clade: Pancrustacea
- Class: Insecta
- Order: Lepidoptera
- Family: Cossidae
- Genus: Givira
- Species: G. cornelia

Binomial name
- Givira cornelia (Neumoegen & Dyar, 1893)

Synonyms
- Hypopta cornelia Neumoegen & Dyar, 1893; Hypopta caerulea Dalle Torre, 1923

= Givira cornelia =

Species of moth

Givira cornelia is a moth in the family Cossidae. It is found in North America, where it has been recorded from Utah, Arizona, California and Nevada.

Adults have been recorded on wing in March, May and from July to August.
