= Hypopta delicata =

Scientific classification
- Kingdom: Animalia
- Phylum: Arthropoda
- Clade: Pancrustacea
- Class: Insecta
- Order: Lepidoptera
- Family: Cossidae
- Genus: Hypopta
- Species: H. delicata

Binomial name
- Hypopta delicata Schaus, 1921

Species of moth

Hypopta delicata is a moth in the family Cossidae. It is found in Guatemala.

The wingspan is about 28 mm. The forewings are white tinged with grey below the cell and on the outer third. There are dark points between the costal and subcostal veins. The inner margin is tinged with brownish yellow to just beyond the middle. The hindwings are white with greyish spots at the veins terminally, extending on the cilia.
