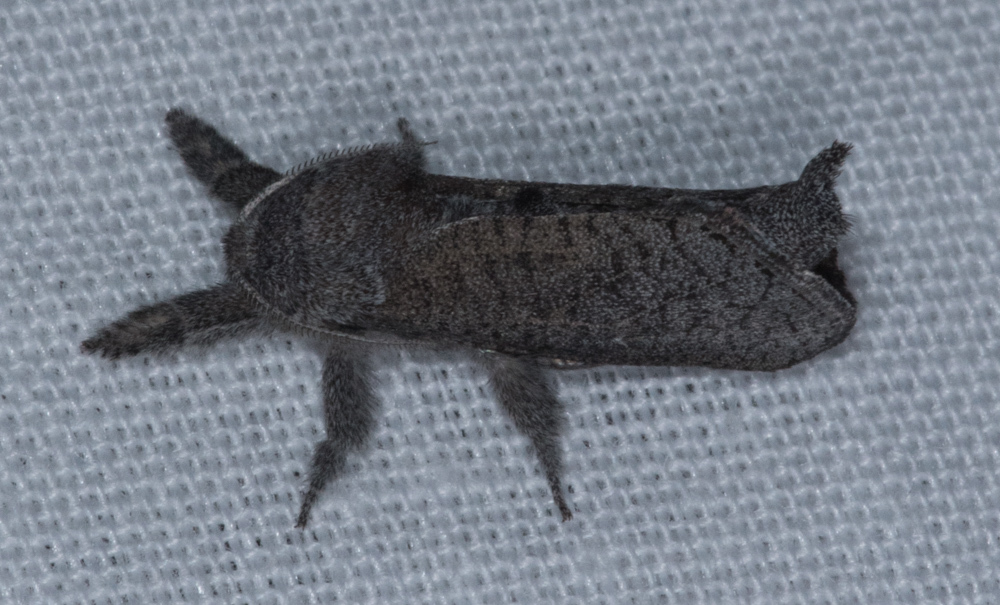

Scientific classification
- Kingdom: Animalia
- Phylum: Arthropoda
- Clade: Pancrustacea
- Class: Insecta
- Order: Lepidoptera
- Family: Cossidae
- Genus: Givira
- Species: G. lotta

Binomial name
- Givira lotta Barnes & McDunnough, 1910

= Givira lotta =

Species of moth

Givira lotta, the pine carpenterworm moth, is a moth in the family Cossidae. The species was first described by William Barnes and James Halliday McDunnough in 1910. It is found in the United States, where it has been recorded from California, Arizona, New Mexico and Colorado. The habitat consists of pine forests.

The wingspan is about 30 mm. They have been recorded on wing from June to August.

The larvae feed on Pinus ponderosa.
