= Langsdorfia andensis =

Scientific classification
- Kingdom: Animalia
- Phylum: Arthropoda
- Class: Insecta
- Order: Lepidoptera
- Family: Cossidae
- Genus: Langsdorfia
- Species: L. andensis

Binomial name
- Langsdorfia andensis Felder, 1874

Species of moth

Langsdorfia andensis is a moth in the family Cossidae. It is found in Colombia.
