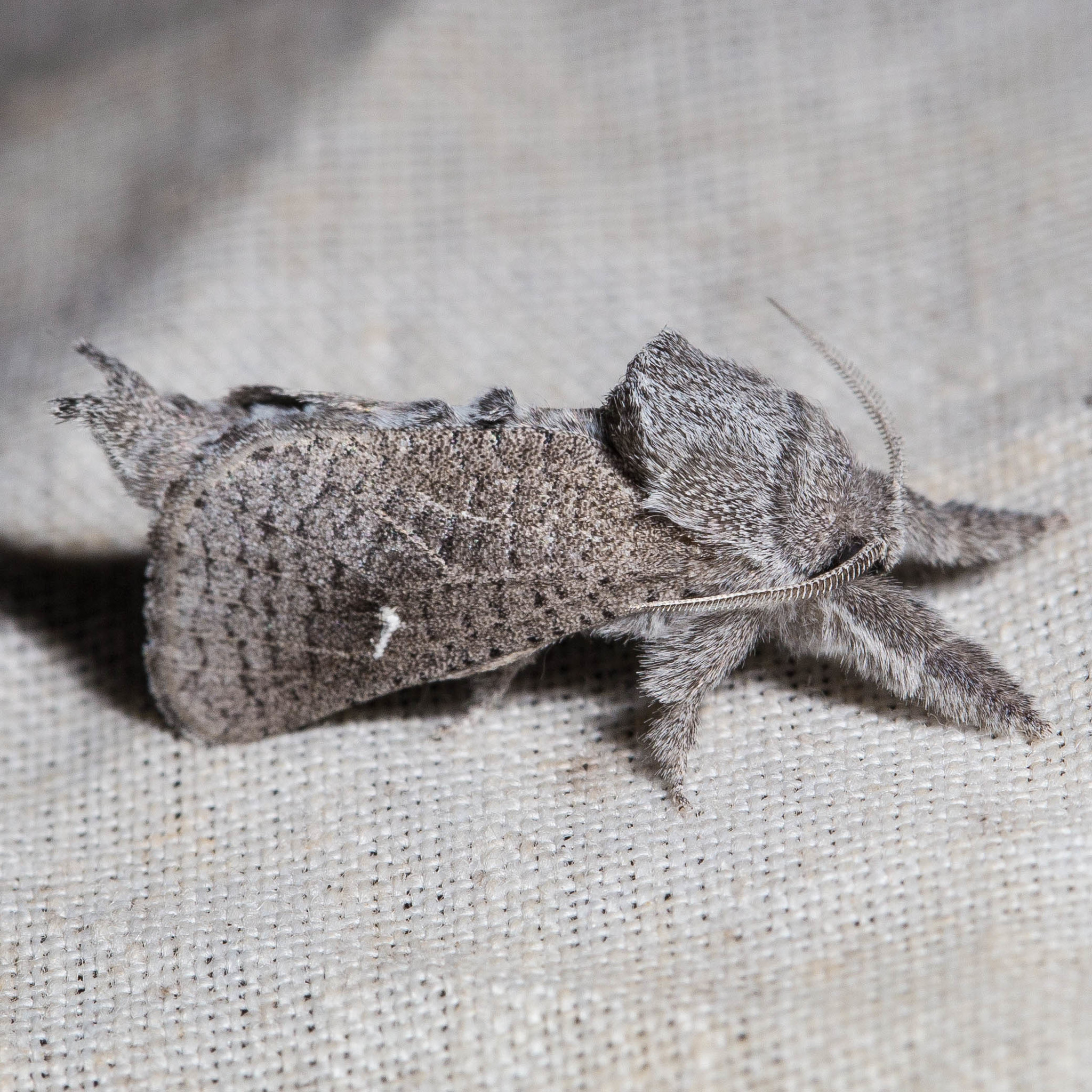

Scientific classification
- Kingdom: Animalia
- Phylum: Arthropoda
- Clade: Pancrustacea
- Class: Insecta
- Order: Lepidoptera
- Family: Cossidae
- Genus: Givira
- Species: G. marga

Binomial name
- Givira marga Barnes & McDunnough, 1910

= Givira marga =

Species of moth

Givira marga is a moth in the family Cossidae first described by William Barnes and James Halliday McDunnough in 1910. It is found in North America, where it has been recorded from California and Arizona.

The wingspan is about 30 mm. The forewings are gray, with an indistinct darker shade beyond the cell. The forewings are covered with fine black strigae, forming several bands in the outer third. The hindwings are smoky brown, but lighter along the costa. Adults have been recorded on wing from May to August.
