= Givira daphne =

Scientific classification
- Kingdom: Animalia
- Phylum: Arthropoda
- Clade: Pancrustacea
- Class: Insecta
- Order: Lepidoptera
- Family: Cossidae
- Genus: Givira
- Species: G. daphne

Binomial name
- Givira daphne (H. Druce, 1901)

Synonyms
- Duomitus daphne H. Druce, 1901; Xyleutes daphne; Endoxyla daphne

Species of moth

Givira daphne is a moth in the family Cossidae first described by Herbert Druce in 1901. It is found in Colombia.
