= Givira variabilis =

Scientific classification
- Kingdom: Animalia
- Phylum: Arthropoda
- Clade: Pancrustacea
- Class: Insecta
- Order: Lepidoptera
- Family: Cossidae
- Genus: Givira
- Species: G. variabilis

Binomial name
- Givira variabilis Köhler, 1924

Species of moth

Givira variabilis is a moth in the family Cossidae. It is found in Argentina.
