= Givira onscura =

Scientific classification
- Kingdom: Animalia
- Phylum: Arthropoda
- Clade: Pancrustacea
- Class: Insecta
- Order: Lepidoptera
- Family: Cossidae
- Genus: Givira
- Species: G. onscura

Binomial name
- Givira onscura Köhler, 1924

Species of moth

Givira onscura is a moth in the family Cossidae. It is found in Argentina. This moth was first described in 1924.
