= Givira modisma =

Scientific classification
- Kingdom: Animalia
- Phylum: Arthropoda
- Clade: Pancrustacea
- Class: Insecta
- Order: Lepidoptera
- Family: Cossidae
- Genus: Givira
- Species: G. modisma

Binomial name
- Givira modisma Schaus, 1921

Species of moth

Givira modisma is a moth in the family Cossidae. It is found in Guatemala and Costa Rica.

The wingspan is about 38 mm. The forewings are purple brown, shading to dull purple outwardly, crossed by numerous broken dull fuscous lines. The costa is somewhat paler with dark brown spots and the inner margin is fuscous grey. The hindwings are whitish yellow.
