= Givira tigrata =

Scientific classification
- Kingdom: Animalia
- Phylum: Arthropoda
- Clade: Pancrustacea
- Class: Insecta
- Order: Lepidoptera
- Family: Cossidae
- Genus: Givira
- Species: G. tigrata

Binomial name
- Givira tigrata Schaus, 1911

Synonyms
- Acyttara tigrata

Species of moth

Givira tigrata is a moth in the family Cossidae. It is found in Costa Rica.
