= Givira nudaria =

Scientific classification
- Kingdom: Animalia
- Phylum: Arthropoda
- Clade: Pancrustacea
- Class: Insecta
- Order: Lepidoptera
- Family: Cossidae
- Genus: Givira
- Species: G. nudaria

Binomial name
- Givira nudaria (Schaus, 1901)

Synonyms
- Eugivira nudaria Schaus, 1901; Lentagena nudaria; Zeuzera dolens Druce, 1901 [manuscript name]

Species of moth

Givira nudaria is a moth in the family Cossidae described by William Schaus in 1901. It is found in Brazil, Venezuela, Guyana, Peru and Colombia.

The wingspan is about 35 mm. The forewings are light grey, irrorated (sprinkled) with white specks and striated with darker grey. The costal margin is spotted with black. The hindwings are whitish, striated with grey on the outer half.
