= Givira guata =

Scientific classification
- Kingdom: Animalia
- Phylum: Arthropoda
- Clade: Pancrustacea
- Class: Insecta
- Order: Lepidoptera
- Family: Cossidae
- Genus: Givira
- Species: G. guata

Binomial name
- Givira guata Schaus, 1921

Species of moth

Givira guata is a moth in the family Cossidae. It is found in Guatemala.

The wingspan is about 36 mm. The forewings are pale lilac brown, slightly paler before an oblique brown shade from the middle of the costal margin to the tornus. There are irregular transverse streaks between the veins. The hindwings are pale brownish grey with some slightly darker lines. The inner margin is shaded with greyish brown.
