= Givira watsoni =

Scientific classification
- Kingdom: Animalia
- Phylum: Arthropoda
- Clade: Pancrustacea
- Class: Insecta
- Order: Lepidoptera
- Family: Cossidae
- Genus: Givira
- Species: G. watsoni

Binomial name
- Givira watsoni Schaus, 1901

Species of moth

Givira watsoni is a moth in the family Cossidae. It was described by William Schaus in 1901 and is found in Brazil.

The wingspan is about 25 mm. The forewings are brown at the base, followed by a broad darker brown band, enclosing a small white spot. The median area is whitish, irrorated (sprinkled) with brown and crossed by a fine dark broken line. The hindwings are brown with traces of darker spots near the apex.
