= Langsdorfia metana =

Scientific classification
- Kingdom: Animalia
- Phylum: Arthropoda
- Class: Insecta
- Order: Lepidoptera
- Family: Cossidae
- Genus: Langsdorfia
- Species: L. metana

Binomial name
- Langsdorfia metana (Dognin, 1910)

Synonyms
- Philanglaus metana Dognin, 1910

Species of moth

Langsdorfia metana is a moth in the family Cossidae. It is found in Argentina.
