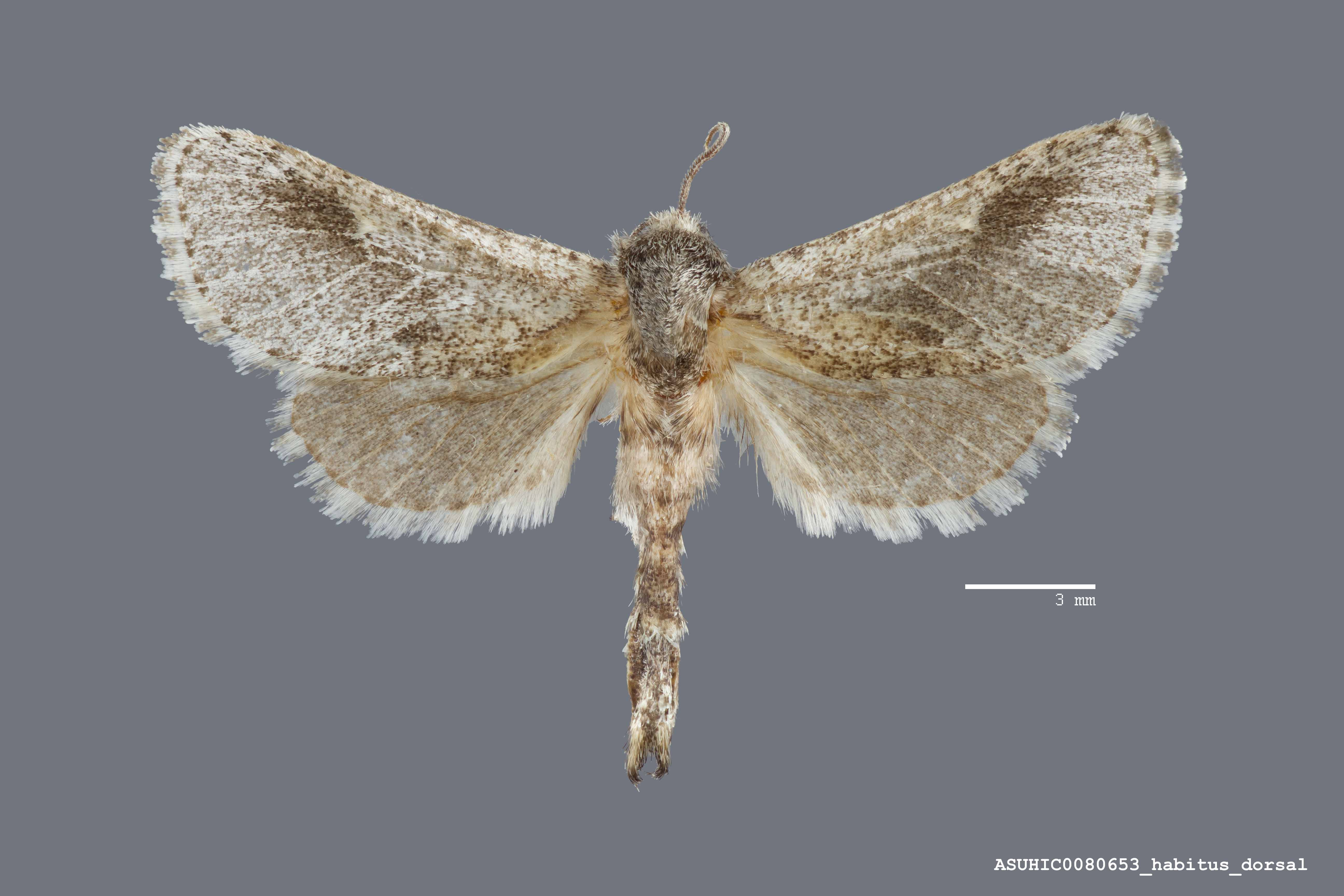

Scientific classification
- Kingdom: Animalia
- Phylum: Arthropoda
- Clade: Pancrustacea
- Class: Insecta
- Order: Lepidoptera
- Family: Cossidae
- Genus: Givira
- Species: G. lucretia

Binomial name
- Givira lucretia Barnes & McDunnough, 1913

= Givira lucretia =

Species of moth

Givira lucretia is a moth in the family Cossidae first described by William Barnes and James Halliday McDunnough in 1913. It is found in North America, where it has been recorded from Arizona, Texas and Wyoming.

The wingspan 23–28 mm. Adults have been recorded on wing from April to August.
