= Givira basiplaga =

Scientific classification
- Kingdom: Animalia
- Phylum: Arthropoda
- Clade: Pancrustacea
- Class: Insecta
- Order: Lepidoptera
- Family: Cossidae
- Genus: Givira
- Species: G. basiplaga

Binomial name
- Givira basiplaga (Schaus, 1905)

Synonyms
- Ravigia basiplaga Schaus, 1905

Species of moth

Givira basiplaga is a moth in the family Cossidae. It is found in Guyana.
