= Givira rubida =

Scientific classification
- Kingdom: Animalia
- Phylum: Arthropoda
- Clade: Pancrustacea
- Class: Insecta
- Order: Lepidoptera
- Family: Cossidae
- Genus: Givira
- Species: G. rubida

Binomial name
- Givira rubida Dognin, 1910

Species of moth

Givira rubida is a moth in the family Cossidae. It is found in French Guiana.
