= Givira chiclin =

Scientific classification
- Kingdom: Animalia
- Phylum: Arthropoda
- Clade: Pancrustacea
- Class: Insecta
- Order: Lepidoptera
- Family: Cossidae
- Genus: Givira
- Species: G. chiclin

Binomial name
- Givira chiclin Dognin, 1905

Species of moth

Givira chiclin is a moth in the family Cossidae. It is found in Peru.
