= Hypopta rubiginosa =

Scientific classification
- Domain: Eukaryota
- Kingdom: Animalia
- Phylum: Arthropoda
- Class: Insecta
- Order: Lepidoptera
- Family: Cossidae
- Genus: Hypopta
- Species: H. rubiginosa

Binomial name
- Hypopta rubiginosa (Herrich-Schäffer, 1853)

Synonyms
- Cossus rubiginosa Herrich-Schäffer, 1853

Species of moth

Hypopta rubiginosa is a moth in the family Cossidae. It is found in Brazil.
