= Langsdorfia penai =

Scientific classification
- Kingdom: Animalia
- Phylum: Arthropoda
- Clade: Pancrustacea
- Class: Insecta
- Order: Lepidoptera
- Family: Cossidae
- Genus: Langsdorfia
- Species: L. penai

Binomial name
- Langsdorfia penai (Clench, 1957)

Synonyms
- Philanglaus penai Clench, 1957

Species of moth

Langsdorfia penai is a moth in the family Cossidae. It is found in Chile.

== Etymology ==
The species is named for Sr. Luis Pena, who collected of the species.
