= Inguromorpha buboa =

Scientific classification
- Kingdom: Animalia
- Phylum: Arthropoda
- Class: Insecta
- Order: Lepidoptera
- Family: Cossidae
- Genus: Inguromorpha
- Species: I. buboa

Binomial name
- Inguromorpha buboa Schaus, 1934

Species of moth

Inguromorpha buboa is a moth in the family Cossidae. It is found in Brazil.
