= Langsdorfia beatrix =

Scientific classification
- Kingdom: Animalia
- Phylum: Arthropoda
- Clade: Pancrustacea
- Class: Insecta
- Order: Lepidoptera
- Family: Cossidae
- Genus: Langsdorfia
- Species: L. beatrix

Binomial name
- Langsdorfia beatrix (Schaus, 1921)

Synonyms
- Philanglaus beatrix Schaus, 1921

Species of moth

Langsdorfia beatrix is a moth in the family Cossidae. It is found in Guatemala.
