= Hypopta centrosoma =

Scientific classification
- Kingdom: Animalia
- Phylum: Arthropoda
- Class: Insecta
- Order: Lepidoptera
- Family: Cossidae
- Genus: Hypopta
- Species: H. centrosoma

Binomial name
- Hypopta centrosoma Dyar, 1925

Species of moth

Hypopta centrosoma is a moth in the family Cossidae. It is found in Mexico.
