= Hypopta cinerea =

Scientific classification
- Domain: Eukaryota
- Kingdom: Animalia
- Phylum: Arthropoda
- Class: Insecta
- Order: Lepidoptera
- Family: Cossidae
- Genus: Hypopta
- Species: H. cinerea

Binomial name
- Hypopta cinerea Schaus, 1911

Species of moth

Hypopta cinerea is a moth in the family Cossidae. It is found in Costa Rica.
