= Langsdorfia franckii =

Scientific classification
- Kingdom: Animalia
- Phylum: Arthropoda
- Clade: Pancrustacea
- Class: Insecta
- Order: Lepidoptera
- Family: Cossidae
- Genus: Langsdorfia
- Species: L. franckii

Binomial name
- Langsdorfia franckii Hübner, 1824

Synonyms
- Langsdorfia frankii; Langsdorfia franki; Langsdorfia langsdorfii Dyar & Schaus, 1937

Species of moth

Langsdorfia franckii is a moth of the family Cossidae. It is native to Mexico, Nicaragua, Costa Rica, Panama, Colombia, Venezuela, Trinidad, Suriname, Ecuador, Peru, Bolivia and Brazil. It was researched for introduction in Hawaii to control Lantana, but no releases have been made.

The larvae feed on the stems and roots of Lantana species, including Lantana scorta. The larvae are about 50 mm long and red. They have a strong persistent odor when injured.
