= Inguromorpha polybioides =

Scientific classification
- Kingdom: Animalia
- Phylum: Arthropoda
- Class: Insecta
- Order: Lepidoptera
- Family: Cossidae
- Genus: Inguromorpha
- Species: I. polybioides

Binomial name
- Inguromorpha polybioides (Schaus, 1911)

Synonyms
- Givira polybioides Schaus, 1911; Ravigia polybioides

Species of moth

Inguromorpha polybioides is a moth of the family Cossidae. It is found in Brazil (Parana).
