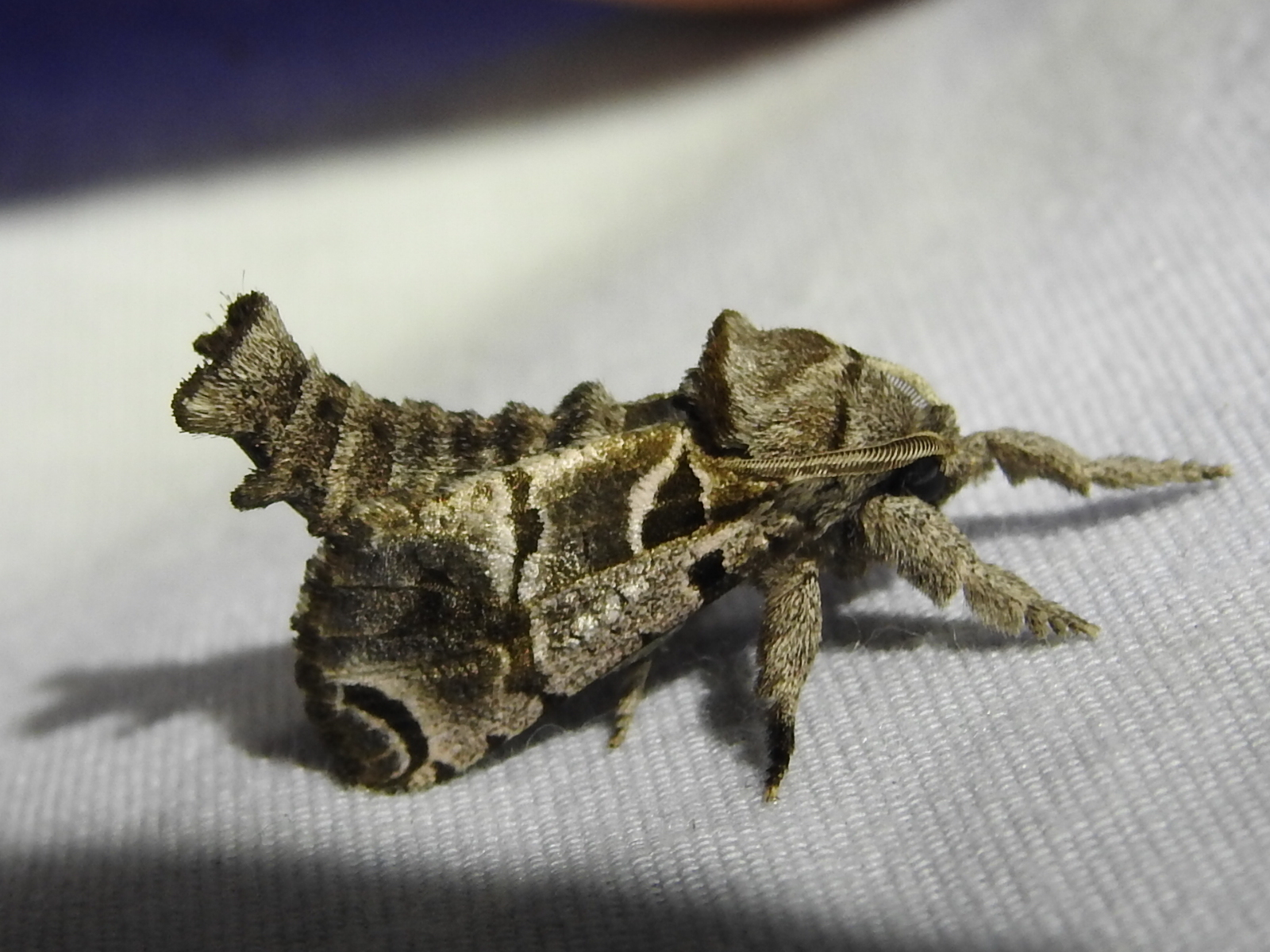

Scientific classification
- Kingdom: Animalia
- Phylum: Arthropoda
- Clade: Pancrustacea
- Class: Insecta
- Order: Lepidoptera
- Family: Cossidae
- Genus: Inguromorpha
- Species: I. arcifera

Binomial name
- Inguromorpha arcifera (Dyar, 1906)

Synonyms
- Hypopta arcifera Dyar, 1906; Pomeria arcifera

= Inguromorpha arcifera =

Species of moth

Inguromorpha arcifera is a species of moth in the family Cossidae. It is found in North America, where it has been recorded from Texas.

The wingspan is 28 mm for males and 38 mm for females. Adults have been recorded from April to May.
