= Givira durangona =

Scientific classification
- Kingdom: Animalia
- Phylum: Arthropoda
- Clade: Pancrustacea
- Class: Insecta
- Order: Lepidoptera
- Family: Cossidae
- Genus: Givira
- Species: G. durangona

Binomial name
- Givira durangona (Schaus, 1901)

Synonyms
- Eugivira durangona Schaus, 1901

Species of moth

Givira durangona is a moth in the family Cossidae described by William Schaus in 1901. It is found in Mexico (Durango) and the United States, where it has been recorded from Colorado.

The wingspan is about 26 mm. The forewings are white with some dark points along the costa and a cluster of reddish-brown and black scales on the middle of the inner margin. The hindwings are white, covered with small indistinct grayish spots.
