= Langsdorfia rufescens =

Scientific classification
- Kingdom: Animalia
- Phylum: Arthropoda
- Class: Insecta
- Order: Lepidoptera
- Family: Cossidae
- Genus: Langsdorfia
- Species: L. rufescens

Binomial name
- Langsdorfia rufescens H. Druce, 1901

Species of moth

Langsdorfia rufescens is a moth in the family Cossidae first described by Herbert Druce in 1901. It is found in Colombia.
