= Givira gnoma =

Scientific classification
- Kingdom: Animalia
- Phylum: Arthropoda
- Clade: Pancrustacea
- Class: Insecta
- Order: Lepidoptera
- Family: Cossidae
- Genus: Givira
- Species: G. gnoma

Binomial name
- Givira gnoma Schaus, 1921

Species of moth

Givira gnoma is a moth in the family Cossidae. It is found in Brazil (Santa Catarina).

The wingspan is about 34 mm. The basal half of the inner margin on the forewings is dark chocolate brown, its outer edge oblique edged with white. The space above it and beyond it is roseate grey. The hindwings are pale grey with some darker striae, and a dark shade medially below the costa.
