= Givira tristani =

Scientific classification
- Kingdom: Animalia
- Phylum: Arthropoda
- Clade: Pancrustacea
- Class: Insecta
- Order: Lepidoptera
- Family: Cossidae
- Genus: Givira
- Species: G. tristani

Binomial name
- Givira tristani (Schaus, 1911)

Synonyms
- Lentagena tristani Schaus, 1911

Species of moth

Givira tristani is a moth in the family Cossidae. It is found in Colombia, Guatemala, Honduras and Mexico.

The wingspan is about 39 mm. The forewings are whitish, shaded with grey postmedially and reticulated with fine darker grey lines. The costal margin, base of the cell, inner margin and apex are shaded with brown. There is a fine brown streak on the discocellular and a broad dark brown streak medially above the submedian. The hindwings are semihyaline whitish grey, while the margins, veins and some striae are brown.

== Etymology ==
The species is named after Prof. Tristan.
