= Givira talboti =

Scientific classification
- Kingdom: Animalia
- Phylum: Arthropoda
- Clade: Pancrustacea
- Class: Insecta
- Order: Lepidoptera
- Family: Cossidae
- Genus: Givira
- Species: G. talboti

Binomial name
- Givira talboti Dognin, 1922

Species of moth

Givira talboti is a moth in the family Cossidae. It is found in Bolivia and Peru.
