= Givira philomela =

Scientific classification
- Kingdom: Animalia
- Phylum: Arthropoda
- Clade: Pancrustacea
- Class: Insecta
- Order: Lepidoptera
- Family: Cossidae
- Genus: Givira
- Species: G. philomela

Binomial name
- Givira philomela Schaus, 1892

Synonyms
- Eugivira philomela

Species of moth

Givira philomela is a moth in the family Cossidae. It is found in Brazil.
