= Givira circumpunctata =

Scientific classification
- Kingdom: Animalia
- Phylum: Arthropoda
- Clade: Pancrustacea
- Class: Insecta
- Order: Lepidoptera
- Family: Cossidae
- Genus: Givira
- Species: G. circumpunctata

Binomial name
- Givira circumpunctata (Dognin, 1916)

Synonyms
- Lentagena circumpunctata Dognin, 1916

Species of moth

Givira circumpunctata is a moth in the family Cossidae. It is found in Guyana.
