= Langsdorfia minima =

Scientific classification
- Kingdom: Animalia
- Phylum: Arthropoda
- Class: Insecta
- Order: Lepidoptera
- Family: Cossidae
- Genus: Langsdorfia
- Species: L. minima

Binomial name
- Langsdorfia minima Dognin, 1891

Species of moth

Langsdorfia minima is a moth in the family Cossidae. It is found in Ecuador (Loja Province).
