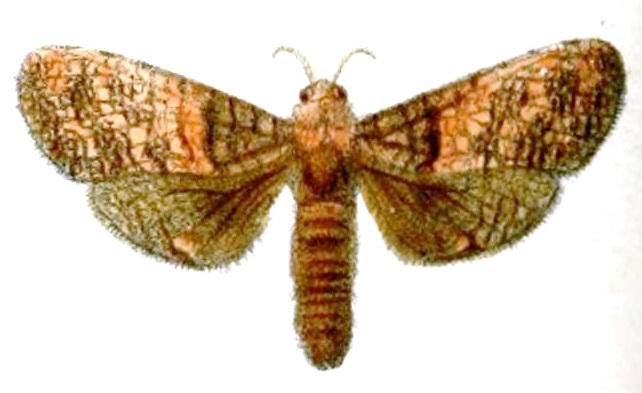

Scientific classification
- Kingdom: Animalia
- Phylum: Arthropoda
- Class: Insecta
- Order: Lepidoptera
- Family: Cossidae
- Genus: Hypopta
- Species: H. amundasa

Binomial name
- Hypopta amundasa (H. Druce, 1890)

Synonyms
- Cossus amundasa H. Druce, 1890

= Hypopta amundasa =

Species of moth

Hypopta amundasa is a moth in the family Cossidae first described by Herbert Druce in 1890. It is found in Ecuador.

The forewings are reddish pink with a dark brown base and outer margin. The wing is thickly streaked with minute black lines. The hindwings are dark brown, with a red spot close to the anal angle.
