= Givira undulosa =

Scientific classification
- Kingdom: Animalia
- Phylum: Arthropoda
- Clade: Pancrustacea
- Class: Insecta
- Order: Lepidoptera
- Family: Cossidae
- Genus: Givira
- Species: G. undulosa

Binomial name
- Givira undulosa (H. Druce, 1911)

Synonyms
- Zeuzera undulosa H. Druce, 1911

Species of moth

Givira undulosa is a moth in the family Cossidae first described by Herbert Druce in 1911. It is found in Colombia.
