= Inguromorpha basalis =

Scientific classification
- Kingdom: Animalia
- Phylum: Arthropoda
- Class: Insecta
- Order: Lepidoptera
- Family: Cossidae
- Genus: Inguromorpha
- Species: I. basalis

Binomial name
- Inguromorpha basalis Walker, 1856

Synonyms
- Inguromorpha slossonae H. Edwards, 1889

Species of moth

Inguromorpha basalis, the black-lined carpenterworm moth, is a moth in the family Cossidae. It is found in North America, where it has been recorded from the south-eastern United States, from New Jersey south to Florida and west to Missouri and Arkansas.

The wingspan is 26–38 mm. Adults have been recorded from May to August.
