= Givira sabulosa =

Scientific classification
- Kingdom: Animalia
- Phylum: Arthropoda
- Clade: Pancrustacea
- Class: Insecta
- Order: Lepidoptera
- Family: Cossidae
- Genus: Givira
- Species: G. sabulosa

Binomial name
- Givira sabulosa (Schaus, 1901)

Synonyms
- Eugivira sabulosa Schaus, 1901; Sinicossus sabulosa

Species of moth

Givira sabulosa is a moth in the family Cossidae. It was described by William Schaus in 1901 and is found in São Paulo, Brazil.

The wingspan is about 37 mm. The forewings are light brown, irrorated (sprinkled) with darker brown. There are blackish lines, forming indistinct shades and striae, as well as blackish spots on the costa and an interrupted blackish inner line, a dark spot at the end of the cell and an outer irregular dark line, connected with the submarginal irregular shadings. The hindwings are brown with irregular darker transverse striae on the outer half.
