= Givira obidosa =

Scientific classification
- Kingdom: Animalia
- Phylum: Arthropoda
- Clade: Pancrustacea
- Class: Insecta
- Order: Lepidoptera
- Family: Cossidae
- Genus: Givira
- Species: G. obidosa

Binomial name
- Givira obidosa Dognin, 1923

Species of moth

Givira obidosa is a moth in the family Cossidae. It is found in Brazil (Pará).
