= Hypopta albipuncta =

Scientific classification
- Kingdom: Animalia
- Phylum: Arthropoda
- Clade: Pancrustacea
- Class: Insecta
- Order: Lepidoptera
- Family: Cossidae
- Genus: Hypopta
- Species: H. albipuncta

Binomial name
- Hypopta albipuncta Schaus, 1921

Species of moth

Hypopta albipuncta is a moth in the family Cossidae. It is found in Guatemala.

The wingspan is about 25 mm. The forewings are pale brown, shading to whitish grey on the terminal third and with faint traces of darker striae. The inner margin is fringed with white and there is a white spot at the end of the cell, as well as paired dark points at the tips of the veins. The hindwings are whitish grey, but darker on the margins.
