= Givarbela =

Scientific classification
- Kingdom: Animalia
- Phylum: Arthropoda
- Clade: Pancrustacea
- Class: Insecta
- Order: Lepidoptera
- Family: Cossidae
- Subfamily: Hypoptinae
- Genus: Givarbela; Clench, 1957
- Species: G. steinbachi

Binomial name
- Givarbela steinbachi Clench, 1957

Species of moth

Givarbela steinbachi is a moth in the family Cossidae, and the only species in the genus Givarbela. It is found in Bolivia.
