= Givira carisca =

Scientific classification
- Kingdom: Animalia
- Phylum: Arthropoda
- Clade: Pancrustacea
- Class: Insecta
- Order: Lepidoptera
- Family: Cossidae
- Genus: Givira
- Species: G. carisca

Binomial name
- Givira carisca (Schaus, 1901)

Synonyms
- Eugivira carisca Schaus, 1901

Species of moth

Givira carisca is a moth in the family Cossidae. It is found in Mexico.

The wingspan is about 23 mm. The forewings are whitish with a cluster of large dark brown spots at the base, separated by veins. The hindwings are greyish white.
