= Hypopta albicosta =

Scientific classification
- Domain: Eukaryota
- Kingdom: Animalia
- Phylum: Arthropoda
- Class: Insecta
- Order: Lepidoptera
- Family: Cossidae
- Genus: Hypopta
- Species: H. albicosta

Binomial name
- Hypopta albicosta Hering, 1923

Species of moth

Hypopta albicosta is a moth in the family Cossidae. It is found in Argentina.
