= Psychogena duplex =

Scientific classification
- Kingdom: Animalia
- Phylum: Arthropoda
- Class: Insecta
- Order: Lepidoptera
- Family: Cossidae
- Genus: Psychogena
- Species: P. duplex

Binomial name
- Psychogena duplex (Schaus, 1905)

Synonyms
- Prionoxystus duplex Schaus, 1905

Species of moth

Psychogena duplex is a moth in the family Cossidae. It is found in French Guiana.
