= Givira cleopatra =

Scientific classification
- Kingdom: Animalia
- Phylum: Arthropoda
- Clade: Pancrustacea
- Class: Insecta
- Order: Lepidoptera
- Family: Cossidae
- Genus: Givira
- Species: G. cleopatra

Binomial name
- Givira cleopatra Barnes & McDunnough, 1912

Species of moth

Givira cleopatra is a moth in the family Cossidae first described by William Barnes and James Halliday McDunnough in 1912. It is found in North America, where it has been recorded from Arizona, California, Nevada and Utah.
