= Givira felicoma =

Scientific classification
- Kingdom: Animalia
- Phylum: Arthropoda
- Clade: Pancrustacea
- Class: Insecta
- Order: Lepidoptera
- Family: Cossidae
- Genus: Givira
- Species: G. felicoma

Binomial name
- Givira felicoma Dyar, 1913

Species of moth

Givira felicoma is a moth in the family Cossidae. It is found in Mexico.
