= Givira tristis =

Scientific classification
- Kingdom: Animalia
- Phylum: Arthropoda
- Clade: Pancrustacea
- Class: Insecta
- Order: Lepidoptera
- Family: Cossidae
- Genus: Givira
- Species: G. tristis

Binomial name
- Givira tristis Walker, 1856

Species of moth

Givira tristis is a moth in the family Cossidae first described by Francis Walker in 1856. The type location is given as "Patria ?", but it is not clear where this is.
