= Givira pulverosa =

Scientific classification
- Kingdom: Animalia
- Phylum: Arthropoda
- Clade: Pancrustacea
- Class: Insecta
- Order: Lepidoptera
- Family: Cossidae
- Genus: Givira
- Species: G. pulverosa

Binomial name
- Givira pulverosa Hampson, 1898

Synonyms
- Eugivira pulverosa

Species of moth

Givira pulverosa is a moth in the family Cossidae described by George Hampson in 1898. It is found in St. Lucia, St. Vincent and Grenada.

The wingspan is about 40 mm. Adults are brownish grey, the forewings with small rufous spots on the costal area, consisting of an antemedial series in the cell. There are also brown striae on the inner and terminal areas, as well as an obscure subterminal and terminal series of small spots. The hindwings are fuscous brown with a terminal series of spots.
