= Givira =

Scientific classification
- Domain: Eukaryota
- Kingdom: Animalia
- Phylum: Arthropoda
- Class: Insecta
- Order: Lepidoptera
- Family: Cossidae
- Subfamily: Hypoptinae
- Genus: Givira; Walker, 1856

Synonyms
- Eugivira Schaus, 1901; Stenocyttara Turner, 1918; Lentagena Dyar, 1905; Acyttara Turner, 1918

Moth genus in family Cossidae

Givira is a genus of moths in the family Cossidae.

== Species ==
- Givira albosignata Ureta, 1957
- Givira amanosa Schaus, 1911
- Givira anna (Dyar, 1898)
- Givira arbeloides (Dyar, 1899)
- Givira aregentipuncta Schaus, 1934
- Givira argenteolaminata Dognin, 1916
- Givira aroa (Schaus, 1894)
- Givira australis Ureta, 1957
- Givira basiplaga (Schaus, 1905)
- Givira binubila Dognin, 1916
- Givira brunnea Köhler, 1924
- Givira brunneoguttata Gentili
- Givira carisca (Schaus, 1901)
- Givira carla Dyar, 1923
- Givira chiclin Dognin, 1905
- Givira circumpunctata (Dognin, 1916)
- Givira clathrata (Dognin, 1910)
- Givira cleopatra Barnes & McDunnough, 1912
- Givira cornelia (Neumoegen & Dyar, 1893)
- Givira egipan Dognin, 1923
- Givira daphne (Druce, 1901)
- Givira difflua Dognin, 1920
- Givira durangona (Schaus, 1901)
- Givira ethela (Neumoegen & Dyar, 1893)
- Givira eureca (Schaus, 1921)
- Givira felicoma Dyar, 1913
- Givira fidelis Schaus, 1911
- Givira francesca (Dyar, 1909)
- Givira gabriel Dyar, 1913
- Givira hypomelaleuca Zukowsky, 1954
- Givira gnoma Schaus, 1921
- Givira guata Schaus, 1921
- Givira isarba Schaus, 1934
- Givira isolde Schaus, 1934
- Givira leonera Clench, 1957
- Givira lotta Barnes & McDunnough, 1910
- Givira lucretia Barnes & McDunnough, 1913
- Givira marga Barnes & McDunnough, 1910
- Givira minuta Barnes & McDunnough, 1910
- Givira moche Dognin, 1905
- Givira modisma Schaus, 1921
- Givira morosa Schaus, 1911
- Givira mucida (Edwards, 1882)
- Givira nudaria (Schaus, 1901)
- Givira obidosa Dognin, 1923
- Givira onscura Köhler, 1924
- Givira ornata (Dognin, 1911)
- Givira pardana (Schaus, 1901)
- Givira perfida (Schaus, 1921)
- Givira philomela (Schaus, 1892)
- Givira plagiata (Schaus, 1901)
- Givira platea Schaus, 1901
- Givira pulverosa (Hampson, 1898)
- Givira quadra (Schaus, 1901)
- Givira quadroides (Hering, 1923)
- Givira roxana (Druce, 1911)
- Givira rubida Dognin, 1910
- Givira rufiflava (Dognin, 1917)
- Givira sabulosa (Schaus, 1901)
- Givira saladota (Dognin, 1911)
- Givira salome (Dyar, 1910)
- Givira sandelphon Dyar, 1912
- Givira sobrana (Schaus, 1905)
- Givira stypus Forbes, 1942
- Givira superquadra Dognin, 1916
- Givira talboti Dognin, 1922
- Givira tecmessa (Schaus, 1892)
- Givira theodori (Dyar, 1893)
- Givira tigrata Schaus, 1911
- Givira triplex Schaus, 1905
- Givira tristani (Schaus, 1911)
- Givira tristis Walker, 1856
- Givira tucumanata Dognin, 1910
- Givira variabilis Köhler, 1924
- Givira undulosa (Druce, 1911)
- Givira vicunensis Ureta, 1957
- Givira viletta Schaus, 1934
- Givira v-nigra Köhler, 1924
- Givira watsoni Schaus, 1901

== Former species ==
- Givira kunzei Dyar, 1923
