= Langsdorfia sieglinda =

Scientific classification
- Kingdom: Animalia
- Phylum: Arthropoda
- Class: Insecta
- Order: Lepidoptera
- Family: Cossidae
- Genus: Langsdorfia
- Species: L. sieglinda

Binomial name
- Langsdorfia sieglinda Schaus, 1934

Species of moth

Langsdorfia sieglinda is a moth in the family Cossidae. It is found in Brazil.
