= Givira pardana =

Scientific classification
- Kingdom: Animalia
- Phylum: Arthropoda
- Clade: Pancrustacea
- Class: Insecta
- Order: Lepidoptera
- Family: Cossidae
- Genus: Givira
- Species: G. pardana

Binomial name
- Givira pardana (Schaus, 1901)

Synonyms
- Eugivira pardana Schaus, 1901

Species of moth

Givira pardana is a moth in the family Cossidae. It is found in São Paulo, Brazil.

The wingspan is about 30 mm. The forewings are light brown with a basal, inner, outer and subterminal row of round, dark brown spots, edged with whitish. There are traces of darker, transverse, irregular and broken lines on the hindwings.
