= Langsdorfia coresa =

Scientific classification
- Kingdom: Animalia
- Phylum: Arthropoda
- Class: Insecta
- Order: Lepidoptera
- Family: Cossidae
- Genus: Langsdorfia
- Species: L. coresa

Binomial name
- Langsdorfia coresa Schaus, 1901

Species of moth

Langsdorfia coresa is a moth in the family Cossidae. It was described by William Schaus in 1901 and is found in Colombia.

The wingspan is about 27 mm. The forewings are greyish brown, with dark brown markings and small spots on the costa, in the cell and below it. The hindwings are dark brown, with darker streaks and reticulations.
