= Langsdorfia dukinfieldi =

Scientific classification
- Kingdom: Animalia
- Phylum: Arthropoda
- Class: Insecta
- Order: Lepidoptera
- Family: Cossidae
- Genus: Langsdorfia
- Species: L. dukinfieldi

Binomial name
- Langsdorfia dukinfieldi Schaus, 1894

Species of moth

Langsdorfia dukinfieldi is a moth in the family Cossidae. It is found in Brazil (Para).
