= Hypopta invida =

Scientific classification
- Kingdom: Animalia
- Phylum: Arthropoda
- Class: Insecta
- Order: Lepidoptera
- Family: Cossidae
- Genus: Hypopta
- Species: H. invida

Binomial name
- Hypopta invida Dognin, 1916

Species of moth

Hypopta invida is a moth in the family Cossidae. It is found in Venezuela.
