= Hypopta actileuca =

Scientific classification
- Kingdom: Animalia
- Phylum: Arthropoda
- Class: Insecta
- Order: Lepidoptera
- Family: Cossidae
- Genus: Hypopta
- Species: H. actileuca

Binomial name
- Hypopta actileuca Dyar, 1918

Species of moth

Hypopta actileuca is a moth in the family Cossidae. It is found in Mexico.
