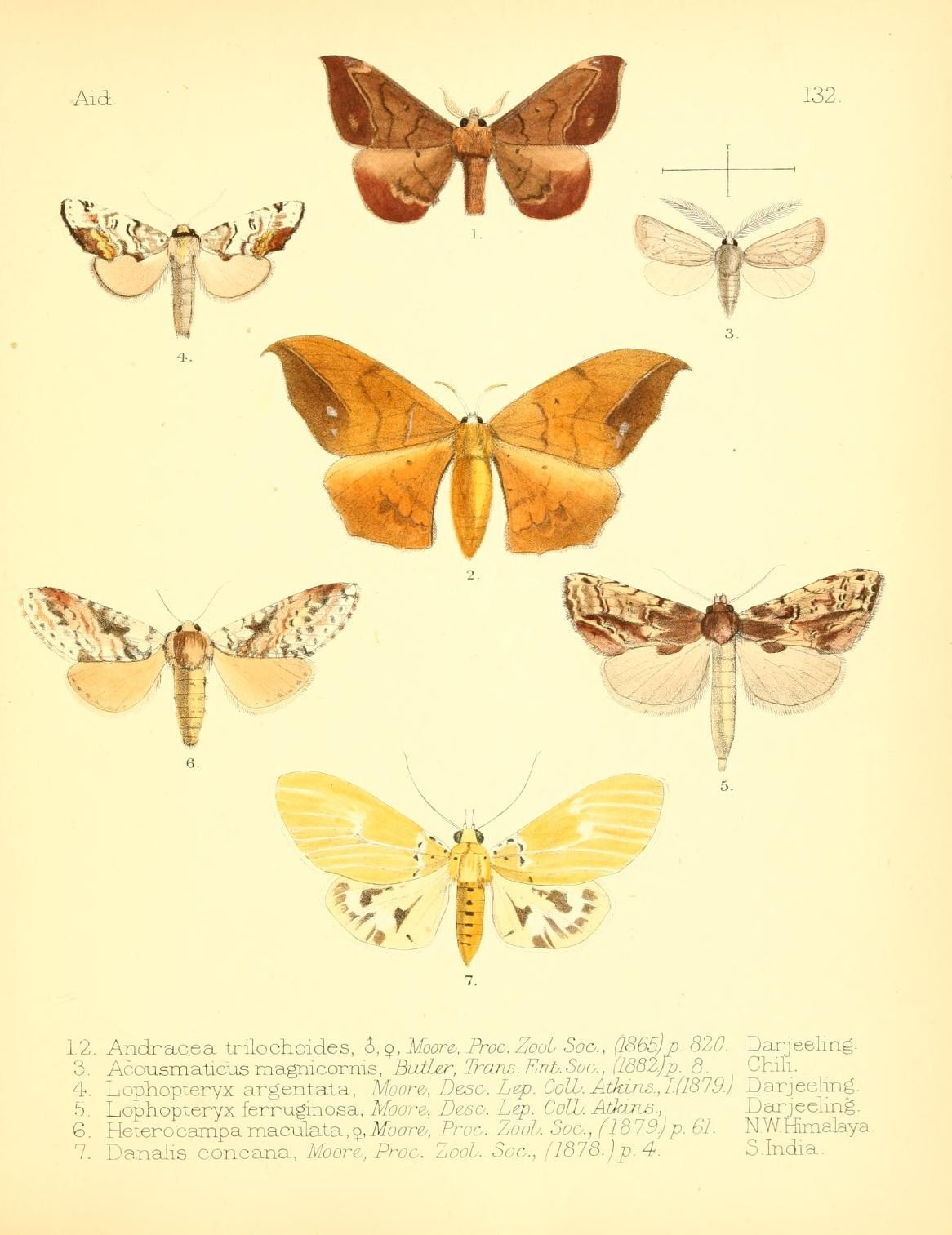

Scientific classification
- Kingdom: Animalia
- Phylum: Arthropoda
- Clade: Pancrustacea
- Class: Insecta
- Order: Lepidoptera
- Family: Cossidae
- Subfamily: Hypoptinae
- Genus: Acousmaticus; Butler, 1882
- Species: A. magnicornis

Binomial name
- Acousmaticus magnicornis Butler, 1882

= Acousmaticus =

Species of moth

Acousmaticus magnicornis is a moth in the family Cossidae, and it is the only species in the genus Acousmaticus. It is found in Chile.
