= Givira tecmessa =

Scientific classification
- Kingdom: Animalia
- Phylum: Arthropoda
- Clade: Pancrustacea
- Class: Insecta
- Order: Lepidoptera
- Family: Cossidae
- Genus: Givira
- Species: G. tecmessa

Binomial name
- Givira tecmessa (Schaus, 1892)

Synonyms
- Eugivira tecmessa

Species of moth

Givira tecmessa is a moth in the family Cossidae. It is found in Brazil.
