= Langsdorfia tessellata =

Scientific classification
- Kingdom: Animalia
- Phylum: Arthropoda
- Class: Insecta
- Order: Lepidoptera
- Family: Cossidae
- Genus: Langsdorfia
- Species: L. tessellata

Binomial name
- Langsdorfia tessellata E. D. Jones, 1912

Species of moth

Langsdorfia tessellata is a moth in the family Cossidae first described by E. Dukinfield Jones in 1912. It is found in Brazil.
