= Hypopta corrientina =

Scientific classification
- Domain: Eukaryota
- Kingdom: Animalia
- Phylum: Arthropoda
- Class: Insecta
- Order: Lepidoptera
- Family: Cossidae
- Genus: Hypopta
- Species: H. corrientina

Binomial name
- Hypopta corrientina Berg, 1882

Species of moth

Hypopta corrientina is a moth in the family Cossidae. It is found in Argentina.
