= Givira ornata =

Scientific classification
- Kingdom: Animalia
- Phylum: Arthropoda
- Clade: Pancrustacea
- Class: Insecta
- Order: Lepidoptera
- Family: Cossidae
- Genus: Givira
- Species: G. ornata

Binomial name
- Givira ornata (Dognin, 1911)

Synonyms
- Eugivira ornata Dognin, 1911

Species of moth

Givira ornata is a moth in the family Cossidae. It is found in Argentina.
