= Langsdorfia leucrocraspedontis =

Scientific classification
- Kingdom: Animalia
- Phylum: Arthropoda
- Class: Insecta
- Order: Lepidoptera
- Family: Cossidae
- Genus: Langsdorfia
- Species: L. leucrocraspedontis

Binomial name
- Langsdorfia leucrocraspedontis (Zukowsky, 1954)

Synonyms
- Miacora leucrocraspedontis Zukowsky, 1954

Species of moth

Langsdorfia leucrocraspedontis is a moth in the family Cossidae. It is found in Peru.
