= Givira plagiata =

Scientific classification
- Kingdom: Animalia
- Phylum: Arthropoda
- Clade: Pancrustacea
- Class: Insecta
- Order: Lepidoptera
- Family: Cossidae
- Genus: Givira
- Species: G. plagiata

Binomial name
- Givira plagiata (Schaus, 1901)

Synonyms
- Eugivira plagiata Schaus, 1901

Species of moth

Givira plagiata is a moth in the family Cossidae. It was described by William Schaus in 1901 and is found in Venezuela.

The wingspan is about 38 mm. The forewings are grey, shaded with light brown at the base and on the inner margin. The outer portion is mottled with white and brownish-grey striae and several brown spots. The hindwings are dark greyish brown, but paler terminally with dark spots at the veins, and a dark subterminal shade below the costa.
