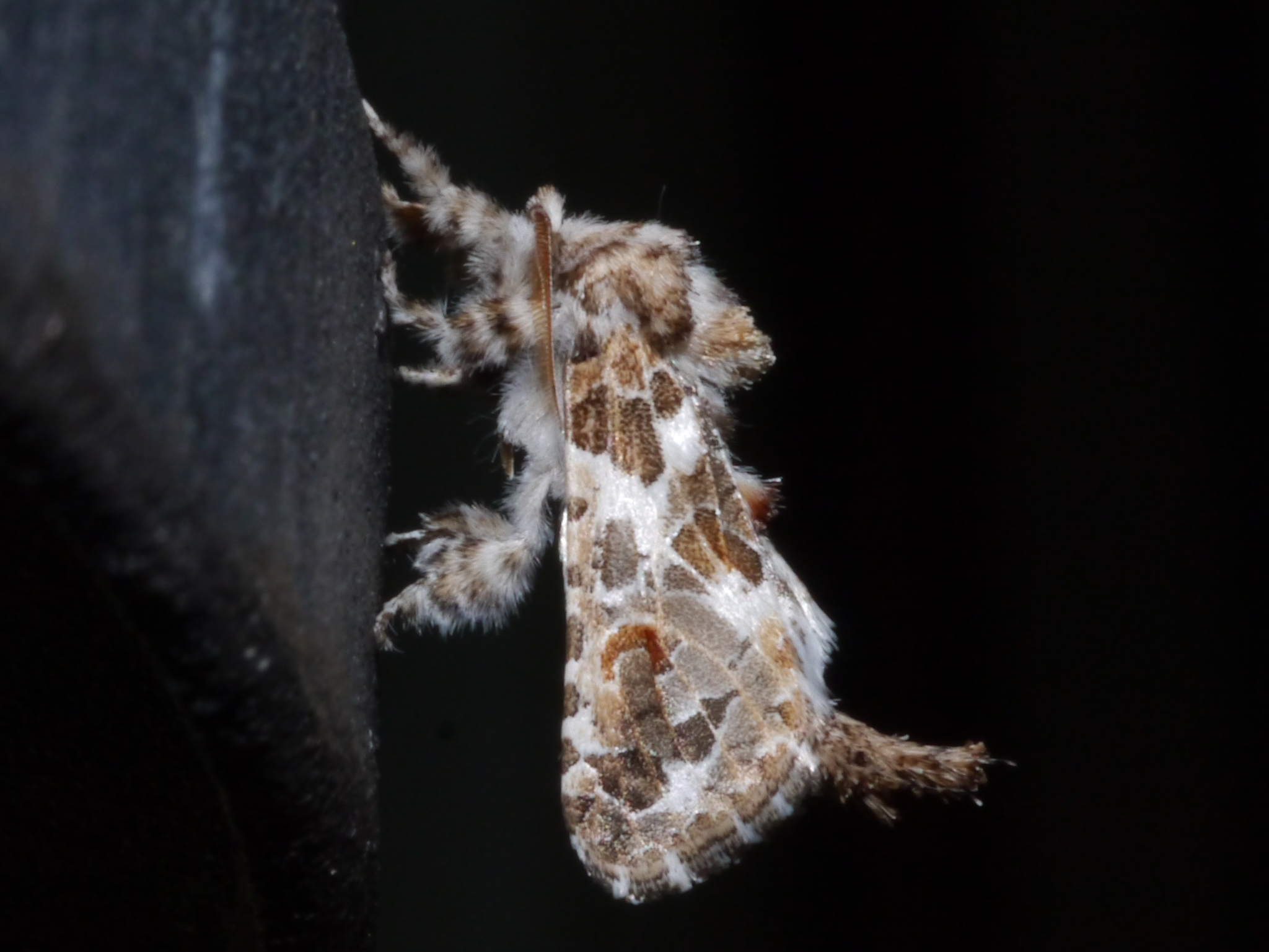

Scientific classification
- Kingdom: Animalia
- Phylum: Arthropoda
- Clade: Pancrustacea
- Class: Insecta
- Order: Lepidoptera
- Family: Cossidae
- Genus: Givira
- Species: G. minuta

Binomial name
- Givira minuta Barnes & McDunnough, 1910

= Givira minuta =

Species of moth

Givira minuta is a moth in the family Cossidae first described by William Barnes and James Halliday McDunnough in 1910. It is found in North America, where it has been recorded from southern Arizona.

The wingspan is about 17 mm. The forewings are light ocherous brown, shaded with fuscous beyond the cell and with a broad creamy costal margin. The hindwings are dark smoky brown, but lighter on the costa. Adults have been recorded on wing from April to June.
