= Langsdorfia albescens =

Scientific classification
- Kingdom: Animalia
- Phylum: Arthropoda
- Class: Insecta
- Order: Lepidoptera
- Family: Cossidae
- Genus: Langsdorfia
- Species: L. albescens

Binomial name
- Langsdorfia albescens Ureta, 1957

Species of moth

Langsdorfia albescens is a moth in the family Cossidae. It is found in Chile.
