= Philiodoron =

Scientific classification
- Kingdom: Animalia
- Phylum: Arthropoda
- Clade: Pancrustacea
- Class: Insecta
- Order: Lepidoptera
- Family: Cossidae
- Subfamily: Hypoptinae
- Genus: Philiodoron; Clench, 1957

Moth genus in family Cossidae

Philiodoron is a genus of moths in the family Cossidae.

== Species ==
- Philiodoron cinereum Clench, 1957
- Philiodoron frater Clench, 1957
