= Hypopta invidiosa =

Scientific classification
- Domain: Eukaryota
- Kingdom: Animalia
- Phylum: Arthropoda
- Class: Insecta
- Order: Lepidoptera
- Family: Cossidae
- Genus: Hypopta
- Species: H. invidiosa

Binomial name
- Hypopta invidiosa Dognin, 1923

Species of moth

Hypopta invidiosa is a moth in the family Cossidae. It is found in the Amazon region.
