= Hypopta monsalvei =

Scientific classification
- Kingdom: Animalia
- Phylum: Arthropoda
- Class: Insecta
- Order: Lepidoptera
- Family: Cossidae
- Genus: Hypopta
- Species: H. monsalvei

Binomial name
- Hypopta monsalvei Ureta, 1957

Species of moth

Hypopta monsalvei is a moth in the family Cossidae. It is found in Chile.
