= Givira moche =

Scientific classification
- Kingdom: Animalia
- Phylum: Arthropoda
- Clade: Pancrustacea
- Class: Insecta
- Order: Lepidoptera
- Family: Cossidae
- Genus: Givira
- Species: G. moche

Binomial name
- Givira moche Dognin, 1905

Species of moth

Givira moche is a species of moth in the family Cossidae. It is found in Peru.
