= Givira roxana =

Scientific classification
- Kingdom: Animalia
- Phylum: Arthropoda
- Clade: Pancrustacea
- Class: Insecta
- Order: Lepidoptera
- Family: Cossidae
- Genus: Givira
- Species: G. roxana

Binomial name
- Givira roxana (H. Druce, 1911)

Synonyms
- Zeuzera roxana H. Druce, 1911

Species of moth

Givira roxana is a moth in the family Cossidae first described by Herbert Druce in 1911. It is found in Colombia.
