= Givira tucumanata =

Scientific classification
- Kingdom: Animalia
- Phylum: Arthropoda
- Clade: Pancrustacea
- Class: Insecta
- Order: Lepidoptera
- Family: Cossidae
- Genus: Givira
- Species: G. tucumanata

Binomial name
- Givira tucumanata Dognin, 1910

Species of moth

Givira tucumanata is a moth in the family Cossidae. It is found in Argentina.
