= Psychogena miranda =

Scientific classification
- Kingdom: Animalia
- Phylum: Arthropoda
- Class: Insecta
- Order: Lepidoptera
- Family: Cossidae
- Genus: Psychogena
- Species: P. miranda

Binomial name
- Psychogena miranda Schaus, 1911

Species of moth

Psychogena miranda is a moth in the family Cossidae. It is found in Costa Rica.
