= Givira quadra =

Scientific classification
- Kingdom: Animalia
- Phylum: Arthropoda
- Clade: Pancrustacea
- Class: Insecta
- Order: Lepidoptera
- Family: Cossidae
- Genus: Givira
- Species: G. quadra

Binomial name
- Givira quadra (Schaus, 1901)

Synonyms
- Eugivira quadra Schaus, 1901

Species of moth

Givira quadra is a moth in the family Cossidae described by William Schaus in 1901. It is found in Costa Rica, Brazil and Paraguay.

The wingspan is about 37 mm. The forewing costa is whitish with four black spots, a long black streak and then a shorter black streak. The cell is whitish, irrorated with light brown. The basal half of the wing is reddish brown. The hindwings are whitish, irrorated with brown and with traces of broken lines towards the apex. There is an indistinct greyish spot at the end of the cell.
