= Hypopta ambigua =

Scientific classification
- Kingdom: Animalia
- Phylum: Arthropoda
- Class: Insecta
- Order: Lepidoptera
- Family: Cossidae
- Genus: Hypopta
- Species: H. ambigua

Binomial name
- Hypopta ambigua Hübner, 1818

Species of moth

Hypopta ambigua is a moth in the family Cossidae. It is found in Paraguay.
