= Givira amanosa =

Scientific classification
- Kingdom: Animalia
- Phylum: Arthropoda
- Clade: Pancrustacea
- Class: Insecta
- Order: Lepidoptera
- Family: Cossidae
- Genus: Givira
- Species: G. amanosa

Binomial name
- Givira amanosa Schaus, 1911

Species of moth

Givira amanosa is a moth in the family Cossidae. It is found in Costa Rica.
