= Langsdorfia argentata =

Scientific classification
- Kingdom: Animalia
- Phylum: Arthropoda
- Class: Insecta
- Order: Lepidoptera
- Family: Cossidae
- Genus: Langsdorfia
- Species: L. argentata

Binomial name
- Langsdorfia argentata Köhler, 1924

Species of moth

Langsdorfia argentata is a moth in the family Cossidae. It is found in Argentina.
