= Givira eureca =

Scientific classification
- Kingdom: Animalia
- Phylum: Arthropoda
- Clade: Pancrustacea
- Class: Insecta
- Order: Lepidoptera
- Family: Cossidae
- Genus: Givira
- Species: G. eureca

Binomial name
- Givira eureca (Schaus, 1921)

Synonyms
- Lentagena eureca Schaus, 1921

Species of moth

Givira eureca is a moth in the family Cossidae. It is found in Guatemala.

The wingspan is about 43 mm. The forewings are silky, greyish white, with some dark brown striae except on the extreme costa. The inner margin is shaded with brown. The hindwings are fuscous grey.
