= Hypopta triarcatata =

Scientific classification
- Domain: Eukaryota
- Kingdom: Animalia
- Phylum: Arthropoda
- Class: Insecta
- Order: Lepidoptera
- Family: Cossidae
- Genus: Hypopta
- Species: H. triarcatata

Binomial name
- Hypopta triarcatata Schaus, 1905

Species of moth

Hypopta triarcatata is a moth in the family Cossidae. It is found in French Guiana.
