= Givira quadroides =

Scientific classification
- Kingdom: Animalia
- Phylum: Arthropoda
- Clade: Pancrustacea
- Class: Insecta
- Order: Lepidoptera
- Family: Cossidae
- Genus: Givira
- Species: G. quadroides

Binomial name
- Givira quadroides (Hering, 1923)

Synonyms
- Eugivira quadroides Hering, 1923

Species of moth

Givira quadroides is a moth in the family Cossidae. It is found in Brazil.
