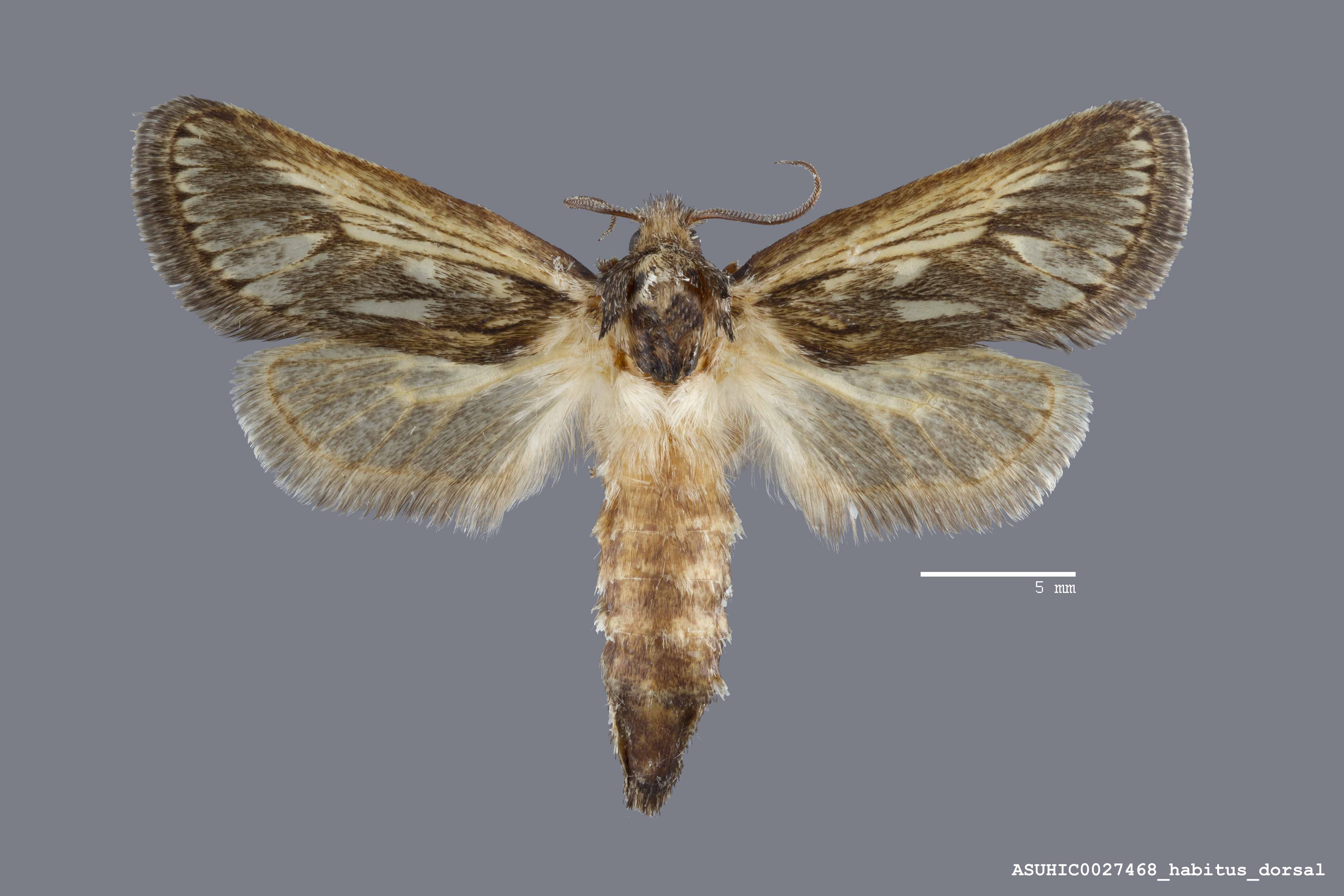

Scientific classification
- Domain: Eukaryota
- Kingdom: Animalia
- Phylum: Arthropoda
- Class: Insecta
- Order: Lepidoptera
- Family: Cossidae
- Genus: Hypopta
- Species: H. palmata

Binomial name
- Hypopta palmata Barnes & McDunnough, 1910

= Hypopta palmata =

Species of moth

Hypopta palmata is a moth in the family Cossidae first described by William Barnes and James Halliday McDunnough in 1910. It is found in North America, where it has been recorded from western Texas, Arizona, Nevada, California and Baja California Norte. The habitat consists of deserts and desert mountains.

The length of the forewings is 13–15.5 mm for males and up to 20 mm for females. Adults have been recorded on wing from May to September.
