= Givira carla =

Scientific classification
- Kingdom: Animalia
- Phylum: Arthropoda
- Clade: Pancrustacea
- Class: Insecta
- Order: Lepidoptera
- Family: Cossidae
- Genus: Givira
- Species: G. carla

Binomial name
- Givira carla Dyar, 1923

Species of moth

Givira carla is a moth in the family Cossidae. It is found in North America, where it has been recorded from California and Arizona.
