= Givira saladota =

Scientific classification
- Kingdom: Animalia
- Phylum: Arthropoda
- Clade: Pancrustacea
- Class: Insecta
- Order: Lepidoptera
- Family: Cossidae
- Genus: Givira
- Species: G. saladota

Binomial name
- Givira saladota (Dognin, 1911)

Synonyms
- Eugivira saladota Dognin, 1911

Species of moth

Givira saladota is a moth in the family Cossidae. It is found in Argentina.
