= Givira perfida =

Scientific classification
- Kingdom: Animalia
- Phylum: Arthropoda
- Clade: Pancrustacea
- Class: Insecta
- Order: Lepidoptera
- Family: Cossidae
- Genus: Givira
- Species: G. perfida

Binomial name
- Givira perfida (Schaus, 1921)

Synonyms
- Lentagena perfida Schaus, 1921

Species of moth

Givira perfida is a moth belonging to the Cossidae family. It is found in Guatemala.

It has a wingspan of approximately 29 millimeters. The forewings feature a pale brown costal margin adorned with large fuscous spots that are edged in white. The base color is brown, segmented into spots by a white subbasal line and the veins. The hindwings are predominantly white, punctuated by numerous dark spots and thick striae.
