= Givira difflua =

Scientific classification
- Kingdom: Animalia
- Phylum: Arthropoda
- Clade: Pancrustacea
- Class: Insecta
- Order: Lepidoptera
- Family: Cossidae
- Genus: Givira
- Species: G. difflua

Binomial name
- Givira difflua Dognin, 1920

Species of moth

Givira difflua is a moth in the family Cossidae. It is found in Argentina.
