= Hypopta superba =

Scientific classification
- Domain: Eukaryota
- Kingdom: Animalia
- Phylum: Arthropoda
- Class: Insecta
- Order: Lepidoptera
- Family: Cossidae
- Genus: Hypopta
- Species: H. superba

Binomial name
- Hypopta superba Berg, 1882

Species of moth

Hypopta superba is a moth in the family Cossidae. It is found in Argentina and Brazil.

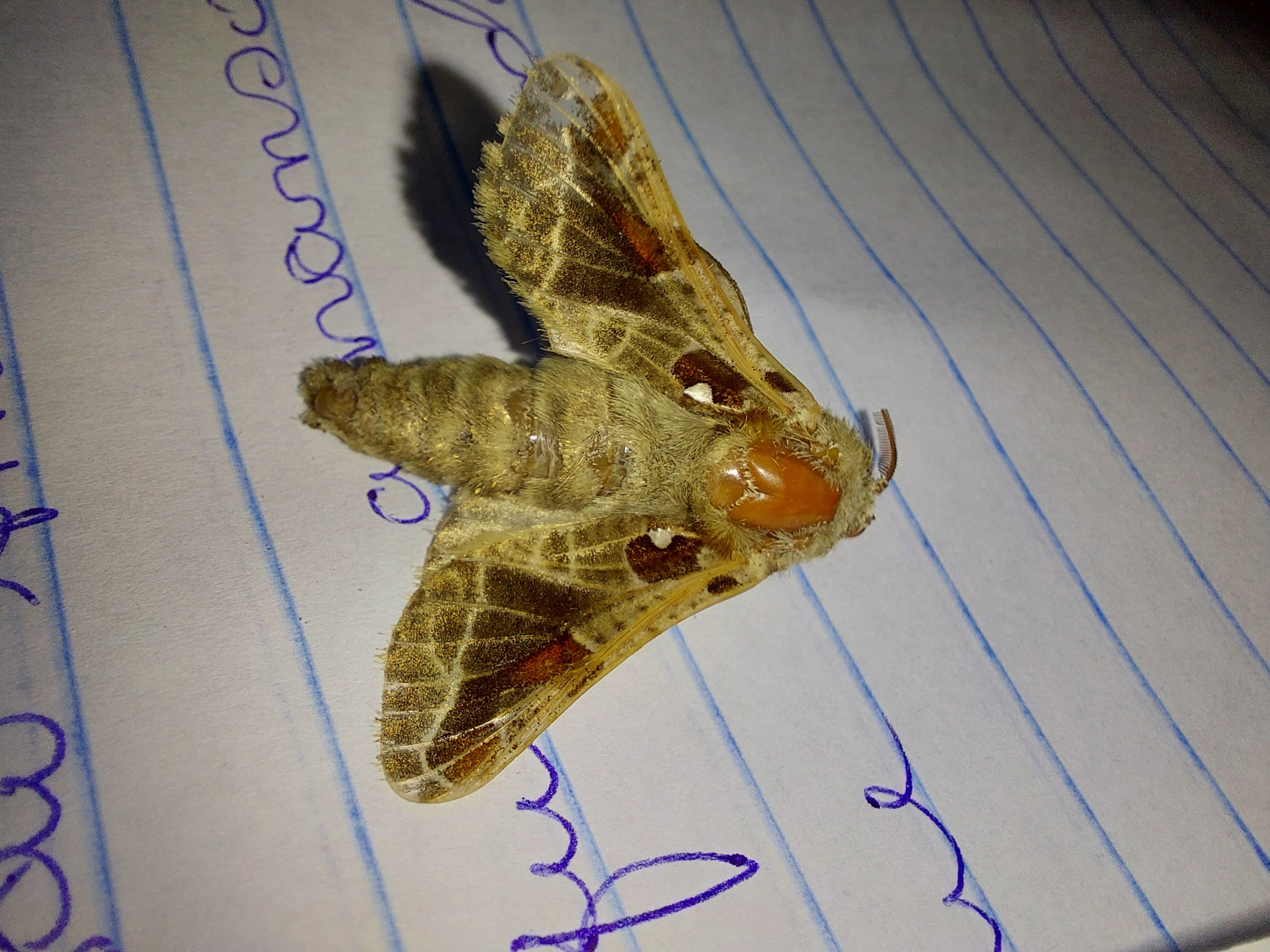
Hypopta superba observation in Virginopolis, Minas Gerais, Brazil, by Filipi Miranda Soares (CC-By 4.0)
