= Givira morosa =

Scientific classification
- Kingdom: Animalia
- Phylum: Arthropoda
- Clade: Pancrustacea
- Class: Insecta
- Order: Lepidoptera
- Family: Cossidae
- Genus: Givira
- Species: G. morosa

Binomial name
- Givira morosa Schaus, 1911

Species of moth

Givira morosa is a moth in the family Cossidae. It is found in Costa Rica.

The wingspan is about 37 mm. The forewings are steel-grey, reticulated with black brown. The hindwings are whitish, reticulated with brown. The inner margin is brownish.
