= Hypopta pallidicosta =

Scientific classification
- Domain: Eukaryota
- Kingdom: Animalia
- Phylum: Arthropoda
- Class: Insecta
- Order: Lepidoptera
- Family: Cossidae
- Genus: Hypopta
- Species: H. pallidicosta

Binomial name
- Hypopta pallidicosta (Schaus, 1901)

Synonyms
- Eugivira pallidicosta Schaus, 1901

Species of moth

Hypopta pallidicosta is a moth in the family Cossidae. It was described by William Schaus in 1901 and it is found in Paraná, Brazil.

The wingspan is about 24 mm. The forewings are white from the costa to near the apex, shaded with dark brown below through the cell and to apex. The basal half of the wing and the inner margin is shaded with reddish brown, otherwise the wing is pale grey with about seven broken transverse brownish lines. The hindwings are white.
