= Inguromorpha roseobrunnea =

Scientific classification
- Domain: Eukaryota
- Kingdom: Animalia
- Phylum: Arthropoda
- Class: Insecta
- Order: Lepidoptera
- Family: Cossidae
- Genus: Inguromorpha
- Species: I. roseobrunnea

Binomial name
- Inguromorpha roseobrunnea (Dognin, 1917)

Synonyms
- Miacora roseobrunnea Dognin, 1917

Species of moth

Inguromorpha roseobrunnea is a moth in the family Cossidae. It was described by Paul Dognin in 1917. It is found in French Guiana.
