= Langsdorfia xylodopoecila =

Scientific classification
- Kingdom: Animalia
- Phylum: Arthropoda
- Class: Insecta
- Order: Lepidoptera
- Family: Cossidae
- Genus: Langsdorfia
- Species: L. xylodopoecila

Binomial name
- Langsdorfia xylodopoecila Zukowsky, 1954

Species of moth

Langsdorfia xylodopoecila is a moth in the family Cossidae.
