= Langsdorfia pallida =

Scientific classification
- Kingdom: Animalia
- Phylum: Arthropoda
- Class: Insecta
- Order: Lepidoptera
- Family: Cossidae
- Genus: Langsdorfia
- Species: L. pallida

Binomial name
- Langsdorfia pallida H. Druce, 1911

Species of moth

Langsdorfia pallida is a moth in the family Cossidae first described by Herbert Druce in 1911. It is found in Chile.
