= Givira isarba =

Scientific classification
- Kingdom: Animalia
- Phylum: Arthropoda
- Clade: Pancrustacea
- Class: Insecta
- Order: Lepidoptera
- Family: Cossidae
- Genus: Givira
- Species: G. isarba

Binomial name
- Givira isarba Schaus, 1934

Species of moth

Givira isarba is a moth in the family Cossidae. It is found in Argentina.
