= Hypopta aethiops =

Scientific classification
- Domain: Eukaryota
- Kingdom: Animalia
- Phylum: Arthropoda
- Class: Insecta
- Order: Lepidoptera
- Family: Cossidae
- Genus: Hypopta
- Species: H. aethiops

Binomial name
- Hypopta aethiops (Herrich-Schäffer, 1855)

Synonyms
- Cossus aethiops Herrich-Schäffer, 1855

Species of moth

Hypopta aethiops is a moth in the family Cossidae. It is found in South America.
