= Philiodoron frater =

Scientific classification
- Kingdom: Animalia
- Phylum: Arthropoda
- Clade: Pancrustacea
- Class: Insecta
- Order: Lepidoptera
- Family: Cossidae
- Genus: Philiodoron
- Species: P. frater

Binomial name
- Philiodoron frater H.K. Clench, 1957

Species of moth

Philiodoron frater is a moth in the family Cossidae. It is found in Chile.

Adults are extremely similar to Philiodoron cinereum, but the genitalia show them to be distinct.
