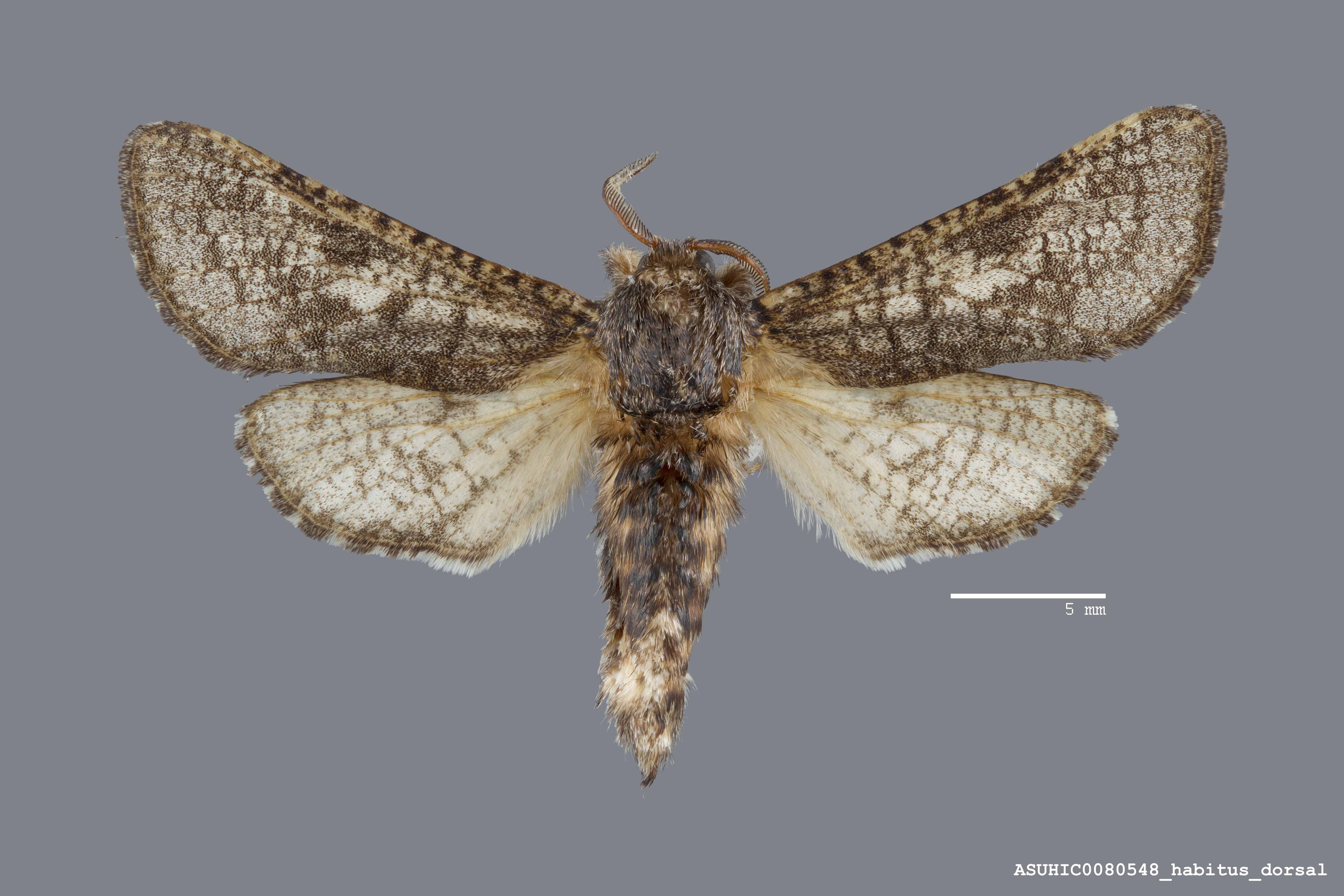
- Givira mucidus

Scientific classification
- Kingdom: Animalia
- Phylum: Arthropoda
- Clade: Pancrustacea
- Class: Insecta
- Order: Lepidoptera
- Family: Cossidae
- Genus: Givira
- Species: G. mucida

Binomial name
- Givira mucida (Edwards, 1882)

Synonyms
- Cossus mucidus Edwards, 1882; Givira mucidus

= Givira mucida =

Species of moth

Givira mucida is a moth in the family Cossidae. It is found in North America, where it has been recorded from California east to south-eastern New Mexico.

The wingspan is 36–40 mm. Adults have been recorded on wing from April to September.
