= Langsdorfia marmorata =

Scientific classification
- Kingdom: Animalia
- Phylum: Arthropoda
- Class: Insecta
- Order: Lepidoptera
- Family: Cossidae
- Genus: Langsdorfia
- Species: L. marmorata

Binomial name
- Langsdorfia marmorata Maasen, 1890

Species of moth

Langsdorfia marmorata is a moth in the family Cossidae. It is found in Ecuador.
