= Givira fidelis =

Scientific classification
- Kingdom: Animalia
- Phylum: Arthropoda
- Clade: Pancrustacea
- Class: Insecta
- Order: Lepidoptera
- Family: Cossidae
- Genus: Givira
- Species: G. fidelis

Binomial name
- Givira fidelis Schaus, 1911

Species of moth

Givira fidelis is a moth in the family Cossidae. It is found in Costa Rica.

The wingspan is about 33 mm. The base, costal and inner margins, and median vein on the forewings are lilac brown, crossed by darker brown striae. There is a velvety black line along the inner margin from near the base to beyond the middle. The hindwings are fuscous grey, thinly scaled in the discal and postmedial area and with some indistinct darker striae.
