= Hypopta vassilia =

Scientific classification
- Kingdom: Animalia
- Phylum: Arthropoda
- Clade: Pancrustacea
- Class: Insecta
- Order: Lepidoptera
- Family: Cossidae
- Genus: Hypopta
- Species: H. vassilia

Binomial name
- Hypopta vassilia Schaus, 1921

Species of moth

Hypopta vassilia is a moth in the family Cossidae. It is found in Guatemala.

The wingspan is about 30 mm. The veins and cilia on the inner margin of the forewings are whitish. The space between two veins is pale grey with some dark brown spots. The costa is fuscous, cut into elongated spots by white lines. The hindwings are fuscous.
