= Hypopta clymene =

Scientific classification
- Kingdom: Animalia
- Phylum: Arthropoda
- Clade: Pancrustacea
- Class: Insecta
- Order: Lepidoptera
- Family: Cossidae
- Genus: Hypopta
- Species: H. clymene

Binomial name
- Hypopta clymene Schaus, 1921

Species of moth

Hypopta clymene is a moth in the family Cossidae. It is found in Guatemala.

The wingspan is about 40 mm. The costal margin of the forewings is pale buff with some black striae. The base and medial space below the cell to the inner margin is brown, with some fuscous lines on the inner margin and a larger subbasal black spot on the costa. The hindwings are dark grey with a whitish costa.
