= Langsdorfia forreri =

Scientific classification
- Kingdom: Animalia
- Phylum: Arthropoda
- Class: Insecta
- Order: Lepidoptera
- Family: Cossidae
- Genus: Langsdorfia
- Species: L. forreri

Binomial name
- Langsdorfia forreri H. Druce, 1887

Species of moth

Langsdorfia forreri is a moth in the family Cossidae first described by Herbert Druce in 1887. It is found in Mexico and Honduras.
