= Givira hypomelaleuca =

Scientific classification
- Kingdom: Animalia
- Phylum: Arthropoda
- Clade: Pancrustacea
- Class: Insecta
- Order: Lepidoptera
- Family: Cossidae
- Genus: Givira
- Species: G. hypomelaleuca

Binomial name
- Givira hypomelaleuca Zukowsky, 1954

Species of moth

Givira hypomelaleuca is a moth in the family Cossidae. It is found in Peru.
