= Givira platea =

Scientific classification
- Kingdom: Animalia
- Phylum: Arthropoda
- Clade: Pancrustacea
- Class: Insecta
- Order: Lepidoptera
- Family: Cossidae
- Genus: Givira
- Species: G. platea

Binomial name
- Givira platea Schaus, 1901

Species of moth

Givira platea is a moth in the family Cossidae. It was described by William Schaus in 1901 and it is found in Brazil.

The wingspan is about 26 mm. The forewings are brown, irrorated (sprinkled) with black and with yellowish veins. The hindwings are brown with a buff costal margin.
