= Rhizocossus =

Scientific classification
- Kingdom: Animalia
- Phylum: Arthropoda
- Clade: Pancrustacea
- Class: Insecta
- Order: Lepidoptera
- Family: Cossidae
- Subfamily: Chilecomadiinae
- Genus: Rhizocossus; Clench, 1957
- Species: R. munroei

Binomial name
- Rhizocossus munroei Clench, 1957

Genus of moths

Rhizocossus munroei is a moth in the family Cossidae. It is the only species in the genus Rhizocossus. It is found in Chile.

The length of the forewings is 18.5–22 mm.

== Etymology ==
The species is named in honour of Dr. Eugene G. Munroe.
