= Breyeriana =

Scientific classification
- Kingdom: Animalia
- Phylum: Arthropoda
- Class: Insecta
- Order: Lepidoptera
- Family: Cossidae
- Subfamily: Hypoptinae
- Genus: Breyeriana; Orfila, 1957
- Species: B. cistransandina

Binomial name
- Breyeriana cistransandina Orfila, 1957

Species of moth

Breyeriana cistransandina is a moth in the family Cossidae, and the only species in the genus Breyeriana. It is found in Argentina and Chile.
