= Givira clathrata =

Scientific classification
- Kingdom: Animalia
- Phylum: Arthropoda
- Clade: Pancrustacea
- Class: Insecta
- Order: Lepidoptera
- Family: Cossidae
- Genus: Givira
- Species: G. clathrata

Binomial name
- Givira clathrata (Dognin, 1910)

Synonyms
- Hypopta clathrata Dognin, 1910

Species of moth

Givira clathrata is a moth in the family Cossidae. It is found in French Guiana.
