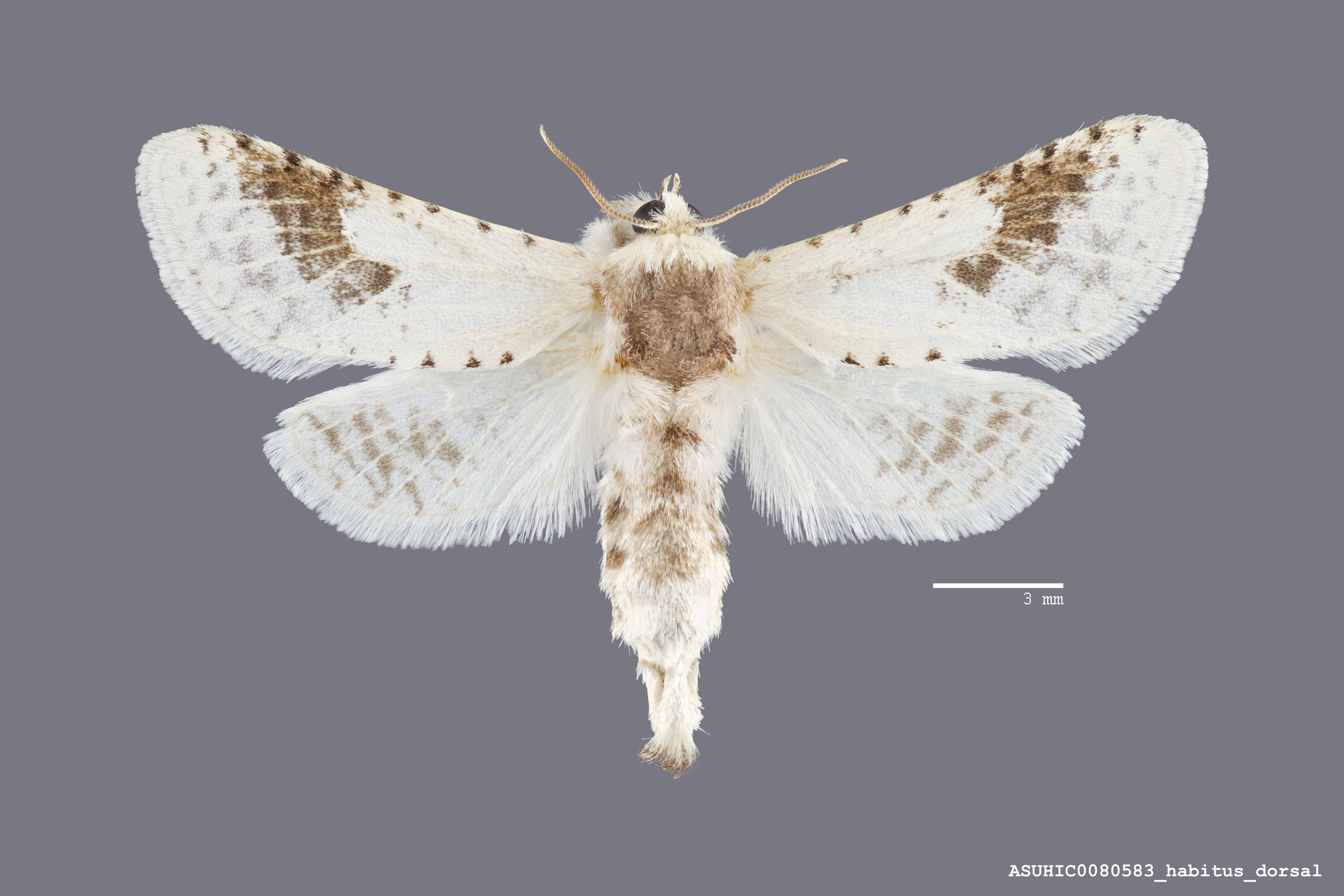

Scientific classification
- Kingdom: Animalia
- Phylum: Arthropoda
- Clade: Pancrustacea
- Class: Insecta
- Order: Lepidoptera
- Family: Cossidae
- Genus: Givira
- Species: G. theodori

Binomial name
- Givira theodori (Dyar, 1893)

Synonyms
- Hypopta theodori Dyar, 1893; Givira kunzei Dyar, 1923

= Givira theodori =

Species of moth

Givira theodori is a moth in the family Cossidae. It is found in the United States, where it has been recorded from Arizona, Colorado, Utah, New Mexico and Texas.

The wingspan is about 26 mm. Adults have been recorded on wing from April to September.

== Etymology ==
The species is named in honor of Theodore Dru Alison Cockerell, who collected the species.
