= Givira australis =

Scientific classification
- Kingdom: Animalia
- Phylum: Arthropoda
- Clade: Pancrustacea
- Class: Insecta
- Order: Lepidoptera
- Family: Cossidae
- Genus: Givira
- Species: G. australis

Binomial name
- Givira australis Ureta, 1957

Species of moth

Givira australis is a moth in the family Cossidae. It is found in Chile.
