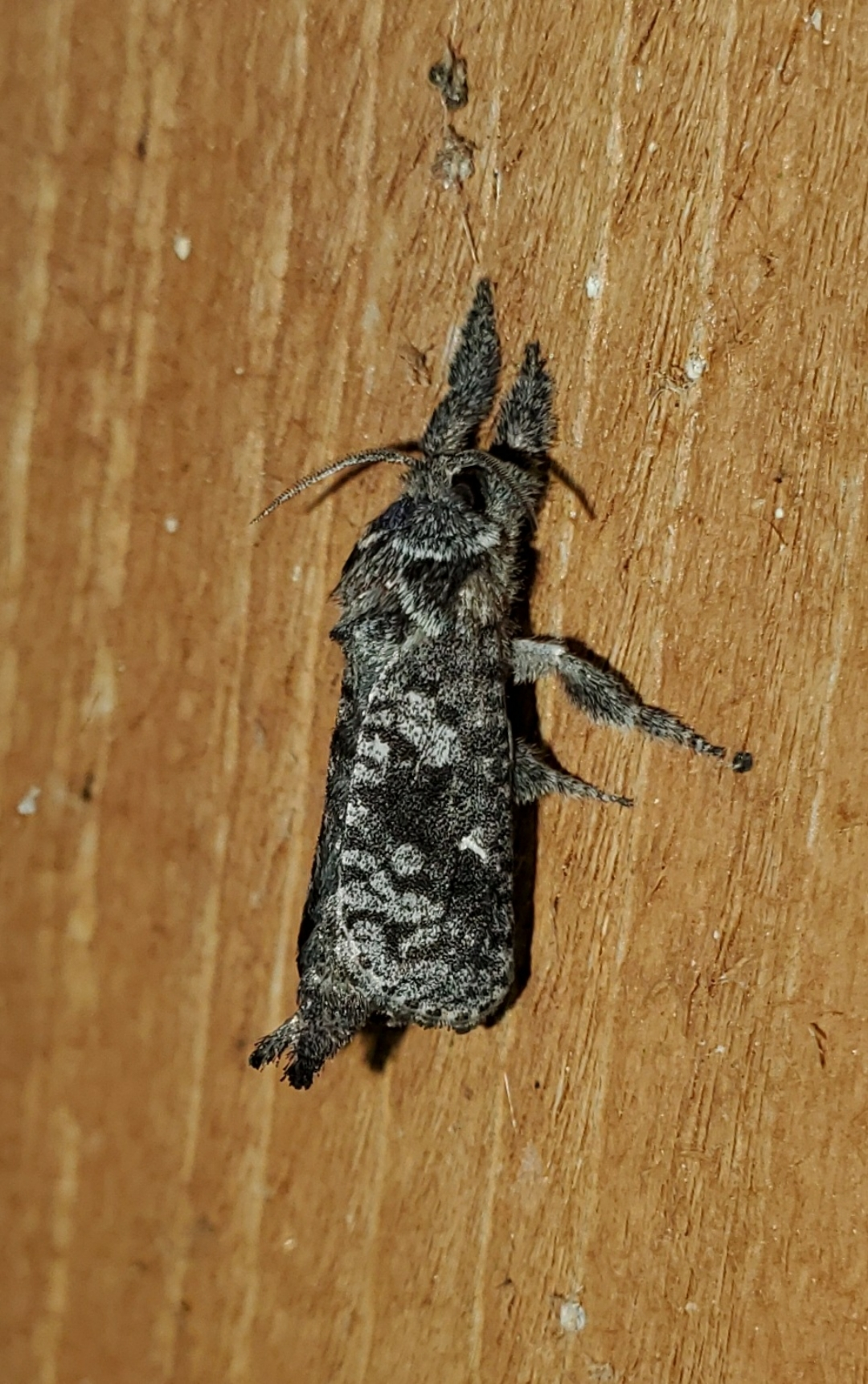

Scientific classification
- Kingdom: Animalia
- Phylum: Arthropoda
- Clade: Pancrustacea
- Class: Insecta
- Order: Lepidoptera
- Family: Cossidae
- Genus: Givira
- Species: G. francesca

Binomial name
- Givira francesca (Dyar, 1909)

Synonyms
- Hypopta francesca Dyar, 1909

= Givira francesca =

Species of moth

Givira francesca is a moth in the family Cossidae. It is found in North America, where it has been recorded in Alabama, Florida, Mississippi, North Carolina and South Carolina.

The wingspan is 22–27 mm. Adults have been recorded on wing year round.

The larvae bore in the bark of Pinus trunks.
