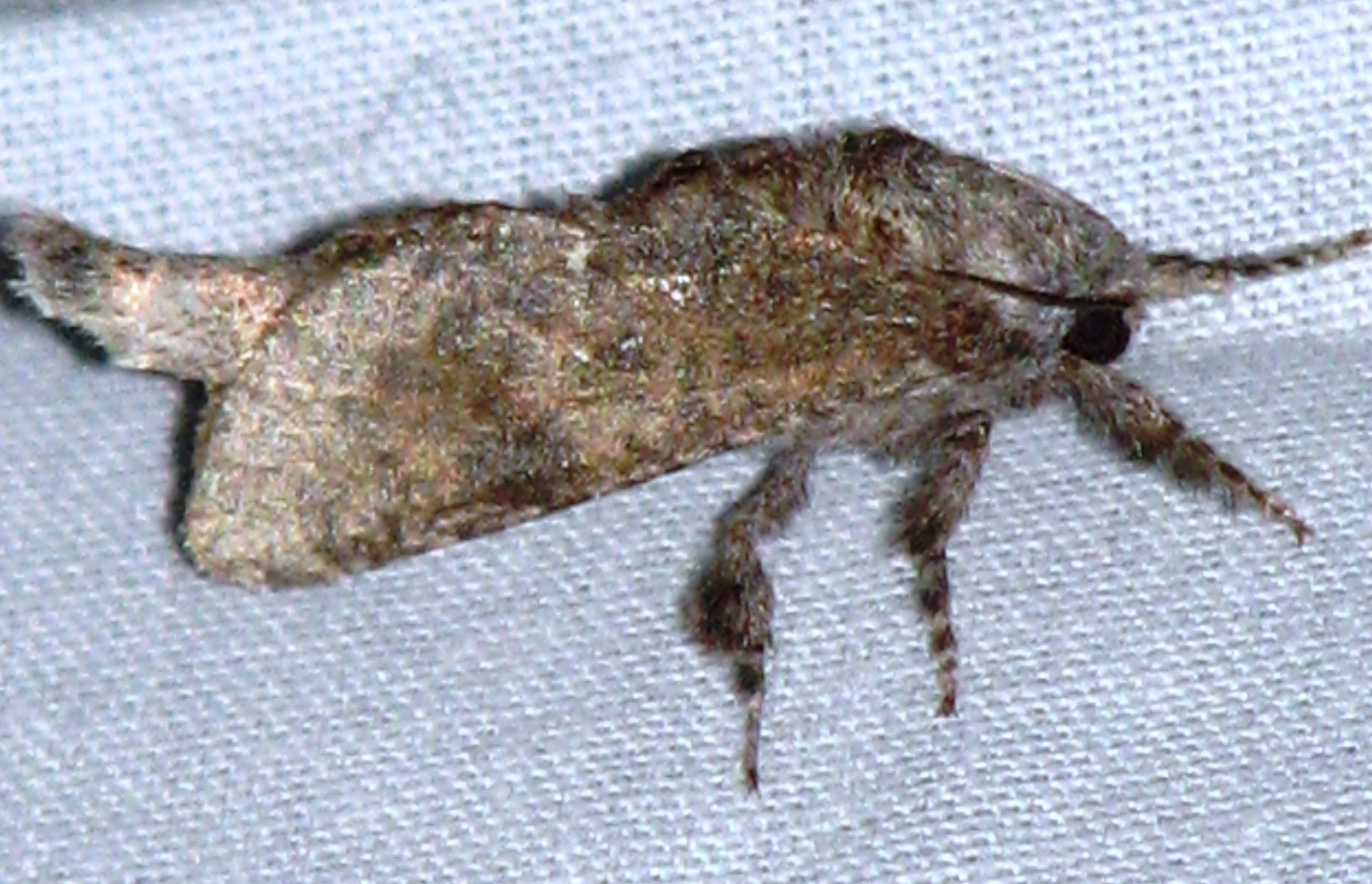

Scientific classification
- Kingdom: Animalia
- Phylum: Arthropoda
- Clade: Pancrustacea
- Class: Insecta
- Order: Lepidoptera
- Family: Cossidae
- Genus: Givira
- Species: G. arbeloides

Binomial name
- Givira arbeloides (Dyar, 1899)

Synonyms
- Inguromorpha arbeloides Dyar, 1899; Eugivira arbeloides

= Givira arbeloides =

Species of moth

Givira arbeloides is a moth in the family Cossidae. It is found in North America, where it has been recorded from Arizona, Arkansas, Louisiana, Mississippi and Texas.

The wingspan is about 27 mm. Adults have been recorded on wing from April to October.
