= Inguromorpha polybia =

Scientific classification
- Kingdom: Animalia
- Phylum: Arthropoda
- Class: Insecta
- Order: Lepidoptera
- Family: Cossidae
- Genus: Inguromorpha
- Species: I. polybia

Binomial name
- Inguromorpha polybia (Schaus, 1892)

Synonyms
- Langsdorfia polybia Schaus, 1892

Species of moth

Inguromorpha polybia, the little bark, is a moth in the family Cossidae. It is found in Brazil, Venezuela, Ecuador and Peru. The habitat consists of cloudforests at altitudes between 400 and 1,200 meters (1,300 and 3,900 ft).
