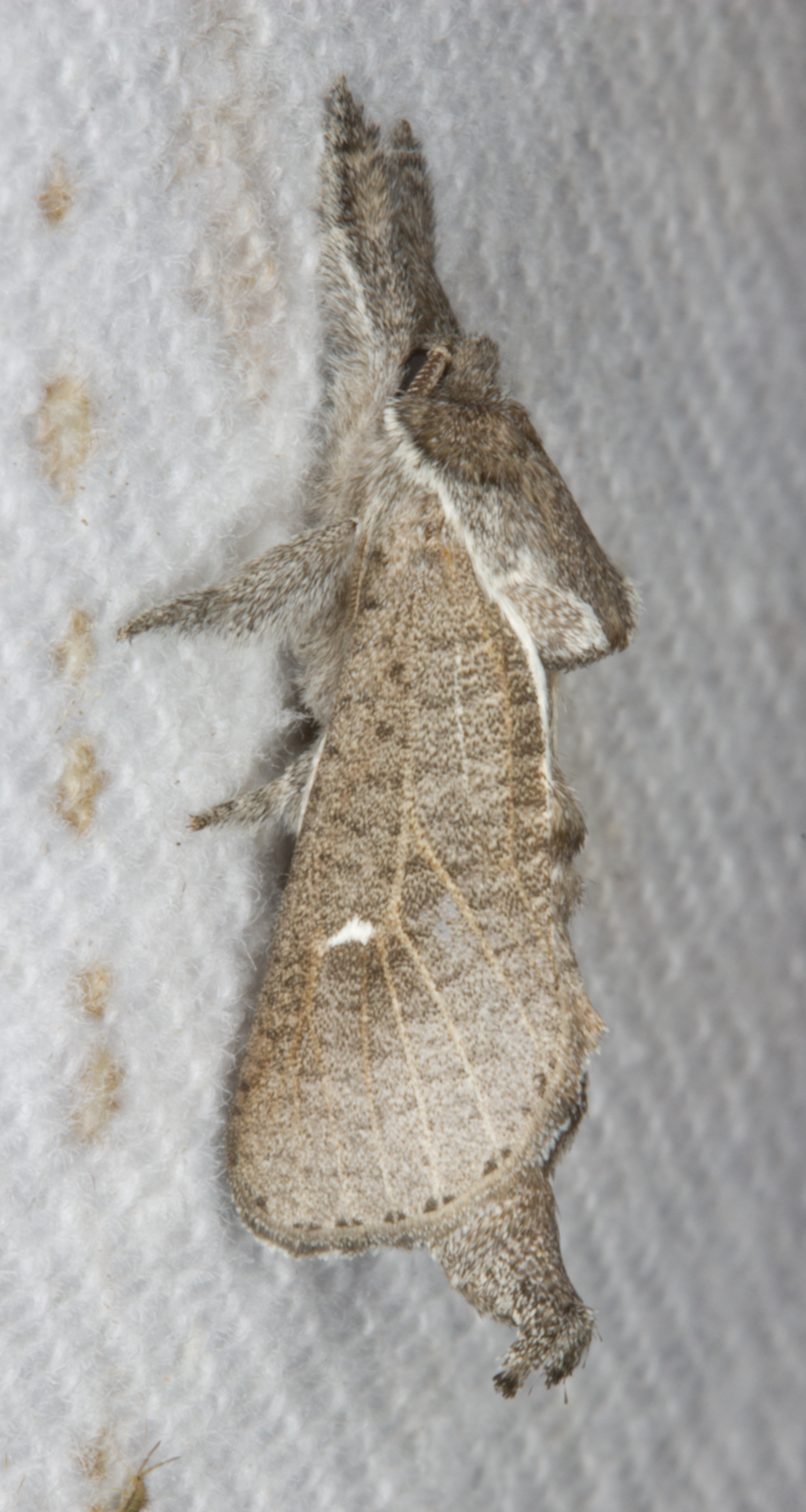
- Givira anna

Scientific classification
- Kingdom: Animalia
- Phylum: Arthropoda
- Clade: Pancrustacea
- Class: Insecta
- Order: Lepidoptera
- Family: Cossidae
- Genus: Givira
- Species: G. anna

Binomial name
- Givira anna (Dyar, 1898)

Synonyms
- Hypopta anna Dyar, 1898

= Givira anna =

Species of moth

Givira anna, the anna carpenterworm moth, is a moth that belongs to the family Cossidae. It is found in North America, where it has been recorded from Alabama, Arkansas, Florida, Georgia, Indiana, Kansas, Kentucky, Louisiana, Maryland, Mississippi, North Carolina, Oklahoma, South Carolina, Tennessee and Texas.

The wingspan is 25–36 mm. Adults have been recorded on wing from March to August.
