= Hypopta brunneomaculata =

Scientific classification
- Kingdom: Animalia
- Phylum: Arthropoda
- Class: Insecta
- Order: Lepidoptera
- Family: Cossidae
- Genus: Hypopta
- Species: H. brunneomaculata

Binomial name
- Hypopta brunneomaculata (Dyar & Schaus, 1937)

Synonyms
- Langsdorfia brunneomaculata Dyar & Schaus, 1937

Species of moth

Hypopta brunneomaculata is a moth in the family Cossidae. It is found in Peru.
