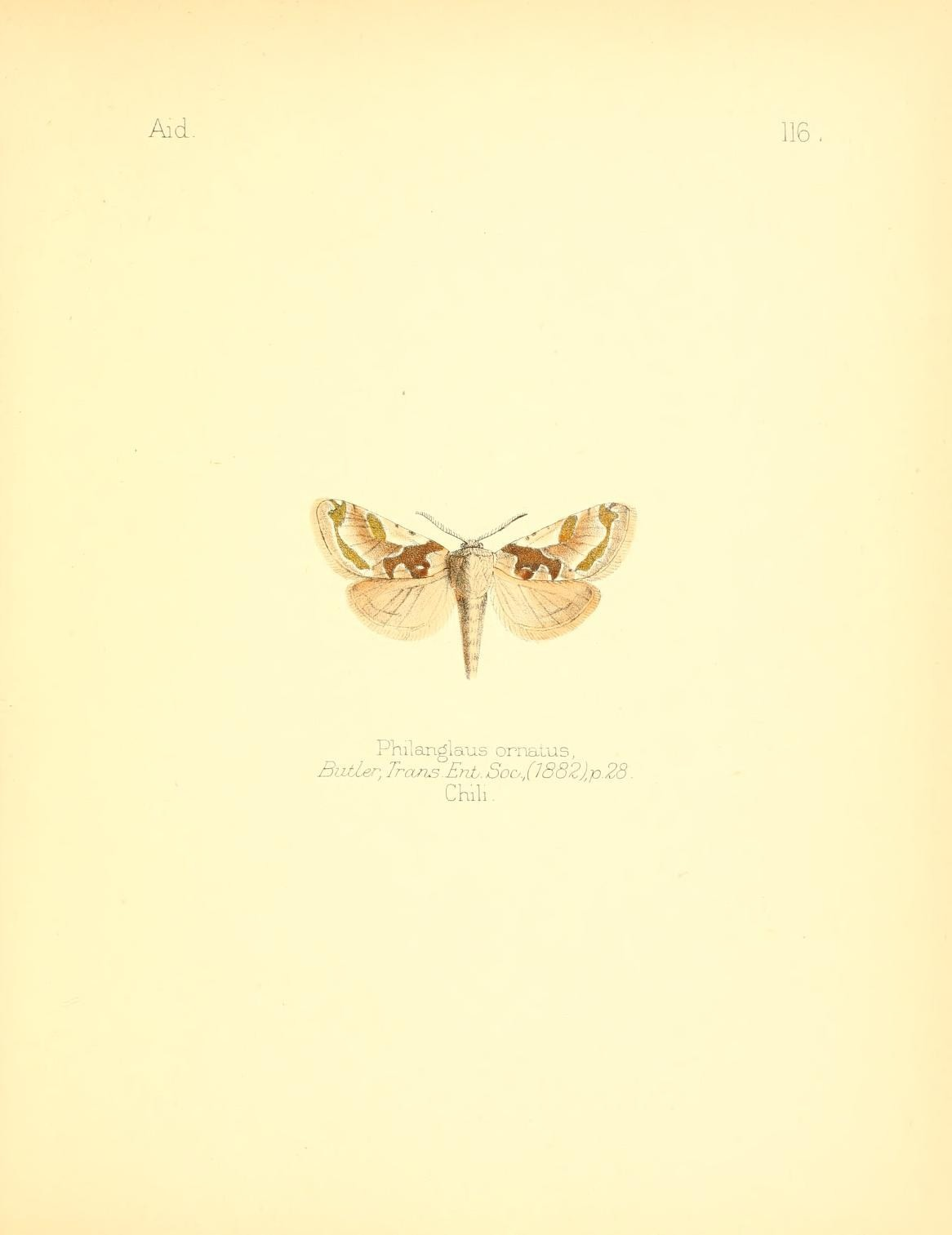

Scientific classification
- Kingdom: Animalia
- Phylum: Arthropoda
- Class: Insecta
- Order: Lepidoptera
- Family: Cossidae
- Genus: Langsdorfia
- Species: L. ornatus

Binomial name
- Langsdorfia ornatus (Butler, 1882)

Synonyms
- Philanglaus ornatus Butler, 1882

= Langsdorfia ornatus =

Species of moth

Langsdorfia ornatus is a moth in the family Cossidae. It is found in Chile.
