= Givira ethela =

Scientific classification
- Kingdom: Animalia
- Phylum: Arthropoda
- Clade: Pancrustacea
- Class: Insecta
- Order: Lepidoptera
- Family: Cossidae
- Genus: Givira
- Species: G. ethela

Binomial name
- Givira ethela (Neumoegen & Dyar, 1893)

Synonyms
- Hypopta ethela Neumoegen & Dyar, 1893

Species of moth

Givira ethela is a moth in the family Cossidae. It is found in North America, where it has been recorded from Arizona, California and Nevada.

Adults have been recorded on wing from July to August.
