= Givira aroa =

Scientific classification
- Kingdom: Animalia
- Phylum: Arthropoda
- Clade: Pancrustacea
- Class: Insecta
- Order: Lepidoptera
- Family: Cossidae
- Genus: Givira
- Species: G. aroa

Binomial name
- Givira aroa (Schaus, 1894)

Synonyms
- Langsdorfia aroa Schaus, 1894

Species of moth

Givira aroa is a moth in the family Cossidae. It is found in Venezuela.
