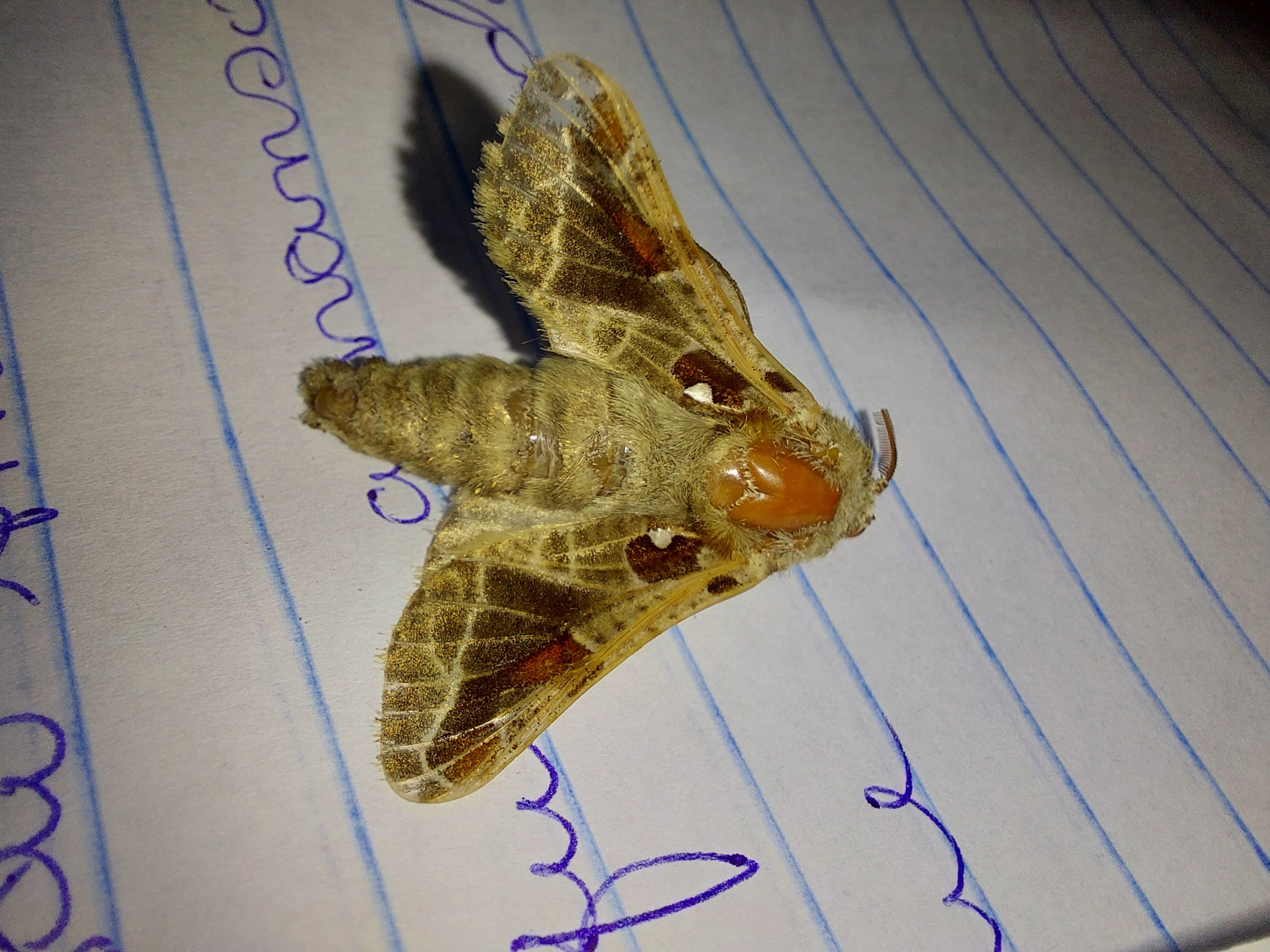
- Hypopta superba

Scientific classification
- Kingdom: Animalia
- Phylum: Arthropoda
- Class: Insecta
- Order: Lepidoptera
- Family: Cossidae
- Subfamily: Hypoptinae; Neumoegen & Dyar, 1894

= Hypoptinae =

Subfamily of moths

The Hypoptinae are a subfamily of the family Cossidae (carpenter or goat moths).

== Genera ==
- Acousmaticus Butler, 1882
- Breyeriana Orfila, 1957
- Givarbela Clench, 1957
- Givira Walker, 1856
- Hypopta Hübner, 1820
- Inguromorpha H.Edwards, 1888 (tentatively placed here)
- Langsdorfia Hübner, [1821]
- Philiodoron Clench, 1957
- Psychogena Schaus, 1911
- Puseyia Dyar, 1937

== Former genera ==
- Philanglaus Butler, 1882
- Pomeria Barnes & McDunnough, 1911
