= Givira salome =

Scientific classification
- Kingdom: Animalia
- Phylum: Arthropoda
- Clade: Pancrustacea
- Class: Insecta
- Order: Lepidoptera
- Family: Cossidae
- Genus: Givira
- Species: G. salome

Binomial name
- Givira salome (Dyar, 1910)

Synonyms
- Hypopta salome

Species of moth

Givira salome is a moth in the family Cossidae. It is found from Mexico through Costa Rica.
