= Inguromorpha itzalana =

Scientific classification
- Domain: Eukaryota
- Kingdom: Animalia
- Phylum: Arthropoda
- Class: Insecta
- Order: Lepidoptera
- Family: Cossidae
- Genus: Inguromorpha
- Species: I. itzalana

Binomial name
- Inguromorpha itzalana (Strecker, 1900)

Synonyms
- Hypopta itzalana Strecker, 1900; Pomeria itzalana

Species of moth

Inguromorpha itzalana is a moth in the family Cossidae. It is found in North America, where it has been recorded from Arizona, New Mexico and Texas. Outside of the United States, it is found from Mexico to Central America.

The wingspan is 38–44 mm. Adults have been recorded on wing from May to September.
