= Chilecomadiinae =

Scientific classification
- Kingdom: Animalia
- Phylum: Arthropoda
- Clade: Pancrustacea
- Class: Insecta
- Order: Lepidoptera
- Family: Cossidae
- Subfamily: Chilecomadiinae; Schoorl, 1990

Subfamily of moths

The Chilecomadiinae are a subfamily of the family Cossidae (carpenter or goat moths).

== Genera ==
- Chilecomadia Dyar, 1940
- Miacorella Penco, Yakovlev & Naydenov, 2020
- Rhizocossus H. K. Clench, 1957
