= Givira leonera =

Scientific classification
- Kingdom: Animalia
- Phylum: Arthropoda
- Clade: Pancrustacea
- Class: Insecta
- Order: Lepidoptera
- Family: Cossidae
- Genus: Givira
- Species: G. leonera

Binomial name
- Givira leonera H.K. Clench, 1957

Species of moth

Givira leonera is a moth in the family Cossidae. It is found in Chile.

The length of the forewings is about 13 mm.
