= Inguromorpha sterila =

Scientific classification
- Kingdom: Animalia
- Phylum: Arthropoda
- Class: Insecta
- Order: Lepidoptera
- Family: Cossidae
- Genus: Inguromorpha
- Species: I. sterila

Binomial name
- Inguromorpha sterila Dognin, 1910

Synonyms
- Hypopta sterila Dognin, 1910

Species of moth

Inguromorpha sterila is a moth in the family Cossidae. It is found in French Guiana.
