= Philiodoron cinereum =

Scientific classification
- Kingdom: Animalia
- Phylum: Arthropoda
- Clade: Pancrustacea
- Class: Insecta
- Order: Lepidoptera
- Family: Cossidae
- Genus: Philiodoron
- Species: P. cinereum

Binomial name
- Philiodoron cinereum H.K. Clench, 1957

Species of moth

Philiodoron cinereum is a moth in the family Cossidae. It is found in Chile.

The length of the forewings is 14–17.5 mm.
