= Ypsolopha buscki =

Scientific classification
- Kingdom: Animalia
- Phylum: Arthropoda
- Clade: Pancrustacea
- Class: Insecta
- Order: Lepidoptera
- Family: Ypsolophidae
- Genus: Ypsolopha
- Species: Y. buscki

Binomial name
- Ypsolopha buscki Heppner, 1982

Synonyms
- Ypsolopha manella Busck, 1903

Species of moth

Ypsolopha buscki is a moth of the family Ypsolophidae. It is known from the United States, including Arizona.

The wingspan is about 22 mm.

The antennae are light fuscous. The labial palpi are blackish fuscous on the outside and light ochreous on the inside. The tuft on the second joint is small and the terminal joint is thickened with rough scales anteriorly. The face, head and thorax are light ochreous fuscous with blackish scales. The shoulders are darker and purplish. The forewings are whitish fuscous with a violet or silvery sheen and sprinkled with light brown, dark fuscous and black scales. The hindwings are light silvery fuscous and the abdomen is silvery fuscous, sprinkled with black. The legs are whitish fuscous.

== Taxonomy ==
The species was first described as Cerostoma manella by August Busck in 1903. This name was already occupied by the species Ypsolopha manella described a year earlier by Harrison Gray Dyar Jr. In 1982 John B. Heppner published the replacement name Ypsolopha buscki.
