= Ypsolopha sculpturella =

Scientific classification
- Domain: Eukaryota
- Kingdom: Animalia
- Phylum: Arthropoda
- Class: Insecta
- Order: Lepidoptera
- Family: Ypsolophidae
- Genus: Ypsolopha
- Species: Y. sculpturella

Binomial name
- Ypsolopha sculpturella (Herrich-Schäffer, 1854)

Synonyms
- Rhinosia sculpturella Herrich-Schäffer, 1854

Species of moth

Ypsolopha sculpturella is a moth of the family Ypsolophidae. It is known from Croatia, Bulgaria, Ukraine, Greece, Crete, Turkey and Israel.

The larvae have been recorded feeding on Ephedra distachya.
