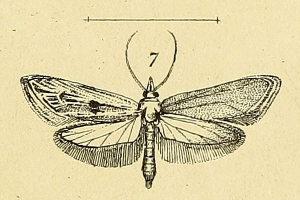

Scientific classification
- Domain: Eukaryota
- Kingdom: Animalia
- Phylum: Arthropoda
- Class: Insecta
- Order: Lepidoptera
- Family: Ypsolophidae
- Genus: Ypsolopha
- Species: Y. albiramella

Binomial name
- Ypsolopha albiramella (Mann, 1861)

Synonyms
- Plutella albiramella Mann, 1861

= Ypsolopha albiramella =

Species of moth

Ypsolopha albiramella is a moth of the family Ypsolophidae. It is known from Italy, Croatia, Albania, North Macedonia, Greece, Crete and Turkmenistan.

The larvae have been recorded feeding on Ephedra distachya.
