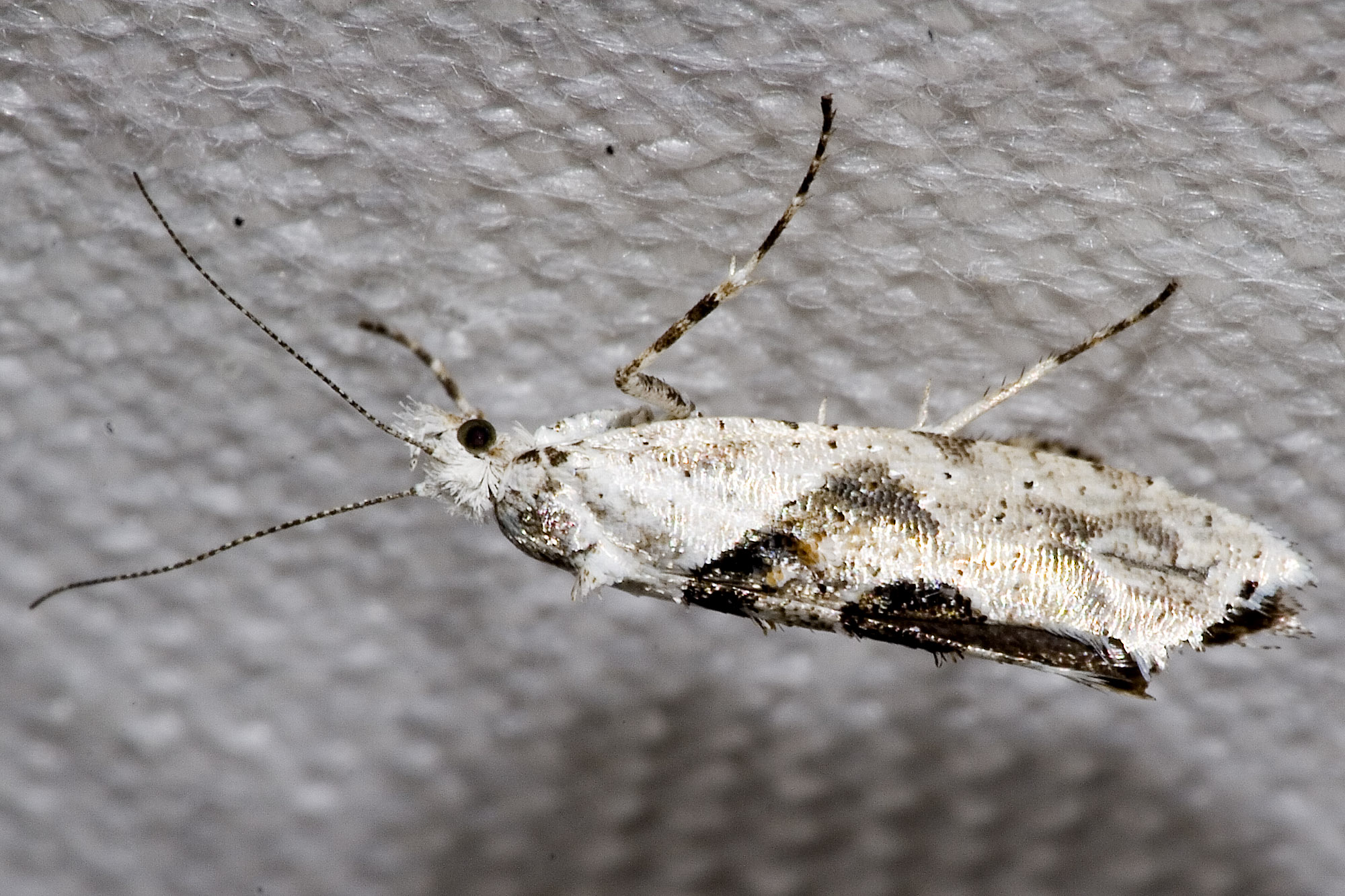
- Ypsolopha asperella

Scientific classification
- Domain: Eukaryota
- Kingdom: Animalia
- Phylum: Arthropoda
- Class: Insecta
- Order: Lepidoptera
- Family: Ypsolophidae
- Subfamily: Ypsolophinae
- Genus: Ypsolopha; Latreille, 1796

Type species
- Phalaena sylvella Linnaeus, 1767

Synonyms
- List: Ypsolophus Fabricius, 1798 (Unjustified emendation of Ypsolopha); Hypsolophus Illiger, 1801 (Unjustified emendation of Ypsolophus); Cerostoma Latreille, [1802]; Ypsilophus Oken, 1815 (Unjustified emendation of Ypsolophus); Hypsolopha Billberg, 1820 (Unjustified emendation of Ypsolopha); Theristis Hübner, [1825]; Harpipterix Hübner, [1825]; Abebaea Hübner, [1825]; Theristes; Hübner, [1826] (Incorrect subsequent spelling of Theristis); Chaetochilus Stephens, 1834; Harpipteryx; Stephens, 1834 (Incorrect subsequent spelling of Harpipterix); Harpepteryx Sodoffsky, 1837 (Unjustified emendation of Harpipterix); Pteroxia Guenée, 1845; Hypolepia Guenée, 1845; Harpopteryx; Agassiz, 1847 (Incorrect subsequent spelling of Harpipterix); Hypsilophus Agassiz, 1847 (Unjustified emendation of Ypsolophus and junior homonym of Hypsilophus Wagler, 1830); Credemnon Wallengren, 1880; Periclymenobius Wallengren, 1880; Trachoma Wallengren, 1880; Pluteloptera Chambers, 1880; Plutelloptera; Chambers, 1880 (Incorrect subsequent spelling of Pluteloptera); Mapa Strand, 1911; Pycnopogon Chrétien, 1922 (Junior homonym of Pycnopogon Loew, 1847); Credemna; Forbes, 1923 (Incorrect subsequent spelling of Credemnon); Melitonympha Meyrick, 1927; Chalconympha Meyrick, 1931; Credemon; Moriuti, 1977 (Incorrect subsequent spelling of Credemnon)

= Ypsolopha =

Genus of moths

Ypsolopha is a genus of moths of the family Ypsolophidae. It is the type genus of the family and comprises over 120 described species (about 95% of the family's known world diversity).

== Distribution ==
Most Ypsolopha species have been recorded from the Holarctic temperate region.

== Description ==
Ypsolopha species are variable in shape and color and no exclusive superficial features have been established for the group. In contrast, the genitalia of both sexes are remarkably homogeneous.

== Biology ==
Adults are nocturnal or rarely diurnal. Their resting postures are various, but they often have the head down and the lower body up. Ypsolopha acuminata mimics a small broken branch at rest. The larvae usually live in open webs on the leaves of various, primarily woody, plants and mostly feed on a limited range of host plants. They are active primarily at night and have two defensive behaviors that involve wiggling and jumping.

== Selected species ==
- Ypsolopha acerella Ponomarenko, Sohn & Zinchenko, 2011
- Ypsolopha acuminata (Butler, 1878)
- Ypsolopha albiramella (Mann, 1861)
- Ypsolopha albistriatus (Issiki, 1930)
- Ypsolopha aleutianella (Beutenmüller, 1889)
- Ypsolopha alpella (Denis & Schiffermüller, 1775)
- Ypsolopha amoenella (Christoph, 1882)
- Ypsolopha angelicella (Busck, 1903)
- Ypsolopha arizonella (Busck, 1903)
- Ypsolopha asperella (Linnaeus, 1761)
- Ypsolopha atrobrunnella Ponomarenko & Sohn, 2011
- Ypsolopha aurata Moriuti, 1977
- Ypsolopha barberella (Busck, 1903)
- Ypsolopha blandella (Christoph, 1882)
- Ypsolopha buscki Heppner, 1982
- Ypsolopha cajaliella Vives, 2003
- Ypsolopha canariella (Walsingham, 1881)
- Ypsolopha cervella (Walsingham, 1881)
- Ypsolopha chazariella (Mann, 1866)
- Ypsolopha cockerella (Busck, 1903)
- Ypsolopha colleaguella Baraniak, 2007
- Ypsolopha contractella (Caradja, 1920)
- Ypsolopha coriacella (Herrich-Schäffer, 1855)
- Ypsolopha costibasella (Caradja, 1939)
- Ypsolopha cristata Moriuti, 1977
- Ypsolopha delicatella (Busck, 1903)
- Ypsolopha dentella (Fabricius, 1775)
- Ypsolopha dentiferella (Walsingham, 1881)
- Ypsolopha diana (Caradja, 1939)
- Ypsolopha distinctatus Moriuti, 1977
- Ypsolopha divisella (Chrétien, 1915)
- Ypsolopha dorsimaculella (Kearfott, 1907)
- Ypsolopha electropa (Meyrick, 1914)
- Ypsolopha elongata (Braun, 1925)
- Ypsolopha ephedrella (Christoph, 1873)
- Ypsolopha excisella (Lederer, 1855)
- Ypsolopha exsularis (Meyrick, 1937)
- Ypsolopha falcella (Denis & Schiffermüller, 1775)
- Ypsolopha falciferella (Walsingham, 1881)
- Ypsolopha flavistrigella (Busck, 1906)
- Ypsolopha flava (Issiki, 1930)
- Ypsolopha fractella (Chrétien, 1915)
- Ypsolopha frustella (Walsingham, 1881)
- Ypsolopha fujimotoi Moriuti, 1964
- Ypsolopha gerdanella (Busck, 1903)
- Ypsolopha helva J.C. Sohn & C.S. Wu, in Sohn et al., 2010
- Ypsolopha heteraula (Meyrick, 1927)
- Ypsolopha horridella (Tritschke, 1835)
- Ypsolopha indecorella (Rebel, 1903)
- Ypsolopha instabilella (Mann, 1866)
- Ypsolopha japonica Moriuti, 1964
- Ypsolopha kristalleniae Rebel, 1916
- Ypsolopha leptaula (Meyrick, 1927)
- Ypsolopha leuconotella (Snellen, 1884)
- Ypsolopha lonicerella Stökl, 1922
- Ypsolopha longa Moriuti, 1964
- Ypsolopha lucella (Fabricius, 1775)
- Ypsolopha lutisplendida Sohn & Wu, 2011
- Ypsolopha lyonothamnae (Powell, 1967)
- Ypsolopha maculatella (Busck, 1906)
- Ypsolopha manella (Busck, 1903)
- Ypsolopha manniella (Staudinger, 1880)
- Ypsolopha melanocnista (Meyrick, 1938)
- Ypsolopha melanofuscella Ponomarenko & Zinchenko, 2013
- Ypsolopha mienshani (Caradja, 1939)
- Ypsolopha minotaurella (Rebel, 1916)
- Ypsolopha mucronella (Scopoli, 1763)
- Ypsolopha nebulella (Staudinger, 1871)
- Ypsolopha nella (Busck, 1903)
- Ypsolopha nemorella (Linnaeus, 1758)
- Ypsolopha nigrimaculata Byun et Park, 2001
- Ypsolopha nigrofasciata Yang, 1977
- Ypsolopha oliviella (Busck, 1903)
- Ypsolopha parallela (Caradja, 1939)
- Ypsolopha parenthesella (Linnaeus, 1761)
- Ypsolopha parodaula (Meyrick, 1938)
- Ypsolopha persicella (Fabricius, 1787)
- Ypsolopha pseudoparallela J.C. Sohn & C.S. Wu, in Sohn et al., 2010
- Ypsolopha querciella (Busck, 1903)
- Ypsolopha rubrella (Dyar, 1902)
- Ypsolopha rhytidota (Meyrick, 1938)
- Ypsolopha saitoi Moriuti, 1964
- Ypsolopha sarmaticella (Rebel, 1917)
- Ypsolopha sasayamanus (Matsumura, 1931)
- Ypsolopha satellitella (Staudinger, 1871)
- Ypsolopha scabrella (Linnaeus, 1761)
- Ypsolopha schwarziella (Busck, 1903)
- Ypsolopha sculpturella (Herrich-Schäffer, 1854)
- Ypsolopha semitessella (Mann, 1861)
- Ypsolopha senex (Walsingham, 1889)
- Ypsolopha seniculella (Christoph, 1872)
- Ypsolopha sequella (Clerck, 1759)
- Ypsolopha sordida J.C. Sohn & C.S. Wu, in Sohn et al., 2010
- Ypsolopha straminella Ponomarenko & Zinchenko, 2013
- Ypsolopha striatella (Busck, 1903)
- Ypsolopha strigosus (Butler, 1879)
- Ypsolopha sublucella (Walsingham, 1881)
- Ypsolopha sylvella (Linnaeus, 1767)
- Ypsolopha tesselatidorsata Ponomarenko & Zinchenko, 2011
- Ypsolopha trichonella (Mann, 1861)
- Ypsolopha tsugae Moriuti, 1977
- Ypsolopha undulatella (Busck, 1906)
- Ypsolopha unicipunctella (Busck, 1903)
- Ypsolopha uniformis (Filipjev, 1929)
- Ypsolopha ustella (Clerck, 1759)
- Ypsolopha vintrella (Busck, 1906)
- Ypsolopha vittella (Linnaeus, 1758)
- Ypsolopha walsinghamiella (Busck, 1903)
- Ypsolopha yangi Ponomerenko & Sohn, 2011
- Ypsolopha yasudai Moriuti, 1964

== Former species ==
- Ypsolopha scenites (Meyrick, 1909)
