= Ypsolopha instabilella =

Scientific classification
- Kingdom: Animalia
- Phylum: Arthropoda
- Clade: Pancrustacea
- Class: Insecta
- Order: Lepidoptera
- Family: Ypsolophidae
- Genus: Ypsolopha
- Species: Y. instabilella

Binomial name
- Ypsolopha instabilella (Mann, 1866)

Synonyms
- Cerostoma instabilella Mann, 1866

Species of moth

Ypsolopha instabilella is a moth of the family Ypsolophidae. It is found in Uzbekistan, Tajikistan, Kyrgyzstan, Asia Minor and in the southern part of eastern Europe. It can often be found by open sources of light

The larvae feed on Ephedra species, including Ephedra distachya.
