= Ypsolopha japonica =

Scientific classification
- Kingdom: Animalia
- Phylum: Arthropoda
- Class: Insecta
- Order: Lepidoptera
- Family: Ypsolophidae
- Genus: Ypsolopha
- Species: Y. japonica

Binomial name
- Ypsolopha japonica Moriuti, 1964

Synonyms
- Ypsolopha japonicus

Species of moth

Ypsolopha japonica is a moth of the family Ypsolophidae. It is known from Japan, Korea, China and Russia.

The wingspan is about 25 mm.
