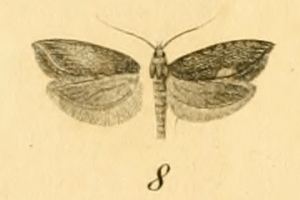

Scientific classification
- Domain: Eukaryota
- Kingdom: Animalia
- Phylum: Arthropoda
- Class: Insecta
- Order: Lepidoptera
- Family: Ypsolophidae
- Genus: Ypsolopha
- Species: Y. chazariella

Binomial name
- Ypsolopha chazariella (Mann, 1866)

Synonyms
- Cerostoma chazariella Mann, 1866

= Ypsolopha chazariella =

Species of moth

Ypsolopha chazariella is a moth of the family Ypsolophidae. It is known from Latvia, Lithuania, the Czech Republic, Slovakia, Albania, Bosnia and Herzegovina, Hungary, Bulgaria, Romania and France. It has also been recorded from Finland, and it is thought that it was introduced to northern Europe with its food plant, which is a common decorative plant in Europe.

The larvae feed on Acer tataricum. Larvae can be found from late May to the middle of June.
