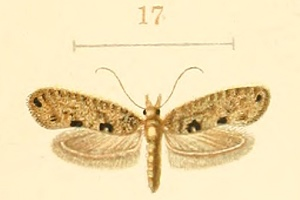

Scientific classification
- Domain: Eukaryota
- Kingdom: Animalia
- Phylum: Arthropoda
- Class: Insecta
- Order: Lepidoptera
- Family: Ypsolophidae
- Genus: Ypsolopha
- Species: Y. minotaurella

Binomial name
- Ypsolopha minotaurella (Rebel, 1916)

Synonyms
- Cerostoma minotaurella Rebel, 1916

= Ypsolopha minotaurella =

Species of moth

Ypsolopha minotaurella is a moth of the family Ypsolophidae. It is known from Albania, Greece and Crete.

The wingspan is 17–18 mm.
