= Ypsolopha cristata =

Scientific classification
- Kingdom: Animalia
- Phylum: Arthropoda
- Class: Insecta
- Order: Lepidoptera
- Family: Ypsolophidae
- Genus: Ypsolopha
- Species: Y. cristata

Binomial name
- Ypsolopha cristata Moriuti, 1977

Synonyms
- Ypsolopha cristatus

Species of moth

Ypsolopha cristata is a moth of the family Ypsolophidae. It is known from Japan, Korea, north-eastern China and Russia.

The wingspan is 22–23 mm.
