= Ypsolopha maculatella =

Scientific classification
- Kingdom: Animalia
- Phylum: Arthropoda
- Class: Insecta
- Order: Lepidoptera
- Family: Ypsolophidae
- Genus: Ypsolopha
- Species: Y. maculatella

Binomial name
- Ypsolopha maculatella (Busck, 1906)

Synonyms
- Cerostoma maculatella Busck, 1906

Species of moth

Ypsolopha maculatella is a moth of the family Ypsolophidae. It is known from the United States, including Arizona and California.

The wingspan is about 20–22 mm.

The antennae are white, sharply annulated with dark brown except on the basal fourth. The labial palpi are white. The face is also white and the head and thorax are ochreous white. The forewings are ochreous white, while the basal half of the costal edge is ochreous fuscous. From the base runs a broad, dark, ochreous fuscous band outwards below the fold, touching the dorsal edge and then curving upwards to the fold. At the end of the cell is a large, oblong, pronounced, dark fuscous spot, produced into a still larger paler ochreous patch, which covers most of the apical third of the wing and emits three dark fingers to the costal edge. The hindwings are paler fuscous. The abdomen is ochreous white and the legs are white, mottled with black exteriorly.
