= Ypsolopha longa =

Scientific classification
- Kingdom: Animalia
- Phylum: Arthropoda
- Class: Insecta
- Order: Lepidoptera
- Family: Ypsolophidae
- Genus: Ypsolopha
- Species: Y. longa

Binomial name
- Ypsolopha longa Moriuti, 1964

Synonyms
- Ypsolopha longus

Species of moth

Ypsolopha longa is a moth of the family Ypsolophidae. It is known from Japan, Korea and Russia.

The wingspan is 22–31 mm.

The larvae feed on Euonymus maackii and Euonymus sieboldianus.
