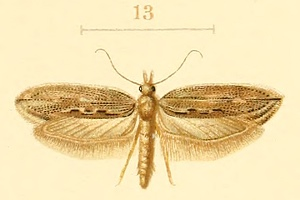

Scientific classification
- Domain: Eukaryota
- Kingdom: Animalia
- Phylum: Arthropoda
- Class: Insecta
- Order: Lepidoptera
- Family: Ypsolophidae
- Genus: Ypsolopha
- Species: Y. kristalleniae

Binomial name
- Ypsolopha kristalleniae Rebel, 1916

= Ypsolopha kristalleniae =

Species of moth

Ypsolopha kristalleniae is a moth of the family Ypsolophidae. It is known from Crete and Turkey.

The wingspan is about 19 mm.
