= Ypsolopha electropa =

Scientific classification
- Kingdom: Animalia
- Phylum: Arthropoda
- Class: Insecta
- Order: Lepidoptera
- Family: Ypsolophidae
- Genus: Ypsolopha
- Species: Y. electropa

Binomial name
- Ypsolopha electropa (Meyrick, 1914)

Synonyms
- Cerostoma electropa Meyrick, 1914

Species of moth

Ypsolopha electropa is a moth of the family Ypsolophidae. It is known from North America.
