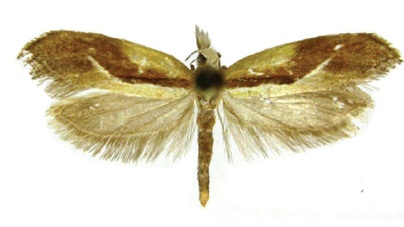

Scientific classification
- Domain: Eukaryota
- Kingdom: Animalia
- Phylum: Arthropoda
- Class: Insecta
- Order: Lepidoptera
- Family: Ypsolophidae
- Genus: Ypsolopha
- Species: Y. costibasella

Binomial name
- Ypsolopha costibasella (Caradja, 1939)

Synonyms
- Cerostoma costibasella Caradja, 1939; Ypsolophus ulingensis Yang, 1977

= Ypsolopha costibasella =

Species of moth

Ypsolopha costibasella is a moth of the family Ypsolophidae. It is found in the Russian Far East and in China (Beijing, Hebei, Shanxi).
