= Ypsolopha undulatella =

Scientific classification
- Domain: Eukaryota
- Kingdom: Animalia
- Phylum: Arthropoda
- Class: Insecta
- Order: Lepidoptera
- Family: Ypsolophidae
- Genus: Ypsolopha
- Species: Y. undulatella

Binomial name
- Ypsolopha undulatella (Busck, 1906)

Synonyms
- Cerostoma undulatella Busck, 1906

Species of moth

Ypsolopha undulatella is a moth of the family Ypsolophidae. It is known from the United States, including Arizona, Utah and Colorado.

The wingspan is about 20–24 mm.

The antennae are light fuscous with indistinct darker annulations. The labial palpi are white, dusted with black. The face, head and thorax are bluish white minutely dusted with black atoms, each scale being white with dark lines. The forewings are bluish silvery white, densely overlaid with black and brown in ill-defined wavy transverse lines. Each white scale is tipped with black. The apical part of the wing is strongly cupreous brown, especially around the edge. The hindwings are light fuscous, the abdomen is silvery fuscous and the legs are white dusted with black.
