= Ypsolopha cervella =

Scientific classification
- Kingdom: Animalia
- Phylum: Arthropoda
- Clade: Pancrustacea
- Class: Insecta
- Order: Lepidoptera
- Family: Ypsolophidae
- Genus: Ypsolopha
- Species: Y. cervella

Binomial name
- Ypsolopha cervella (Walsingham, 1881)

Synonyms
- Cerostoma cervella Walsingham, 1881; Abebaea cervella; Cerostoma subsylvella Walsingham, 1889; Abebaea subsylvella

Species of moth

Ypsolopha cervella is a moth of the family Ypsolophidae. It is found from Vancouver Island southward along the Pacific coast to San Diego County in California and inland to Arizona.

The wingspan is about 19 mm. There is one generation per year, with adults emerging in June. Adults are polymorphic.

The larvae feed on oaks of the sections Erythrobalanus (red oak) and Lepidobalanus (white oak), including Quercus chrysolepis and Quercus gambelii.
