= Ypsolopha aurata =

Scientific classification
- Kingdom: Animalia
- Phylum: Arthropoda
- Class: Insecta
- Order: Lepidoptera
- Family: Ypsolophidae
- Genus: Ypsolopha
- Species: Y. aurata

Binomial name
- Ypsolopha aurata Moriuti, 1977

Synonyms
- Ypsolopha auratus

Species of moth

Ypsolopha aurata is a moth of the family Ypsolophidae. It is known from Japan.

The wingspan is 16–17 mm.
