= Ypsolopha coriacella =

Scientific classification
- Domain: Eukaryota
- Kingdom: Animalia
- Phylum: Arthropoda
- Class: Insecta
- Order: Lepidoptera
- Family: Ypsolophidae
- Genus: Ypsolopha
- Species: Y. coriacella

Binomial name
- Ypsolopha coriacella (Herrich-Schäffer, 1855)

Synonyms
- Rhinosia coriacella Herrich-Schäffer, 1855

Species of moth

Ypsolopha coriacella is a moth of the family Ypsolophidae. It is known from Germany, Poland, Austria, Switzerland, Slovakia, the Czech Republic and Russia.

The larvae feed on Abies species. However, the species occurs in the regions with nowadays' absence of the fir, as well. For instance, it has been found just a little to the north-west of Yaroslavl, some 150 km westwards from the most extreme western distribution edge of the fir.
