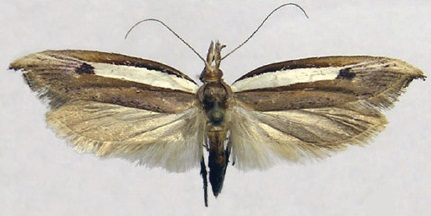

Scientific classification
- Kingdom: Animalia
- Phylum: Arthropoda
- Clade: Pancrustacea
- Class: Insecta
- Order: Lepidoptera
- Family: Ypsolophidae
- Genus: Ypsolopha
- Species: Y. nigrimaculata

Binomial name
- Ypsolopha nigrimaculata Byun et Park, 2001

= Ypsolopha nigrimaculata =

Species of moth

Ypsolopha nigrimaculata is a moth of the family Ypsolophidae. It is known from Korea and the Russian Far East.

The length of the forewings is about 11 mm.
