= Ypsolopha rhytidota =

Scientific classification
- Kingdom: Animalia
- Phylum: Arthropoda
- Class: Insecta
- Order: Lepidoptera
- Family: Ypsolophidae
- Genus: Ypsolopha
- Species: Y. rhytidota

Binomial name
- Ypsolopha rhytidota (Meyrick, 1938)

Synonyms
- Ypsolophus rhytidota Meyrick, 1938

Species of moth

Ypsolopha rhytidota is a moth of the family Ypsolophidae. It is known from Yunnan in China.
