= Ypsolopha querciella =

Scientific classification
- Domain: Eukaryota
- Kingdom: Animalia
- Phylum: Arthropoda
- Class: Insecta
- Order: Lepidoptera
- Family: Ypsolophidae
- Genus: Ypsolopha
- Species: Y. querciella

Binomial name
- Ypsolopha querciella (Busck, 1903)

Synonyms
- Abebaea querciella Busck, 1903

Species of moth

Ypsolopha querciella is a moth of the family Ypsolophidae. It is known from the United States, including Arizona and Utah.

The wingspan is about 17 mm.

The antennae are white with black annulations. The labial palpi are light brown on the outside and whitish on the inside. The tuft is longer than the terminal joint, which is white. The face and head are canary yellow and the thorax is light reddish brown. The forewings are light golden brown and lightest and more yellowish along the costal edge and with strong silvery and greenish reflections. On the dorsal edge are two faint parallel outwardly oblique darker brown streaks, one at basal third and one at the middle of the wing, reaching beyond the fold and two other subobsolete streaks perpendicular to these, all together forming a faint inverted open W. The hindwings are light ochreous fuscous and the legs and underside of the body are golden white.

The larvae feed on Quercus species.
