= Ypsolopha melanocnista =

Scientific classification
- Kingdom: Animalia
- Phylum: Arthropoda
- Class: Insecta
- Order: Lepidoptera
- Family: Ypsolophidae
- Genus: Ypsolopha
- Species: Y. melanocnista

Binomial name
- Ypsolopha melanocnista (Meyrick, 1938)

Synonyms
- Ypsolophus melanocnista Meyrick, 1938

Species of moth

Ypsolopha melanocnista is a moth of the family Ypsolophidae. It is known from Yunnan in China.
