= Ypsolopha arizonella =

Scientific classification
- Domain: Eukaryota
- Kingdom: Animalia
- Phylum: Arthropoda
- Class: Insecta
- Order: Lepidoptera
- Family: Ypsolophidae
- Genus: Ypsolopha
- Species: Y. arizonella

Binomial name
- Ypsolopha arizonella (Busck, 1903)

Synonyms
- Cerostoma arizonella Busck, 1903

Species of moth

Ypsolopha arizonella is a moth of the family Ypsolophidae. It is known from the United States, including Arizona.

The wingspan is about 22 mm.

The antennae are dark brown. The labial palpi are light brown on the inside and strongly mottled with blackish scales on the outside. The tuft on the second joint is small, while the terminal joint is thickened with rough scales anteriorly. The head and thorax are light ochreous brown. The ground color of the forewings is rather light brown, but thickly overlaid on the costal three fourths with deep brown and dark purple scales, obscuring the ground color except along the dorsal edge. The hindwings are silvery fuscous and the legs are dark purplish fuscous.
