= Ypsolopha pseudoparallela =

Scientific classification
- Kingdom: Animalia
- Phylum: Arthropoda
- Clade: Pancrustacea
- Class: Insecta
- Order: Lepidoptera
- Family: Ypsolophidae
- Genus: Ypsolopha
- Species: Y. pseudoparallela

Binomial name
- Ypsolopha pseudoparallela J.C. Sohn & C.S. Wu, in Sohn et al., 2010

Species of moth

Ypsolopha pseudoparallela is a moth of the family Ypsolophidae. It is known from Honshu island in Japan.

The length of the forewings is 8.8-10.1 mm.
