= Ypsolopha gerdanella =

Scientific classification
- Kingdom: Animalia
- Phylum: Arthropoda
- Class: Insecta
- Order: Lepidoptera
- Family: Ypsolophidae
- Genus: Ypsolopha
- Species: Y. gerdanella

Binomial name
- Ypsolopha gerdanella (Dyar, 1903)

Synonyms
- Abebaea gerdanella Dyar, 1903

Species of moth

Ypsolopha gerdanella is a moth of the family Ypsolophidae. It is known from the United States, including New Mexico.

The wingspan is about 18 mm.

The antennae are white, dotted with black scales above. The labial palpi are white, sprinkled with sparse black scales on the outside. The tuft on the second joint is longer than the terminal joint. The face, head and thorax are white and the shoulders yellowish. The forewings are light golden brown with white and black markings. There is a broad white streak in the middle of the wing running from the base to the apex. It is slightly edged with black on both sides from the base to end of cell, there it broadens out gradually and covers the entire apical part of the wing, but is obscured by longitudinal black streaks covering the intervals between the apical veins and leaving the veins indicated by narrow white lines. Extreme costal edge is slightly touched with black and the basal part of dorsal edge is whitish. The hindwings are light silky ochreous and the legs and underside of the body are white, sparsely mottled with single black scales.
