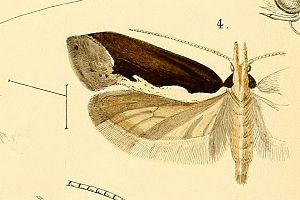

Scientific classification
- Kingdom: Animalia
- Phylum: Arthropoda
- Class: Insecta
- Order: Lepidoptera
- Family: Ypsolophidae
- Genus: Ypsolopha
- Species: Y. leuconotella

Binomial name
- Ypsolopha leuconotella (Snellen, 1884)

Synonyms
- Cerostoma leuconotella Snellen, 1884; Ypsolophus hebeiensis Yang, 1977

= Ypsolopha leuconotella =

Species of moth

Ypsolopha leuconotella is a moth of the family Ypsolophidae. It is found from Slovakia, Hungary and Romania east to Russia (South Siberian Mountains and the Amur and Primorye Regions), Kazakhstan, Japan and China.

The wingspan is 11–18 mm.
