= Ypsolopha yasudai =

Scientific classification
- Domain: Eukaryota
- Kingdom: Animalia
- Phylum: Arthropoda
- Class: Insecta
- Order: Lepidoptera
- Family: Ypsolophidae
- Genus: Ypsolopha
- Species: Y. yasudai

Binomial name
- Ypsolopha yasudai Moriutu, 1964

Species of moth

Ypsolopha yasudai is a moth of the family Ypsolophidae. It is known from Japan, Korea, north-eastern and central China and Russia.

The wingspan is 17–18 mm.
