= Ypsolopha sasayamana =

Scientific classification
- Kingdom: Animalia
- Phylum: Arthropoda
- Clade: Pancrustacea
- Class: Insecta
- Order: Lepidoptera
- Family: Ypsolophidae
- Genus: Ypsolopha
- Species: Y. sasayamana

Binomial name
- Ypsolopha sasayamana (Matsumura, 1931)

Synonyms
- Ypsolopha sasayamanus

Species of moth

Ypsolopha sasayamana is a moth of the family Ypsolophidae. It has been found in Japan.
