= Ypsolopha divisella =

Scientific classification
- Domain: Eukaryota
- Kingdom: Animalia
- Phylum: Arthropoda
- Class: Insecta
- Order: Lepidoptera
- Family: Ypsolophidae
- Genus: Ypsolopha
- Species: Y. divisella

Binomial name
- Ypsolopha divisella (Chrétien, 1915)

Synonyms
- Cerostoma divisella Chrétien, 1915

Species of moth

Ypsolopha divisella is a moth of the family Ypsolophidae. It is from France.

The wingspan is 16–17 mm.

The larvae feed Ephedra altissima
