= Ypsolopha lyonothamnae =

Scientific classification
- Kingdom: Animalia
- Phylum: Arthropoda
- Clade: Pancrustacea
- Class: Insecta
- Order: Lepidoptera
- Family: Ypsolophidae
- Genus: Ypsolopha
- Species: Y. lyonothamnae

Binomial name
- Ypsolopha lyonothamnae (Powell, 1967)

Synonyms
- Cerostoma lyonothamnae Powell, 1967

Species of moth

Ypsolopha lyonothamnae is a moth of the family Ypsolophidae. It is known from the Channel Islands of California in the United States.

The larvae feed on Lyonothamnus species.
