= Ypsolopha vintrella =

Scientific classification
- Kingdom: Animalia
- Phylum: Arthropoda
- Class: Insecta
- Order: Lepidoptera
- Family: Ypsolophidae
- Genus: Ypsolopha
- Species: Y. vintrella

Binomial name
- Ypsolopha vintrella (Busck, 1906)

Synonyms
- Cerostoma vintrella Busck, 1906

Species of moth

Ypsolopha vintrella is a moth of the family Ypsolophidae. It is known from the United States, including Arizona and California.

The wingspan is about 17–22 mm.

The antennae are white with sharp prominent dark brown annulations. The labial palpi are white and the face, head and thorax are pure white. The forewings are white with indistinct and ill-defined, light ochreous fuscous markings, the most persistent of these are a central longitudinal row of three large oblong spots, more or less connected by single dark scales, and a series of equidistant costal, apical and dorsal spots around the edge of the apical third of the wing. There are also two ochreous fuscous costal spots, one at basal third and one at the middle of the wing, and two or more dorsal spots, but none of these markings are very constant. The hindwings are light gray, the abdomen is dark fuscous and the legs are white.
