= Ypsolopha contractella =

Scientific classification
- Kingdom: Animalia
- Phylum: Arthropoda
- Class: Insecta
- Order: Lepidoptera
- Family: Ypsolophidae
- Genus: Ypsolopha
- Species: Y. contractella

Binomial name
- Ypsolopha contractella (Caradja, 1920)

Synonyms
- Cerostoma contractella Caradja, 1920

Species of moth

Ypsolopha contractella is a moth of the family Ypsolophidae. It is known from Japan (the islands of Hokkaido and Honshu), Korea, north-eastern China and the Russian Far East.

The length of the forewings is 7.3-11.2 mm.
