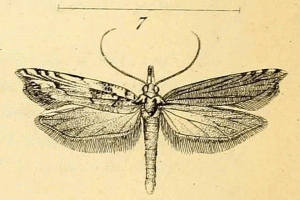

Scientific classification
- Domain: Eukaryota
- Kingdom: Animalia
- Phylum: Arthropoda
- Class: Insecta
- Order: Lepidoptera
- Family: Ypsolophidae
- Genus: Ypsolopha
- Species: Y. excisella

Binomial name
- Ypsolopha excisella (Lederer, 1855)

Synonyms
- Plutella excisella Lederer, 1855

= Ypsolopha excisella =

Species of moth

Ypsolopha excisella is a moth of the family Ypsolophidae. It is known from Spain, but has also been recorded from Mongolia and Asia Minor.
