= Ypsolopha sordida =

Scientific classification
- Kingdom: Animalia
- Phylum: Arthropoda
- Clade: Pancrustacea
- Class: Insecta
- Order: Lepidoptera
- Family: Ypsolophidae
- Genus: Ypsolopha
- Species: Y. sordida

Binomial name
- Ypsolopha sordida J.C. Sohn & C.S. Wu, in Sohn et al., 2010

Species of moth

Ypsolopha sordida is a moth of the family Ypsolophidae. It is known from southern China.

The length of the forewings is 10.8 mm.
