= Ypsolopha yangi =

Scientific classification
- Kingdom: Animalia
- Phylum: Arthropoda
- Class: Insecta
- Order: Lepidoptera
- Family: Ypsolophidae
- Genus: Ypsolopha
- Species: Y. yangi

Binomial name
- Ypsolopha yangi Ponomarenko & Sohn, 2011

Species of moth

Ypsolopha yangi is a moth of the family Ypsolophidae. It is known from the Russian Far East and northern and south-western China.

The length of the forewings is 7–9 mm.
