= Ypsolopha flava =

Scientific classification
- Kingdom: Animalia
- Phylum: Arthropoda
- Class: Insecta
- Order: Lepidoptera
- Family: Ypsolophidae
- Genus: Ypsolopha
- Species: Y. flava

Binomial name
- Ypsolopha flava (Issiki, 1930)

Synonyms
- Ypsolopha flavus

Species of moth

Ypsolopha flava is a moth of the family Ypsolophidae. It is known from Japan.

The wingspan is 19–20 mm.
