= Ypsolopha diana =

Scientific classification
- Domain: Eukaryota
- Kingdom: Animalia
- Phylum: Arthropoda
- Class: Insecta
- Order: Lepidoptera
- Family: Ypsolophidae
- Genus: Ypsolopha
- Species: Y. diana

Binomial name
- Ypsolopha diana (Caradja, 1939)

Synonyms
- Cerostoma diana Caradja, 1939

Species of moth

Ypsolopha diana is a moth of the family Ypsolophidae. It is known from China.
