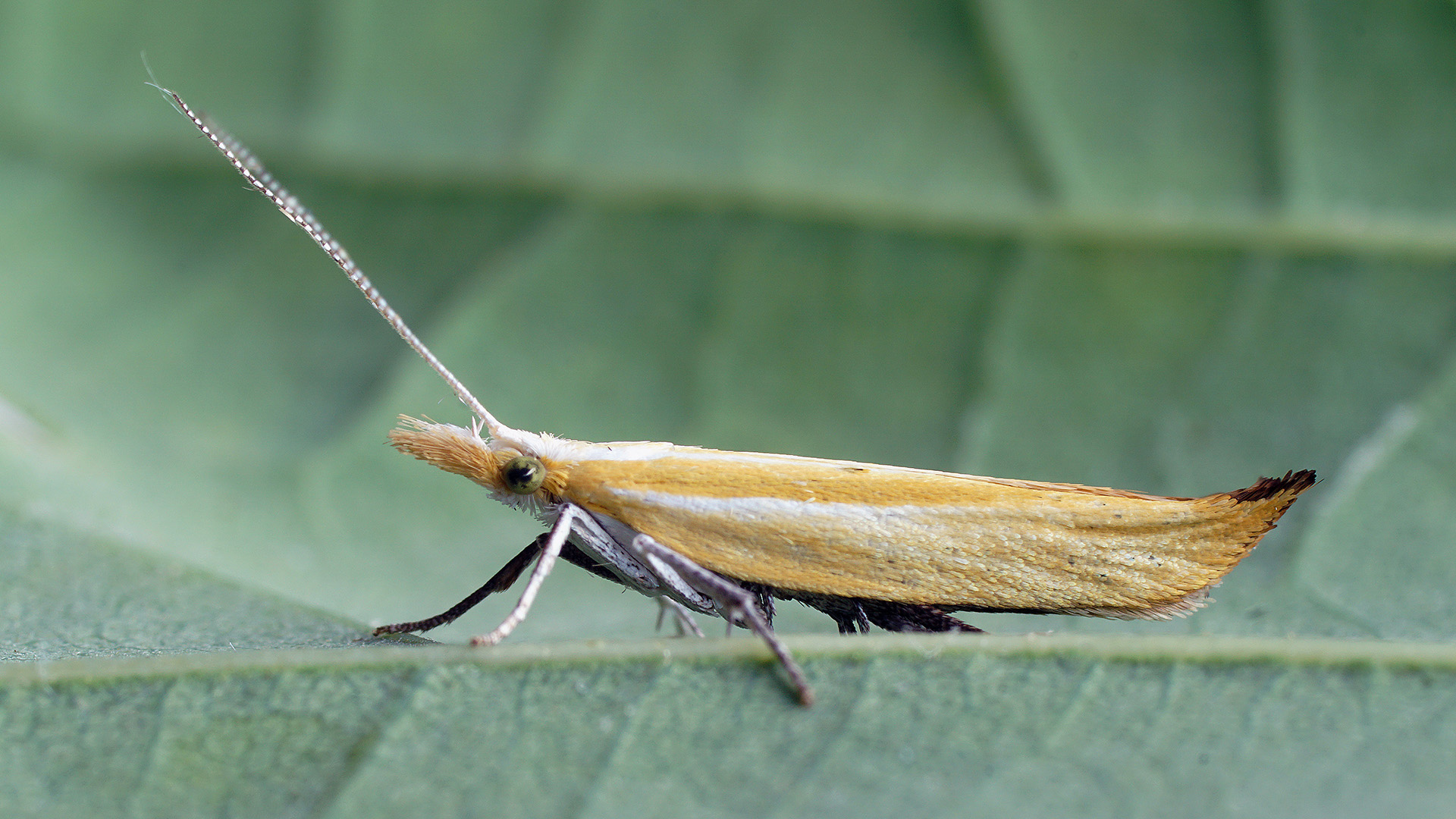

Scientific classification
- Domain: Eukaryota
- Kingdom: Animalia
- Phylum: Arthropoda
- Class: Insecta
- Order: Lepidoptera
- Family: Ypsolophidae
- Genus: Ypsolopha
- Species: Y. blandella

Binomial name
- Ypsolopha blandella (Christoph, 1882)

Synonyms
- Cerostoma blandella Christoph, 1882; Ypsolopha blandellus

= Ypsolopha blandella =

Species of moth

Ypsolopha blandella is a moth of the family Ypsolophidae. It has been recorded from Amur Oblast in Russia, and from Estonia, Latvia, Spain, Japan, Korea and China.

The wingspan is 20–22 mm.
