= Ypsolopha colleaguella =

Scientific classification
- Domain: Eukaryota
- Kingdom: Animalia
- Phylum: Arthropoda
- Class: Insecta
- Order: Lepidoptera
- Family: Ypsolophidae
- Genus: Ypsolopha
- Species: Y. colleaguella

Binomial name
- Ypsolopha colleaguella Baraniak, 2007

Species of moth

Ypsolopha colleaguella is a moth of the family Ypsolophidae. It is known from the Volga River valley in southern Russia and Kazakhstan (the area of the lower Irtysz River near the Chinese border).

The wingspan is 17.5–19.5 mm.

== Etymology ==
The name is a dedication to the friends of the author who helped in his work on Ypsolophidae.
