= Ypsolopha schwarziella =

Scientific classification
- Kingdom: Animalia
- Phylum: Arthropoda
- Class: Insecta
- Order: Lepidoptera
- Family: Ypsolophidae
- Genus: Ypsolopha
- Species: Y. schwarziella

Binomial name
- Ypsolopha schwarziella (Dyar, 1903)

Synonyms
- Cerostoma schwarziella Dyar, 1903

Species of moth

Ypsolopha schwarziella is a moth of the family Ypsolophidae. It is known from the United States, including Arizona, Utah and California.

The wingspan is about 23 mm (0.91 in).

The antennae are dark fuscous. The labial palpi are clothed with blackish-brown light tipped scales on the outside and with light ochreous scales on the inside. The tuft is short and the terminal joint is thickened with rough scales in front. The head and thorax are light brown, although the shoulders are slightly darker and purplish-brown. The forewings are light brown, sparsely sprinkled with dark fuscous scales. The hindwings are silvery fuscous, but blackish toward the apex. The legs are ochreous, mottled with black and the abdomen is ochreous, sprinkled with black.
