= Ypsolopha tsugae =

Scientific classification
- Kingdom: Animalia
- Phylum: Arthropoda
- Class: Insecta
- Order: Lepidoptera
- Family: Ypsolophidae
- Genus: Ypsolopha
- Species: Y. tsugae

Binomial name
- Ypsolopha tsugae Moriuti, 1977

Species of moth

Ypsolopha tsugae is a moth of the family Ypsolophidae. It is known from Japan and Russia.

The wingspan is 10–11 mm.

The larvae feed on Tsuga diversifolia and Abies sachalinensis.
