= Ypsolopha tesselatidorsata =

Scientific classification
- Kingdom: Animalia
- Phylum: Arthropoda
- Class: Insecta
- Order: Lepidoptera
- Family: Ypsolophidae
- Genus: Ypsolopha
- Species: Y. tesselatidorsata

Binomial name
- Ypsolopha tesselatidorsata Ponomarenko & Sohn, 2011

Species of moth

Ypsolopha tesselatidorsata is a moth of the family Ypsolophidae. It is known from the Russian Far East.

The length of the forewings is 6.8–7.8 mm.
