= Ypsolopha leptaula =

Scientific classification
- Kingdom: Animalia
- Phylum: Arthropoda
- Class: Insecta
- Order: Lepidoptera
- Family: Ypsolophidae
- Genus: Ypsolopha
- Species: Y. leptaula

Binomial name
- Ypsolopha leptaula (Meyrick, 1927)

Synonyms
- Cerostoma leptaula Meyrick, 1927

Species of moth

Ypsolopha leptaula is a moth in the family Ypsolophidae, known from North America.
