= Ypsolopha walsinghamiella =

Scientific classification
- Domain: Eukaryota
- Kingdom: Animalia
- Phylum: Arthropoda
- Class: Insecta
- Order: Lepidoptera
- Family: Ypsolophidae
- Genus: Ypsolopha
- Species: Y. walsinghamiella

Binomial name
- Ypsolopha walsinghamiella (Busck, 1903)

Synonyms
- Trachoma walsinghamiella Busck, 1903

Species of moth

Ypsolopha walsinghamiella is a moth of the family Ypsolophidae. It is known from the United States, including Arizona and California.

The wingspan is about 20–25 mm.

The antennae are whitish, sharply annulated with black. The labial palpi have a very long tuft on the second joint, more than twice as long as terminal joint. They are whitish and thickly mottled with black. The face and head are whitish-gray with a few black scales and the thorax is light iron gray with a central longitudinal darker, blackish line. The forewings are light bluish-gray, overlaid with white, light ochreous, dark gray and black scales. The dark and light scales are so arranged in narrow longitudinal undefined lines as to give the wing an indistinct striated appearance. The extreme dorsal edge is darker than the rest of the wing, blackish fuscous, and is limited above by a thin wavy more or less interrupted white line. Above this line in the dorsal part of the wing are several small tufts of erect black scales. The hindwings are rather dark shining fuscous and the legs and underside of the body are whitish-gray, mottled with black scales.
