= Ypsolopha manniella =

Scientific classification
- Domain: Eukaryota
- Kingdom: Animalia
- Phylum: Arthropoda
- Class: Insecta
- Order: Lepidoptera
- Family: Ypsolophidae
- Genus: Ypsolopha
- Species: Y. manniella

Binomial name
- Ypsolopha manniella (Staudinger, 1880)

Synonyms
- Cerostoma manniella Staudinger, 1880

Species of moth

Ypsolopha manniella is a moth of the family Ypsolophidae. It is known from Crete and Turkey.

The wingspan is 14–16 mm.

The larvae feed on Ephedra species.
