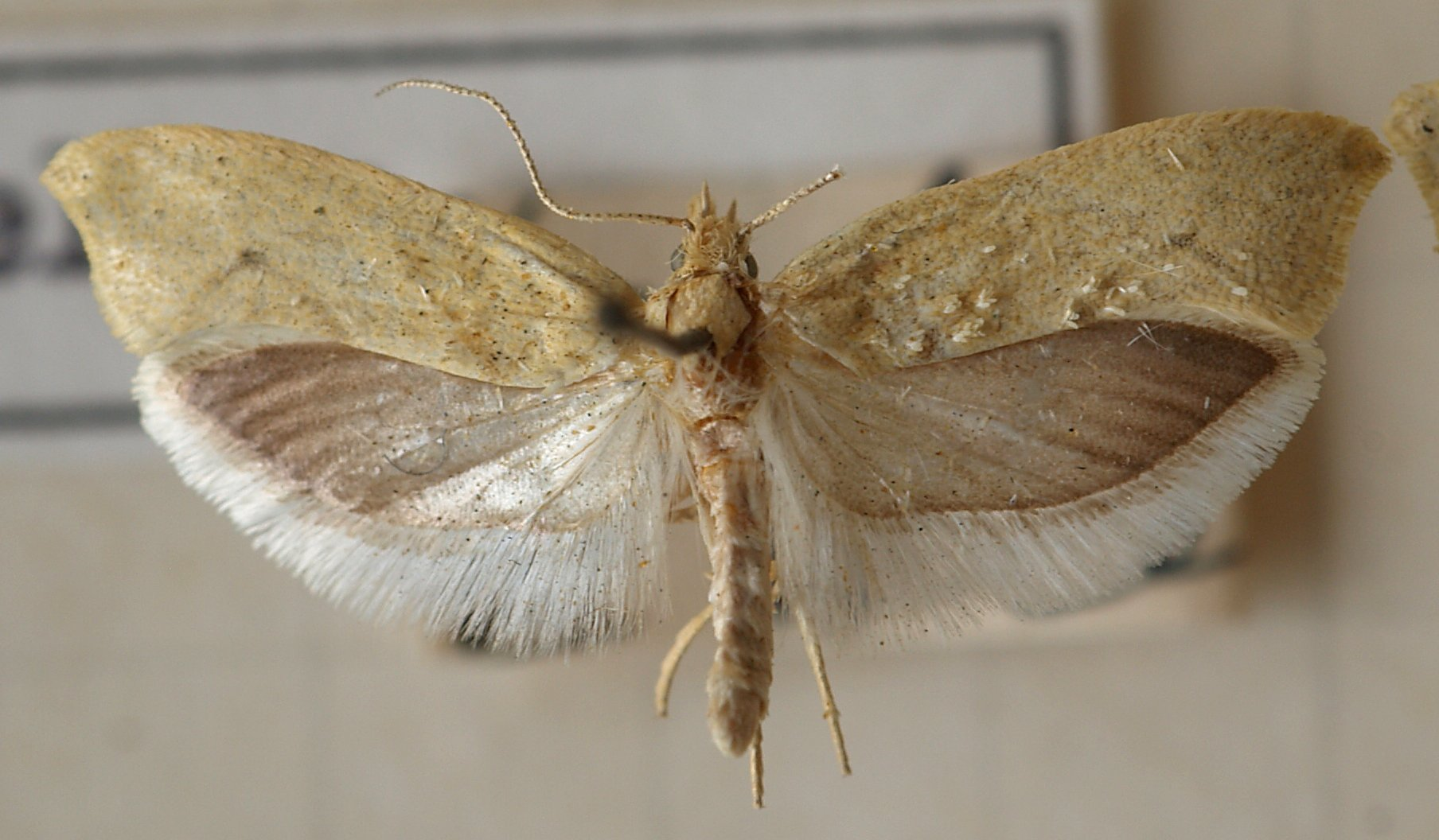

Scientific classification
- Domain: Eukaryota
- Kingdom: Animalia
- Phylum: Arthropoda
- Class: Insecta
- Order: Lepidoptera
- Family: Ypsolophidae
- Genus: Ypsolopha
- Species: Y. persicella

Binomial name
- Ypsolopha persicella (Fabricius, 1787)

Synonyms
- Alucita persicella Fabricius 1787

= Ypsolopha persicella =

Species of moth

Ypsolopha persicella is a moth of the family Ypsolophidae. It is found in southern-eastern and central Europe, the Crimea, the Caucasus and Asia Minor.

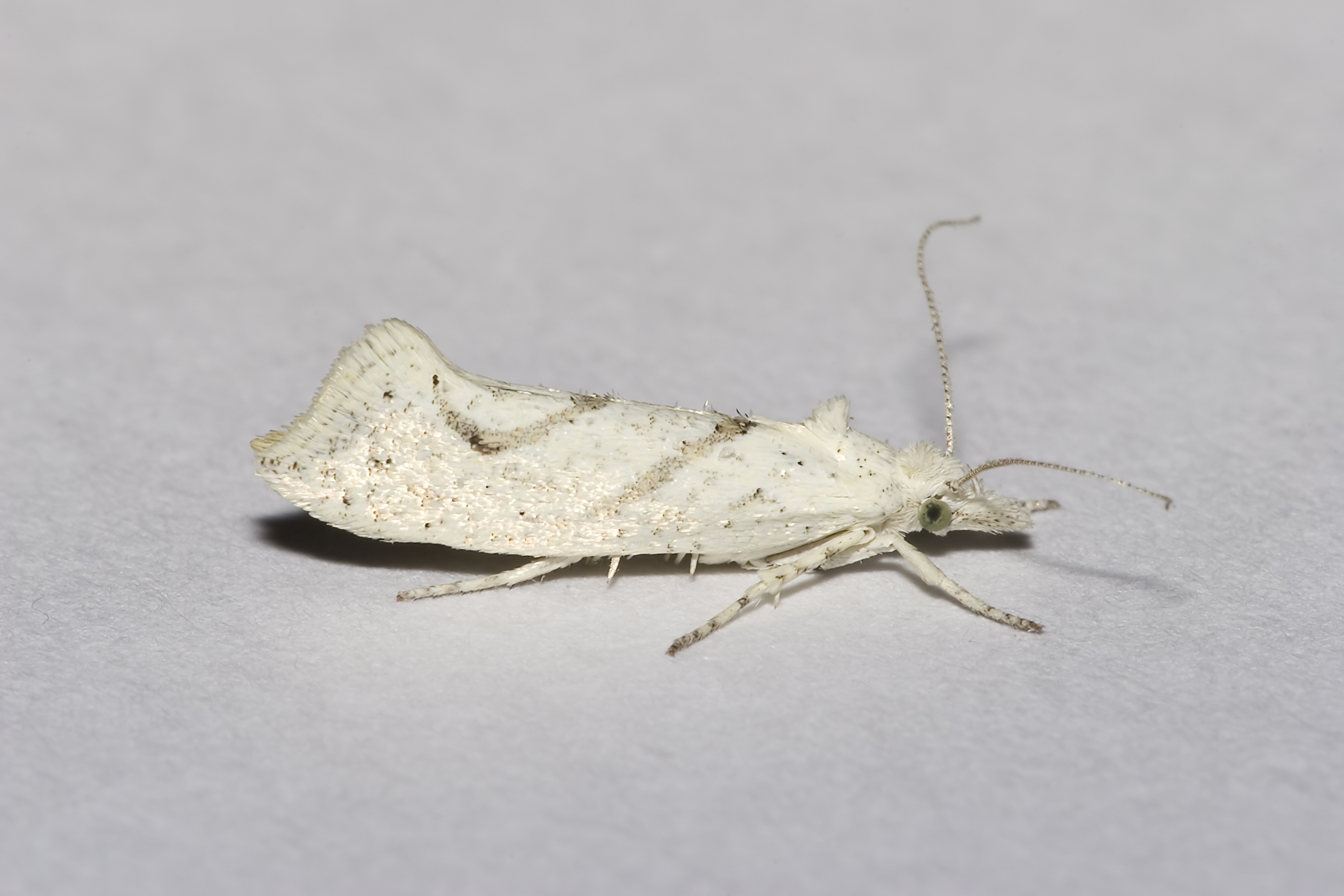

The wingspan is 19–21 mm.

The larvae feed on Rosaceae species, including almond, apricot and peach.
