= Ypsolopha striatella =

Scientific classification
- Kingdom: Animalia
- Phylum: Arthropoda
- Class: Insecta
- Order: Lepidoptera
- Family: Ypsolophidae
- Genus: Ypsolopha
- Species: Y. striatella

Binomial name
- Ypsolopha striatella (Dyar, 1903)

Synonyms
- Cerostoma striatella Dyar, 1903

Species of moth

Ypsolopha striatella is a moth of the family Ypsolophidae. It is known from the United States, including California.

The wingspan is about 22 mm.

The antennae are white towards the apex with dark brown annulations. The labial palpi, especially the second joint, are unusually short for the genus Ypsolopha. The brush is also very short and the terminal joint is thickened with rough scales. It is white with a few dark scales on the third joint. The head and thorax are white, with a narrow black streak on the shoulders. The forewings are dull chalky white with narrow more or less interrupted purplish-black longitudinal streaks. The hindwings are light ochreous fuscous and whitish towards the edges. The abdomen are white but mottled with dark fuscous above. The legs are whitish, slightly mottled with fuscous.
