= Ypsolopha exsularis =

Scientific classification
- Kingdom: Animalia
- Phylum: Arthropoda
- Class: Insecta
- Order: Lepidoptera
- Family: Ypsolophidae
- Genus: Ypsolopha
- Species: Y. exsularis

Binomial name
- Ypsolopha exsularis (Meyrick, 1937)

Species of moth

Ypsolopha exsularis is a moth of the family Ypsolophidae. It is known from South Africa.
