= Ypsolopha fractella =

Scientific classification
- Domain: Eukaryota
- Kingdom: Animalia
- Phylum: Arthropoda
- Class: Insecta
- Order: Lepidoptera
- Family: Ypsolophidae
- Genus: Ypsolopha
- Species: Y. fractella

Binomial name
- Ypsolopha fractella (Chrétien, 1915)

Synonyms
- Cerostoma fractella Chrétien, 1915

Species of moth

Ypsolopha fractella is a moth of the family Ypsolophidae. It is known from Spain and Tunisia.

The wingspan is 14.5–17 mm.

The larvae feed on Ephedra altissima.
