= Ypsolopha uniformis =

Scientific classification
- Domain: Eukaryota
- Kingdom: Animalia
- Phylum: Arthropoda
- Class: Insecta
- Order: Lepidoptera
- Family: Ypsolophidae
- Genus: Ypsolopha
- Species: Y. uniformis

Binomial name
- Ypsolopha uniformis (Filipjev, 1929)

Species of moth

Ypsolopha uniformis is a moth of the family Ypsolophidae. It was described by Ivan Nikolayevich Filipjev in 1929 and is known from Buryatia, a republic of Russia.
