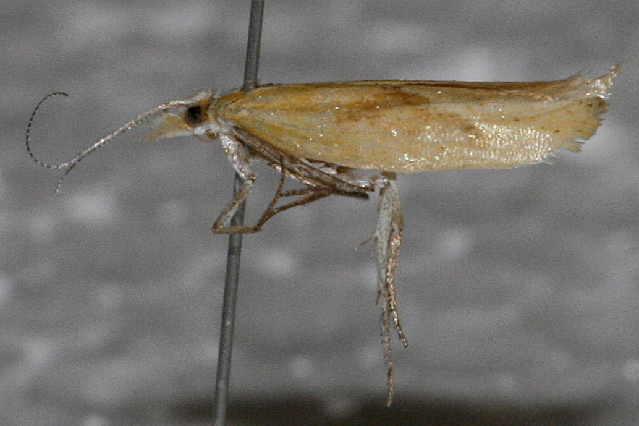

Scientific classification
- Domain: Eukaryota
- Kingdom: Animalia
- Phylum: Arthropoda
- Class: Insecta
- Order: Lepidoptera
- Family: Ypsolophidae
- Genus: Ypsolopha
- Species: Y. canariella

Binomial name
- Ypsolopha canariella (Walsingham, 1881)

Synonyms
- Cerostoma canariella Walsingham, 1881; Harpipteryx canariella

= Ypsolopha canariella =

Canary ypsolopha moth

Species of moth

Ypsolopha canariella, the canary ypsolopha moth, is a moth of the family Ypsolophidae. The species was first described by Lord Walsingham in 1881. It is found throughout North America from sea level up to elevations of 1,830 meters. In Canada it occurs in most provinces, from British Columbia and Alberta to Ontario. It is present in most of the continental United States. It is known from a wide variety of habitats, including mixed wood forests, semi-arid scrubland, prairies and badlands.

The wingspan is about 20 mm. Adults are on wing from June to September.
