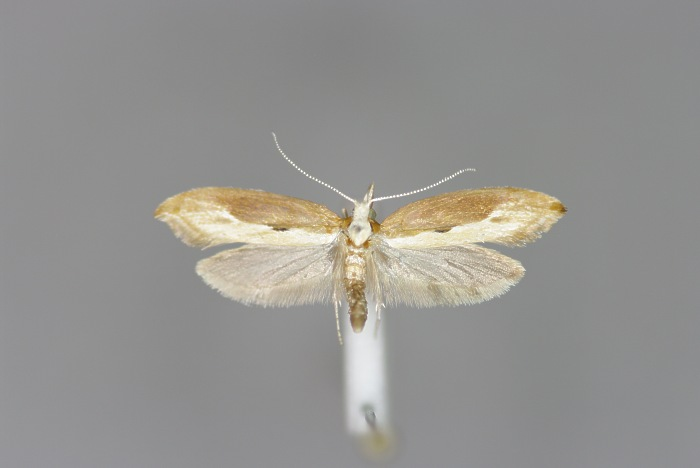

Scientific classification
- Domain: Eukaryota
- Kingdom: Animalia
- Phylum: Arthropoda
- Class: Insecta
- Order: Lepidoptera
- Family: Ypsolophidae
- Genus: Ypsolopha
- Species: Y. falcella

Binomial name
- Ypsolopha falcella (Denis & Schiffermüller, 1775)

Synonyms
- Tinea falcella Denis & Schiffermüller, 1775

= Ypsolopha falcella =

Species of moth

Ypsolopha falcella is a moth of the family Ypsolophidae. It is known from northern and central Europe and Russia.

The wingspan is 17–20 mm. The antennas lies just over half the length of front wing. A wide, yellow-white longitudinal line runs almost to the trailing edge from the base.

The larvae feed on Lonicera species.
