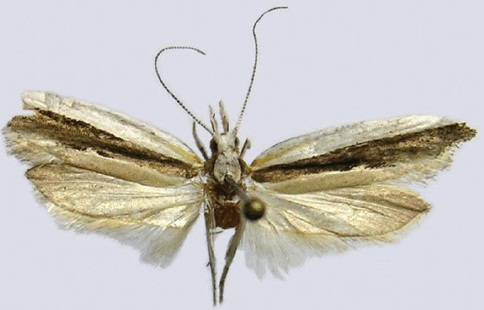

Scientific classification
- Domain: Eukaryota
- Kingdom: Animalia
- Phylum: Arthropoda
- Class: Insecta
- Order: Lepidoptera
- Family: Ypsolophidae
- Genus: Ypsolopha
- Species: Y. nigrofasciata

Binomial name
- Ypsolopha nigrofasciata Yang, 1977

= Ypsolopha nigrofasciata =

Species of moth

Ypsolopha nigrofasciata is a moth of the family Ypsolophidae. It is known from China (Hebei) and the Russian Far East.
