= Ypsolopha nebulella =

Scientific classification
- Domain: Eukaryota
- Kingdom: Animalia
- Phylum: Arthropoda
- Class: Insecta
- Order: Lepidoptera
- Family: Ypsolophidae
- Genus: Ypsolopha
- Species: Y. nebulella

Binomial name
- Ypsolopha nebulella (Staudinger, 1871)

Synonyms
- Cerostoma nebulella Staudinger, 1871

Species of moth

Ypsolopha nebulella is a moth of the family Ypsolophidae. It is known from Russia.

The wingspan is 17–18 mm.
