= Ypsolopha parodaula =

Scientific classification
- Kingdom: Animalia
- Phylum: Arthropoda
- Class: Insecta
- Order: Lepidoptera
- Family: Ypsolophidae
- Genus: Ypsolopha
- Species: Y. parodaula

Binomial name
- Ypsolopha parodaula (Meyrick, 1938)

Synonyms
- Ypsolophus parodaula Meyrick, 1938

Species of moth

Ypsolopha parodaula is a moth of the family Ypsolophidae. It is known from Yunnan in China.
