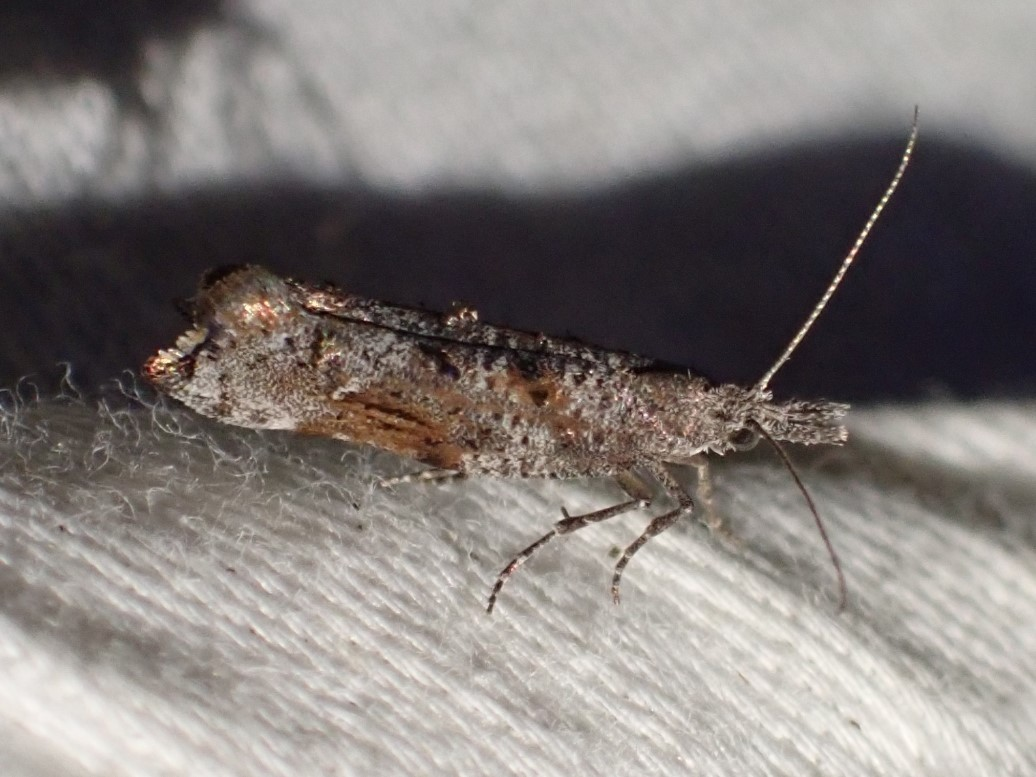

Scientific classification
- Domain: Eukaryota
- Kingdom: Animalia
- Phylum: Arthropoda
- Class: Insecta
- Order: Lepidoptera
- Family: Ypsolophidae
- Genus: Ypsolopha
- Species: Y. senex

Binomial name
- Ypsolopha senex (Walsingham, 1889)

Synonyms
- Trachoma senex Walsingham, 1889; Cerostoma koebelella Dyar, 1900

= Ypsolopha senex =

Species of moth

Ypsolopha senex is a species of moth in the family Ypsolophidae that was first described by Lord Walsingham in 1889. It is found throughout North America. In Canada it occurs in most provinces, from British Columbia and Alberta to Manitoba. It is present in most of the continental United States. It is known from a wide variety of habitats, including riparian ecosystems, mixed wood forest and alpine tundra.

They are of a uniform, drab colour. Adults are on wing from June to September. There is probably one generation per year.

The larvae feed on the leaves of Salix species.
