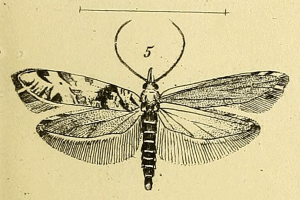

Scientific classification
- Domain: Eukaryota
- Kingdom: Animalia
- Phylum: Arthropoda
- Class: Insecta
- Order: Lepidoptera
- Family: Ypsolophidae
- Genus: Ypsolopha
- Species: Y. trichonella

Binomial name
- Ypsolopha trichonella (Mann, 1861)

Synonyms
- Plutella trichonella Mann, 1861

= Ypsolopha trichonella =

Species of moth

Ypsolopha trichonella is a moth of the family Ypsolophidae. The species is found in Spain, Croatia, the northern Aegean Islands and Turkmenistan.

The larvae feed on the Ephedra species.
