= Ypsolopha lonicerella =

Scientific classification
- Domain: Eukaryota
- Kingdom: Animalia
- Phylum: Arthropoda
- Class: Insecta
- Order: Lepidoptera
- Family: Ypsolophidae
- Genus: Ypsolopha
- Species: Y. lonicerella

Binomial name
- Ypsolopha lonicerella Stökl, 1922

Species of moth

Ypsolopha lonicerella is a moth of the family Ypsolophidae. It is known to be found in the eastern part of the Carpathian Mountains.

The wingspan is about 18–20 mm.
