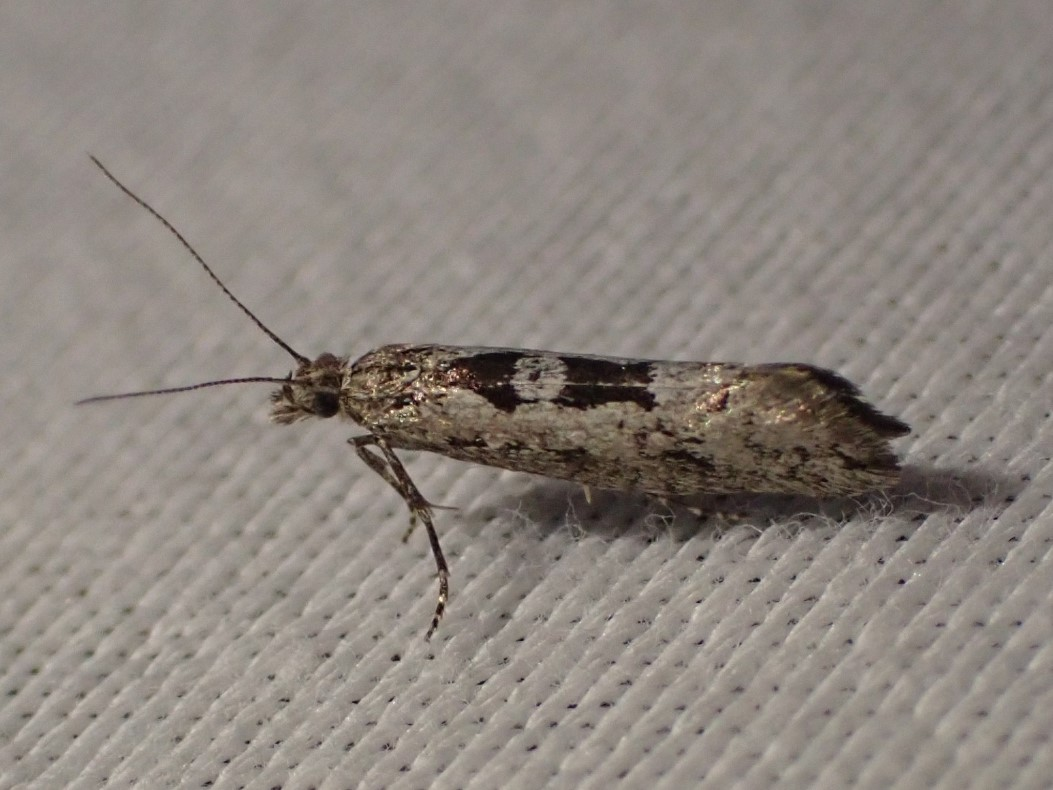

Scientific classification
- Domain: Eukaryota
- Kingdom: Animalia
- Phylum: Arthropoda
- Class: Insecta
- Order: Lepidoptera
- Family: Ypsolophidae
- Genus: Ypsolopha
- Species: Y. dorsimaculella

Binomial name
- Ypsolopha dorsimaculella (Kearfott, 1907)

Synonyms
- Cerostoma dorsimaculella Kearfott, 1907

= Ypsolopha dorsimaculella =

Species of moth

Ypsolopha dorsimaculella is a species of moth in the family Ypsolophidae that was first described by William D. Kearfott in 1907. It is found throughout North America. In Canada, it is known from British Columbia, Alberta and Saskatchewan.

The wingspan is 18.5–19.5 mm. Adults are on wing from June to August. Adults are of a uniform, drab colour.
