= Ypsolopha cockerella =

Scientific classification
- Domain: Eukaryota
- Kingdom: Animalia
- Phylum: Arthropoda
- Class: Insecta
- Order: Lepidoptera
- Family: Ypsolophidae
- Genus: Ypsolopha
- Species: Y. cockerella

Binomial name
- Ypsolopha cockerella (Dyar, 1903)

Synonyms
- Abebaea cockerella Dyar, 1903

Species of moth

Ypsolopha cockerella is a moth of the family Ypsolophidae. It is known from the United States, including New Mexico.

The wingspan is about 19–21 mm.

The antennae are white, each joint with a dark fuscous spot in front. The labial palpi are white and the tuft on the second joint is longer than the short terminal joint. The face, head and thorax are white with a slight yellowish tint and the shoulders are very light golden brown. The forewings are shining silvery white. There is a broad very light golden brown streak running from the base to the tornus along and crossing the fold and just below the costal edge is another similar narrower golden streak. The apical edge is touched with brown. The hindwings are light silvery fuscous and the legs and underside of the body are white.
