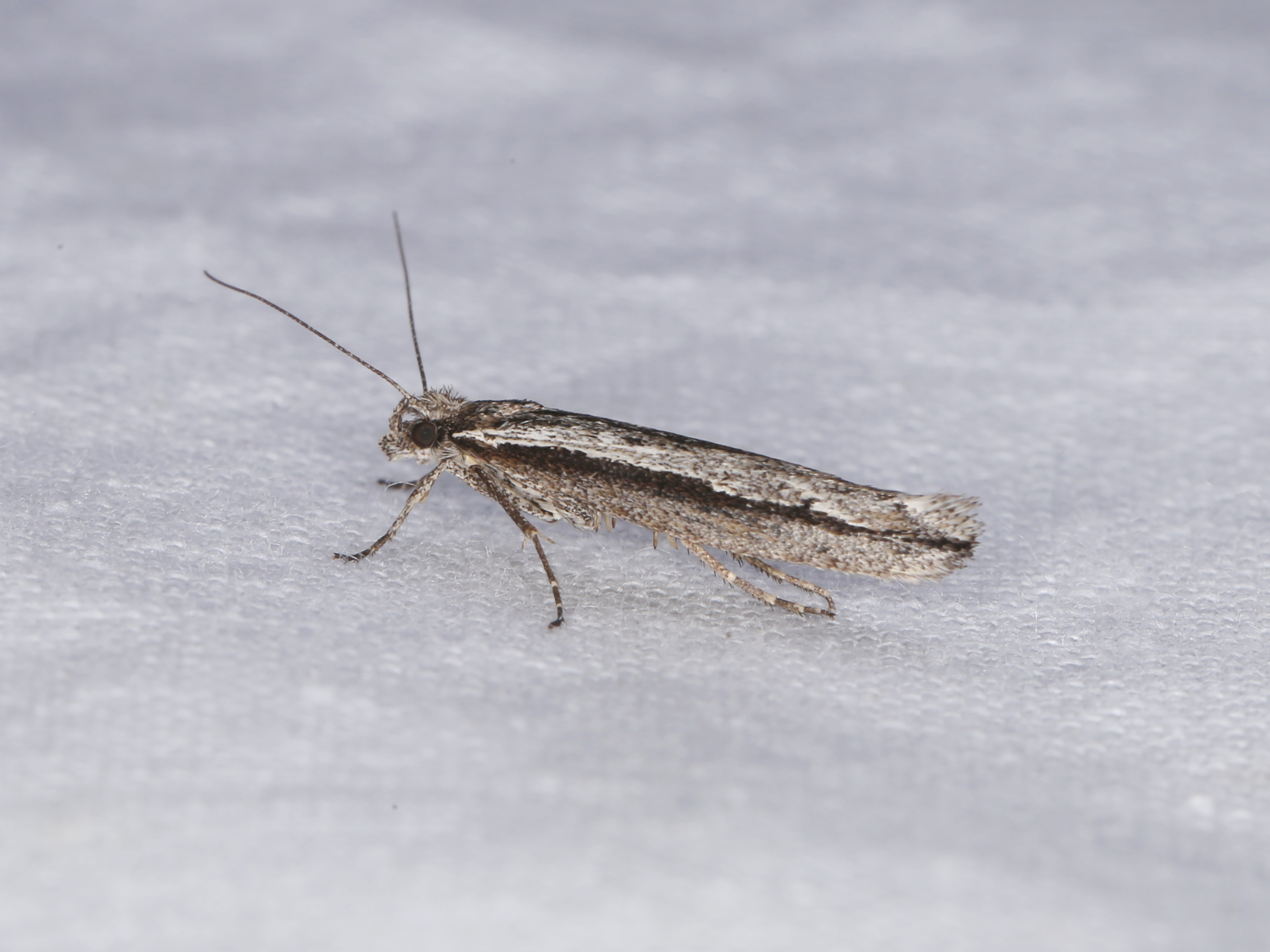

Scientific classification
- Domain: Eukaryota
- Kingdom: Animalia
- Phylum: Arthropoda
- Class: Insecta
- Order: Lepidoptera
- Family: Ypsolophidae
- Genus: Ypsolopha
- Species: Y. flavistrigella

Binomial name
- Ypsolopha flavistrigella (Busck, 1906)

Synonyms
- Cerostoma flavistrigella Busck, 1906

= Ypsolopha flavistrigella =

Species of moth

Ypsolopha flavistrigella is a moth of the family Ypsolophidae first described by August Busck in 1906. It was known only from the southern part of the United States (Texas, California, Utah and Colorado), but has also been recorded from Alberta, Canada.

The wingspan is about 23 mm. Adults are on wing from May to the beginning of October.

The larvae feed on the leaves of Salix species.
