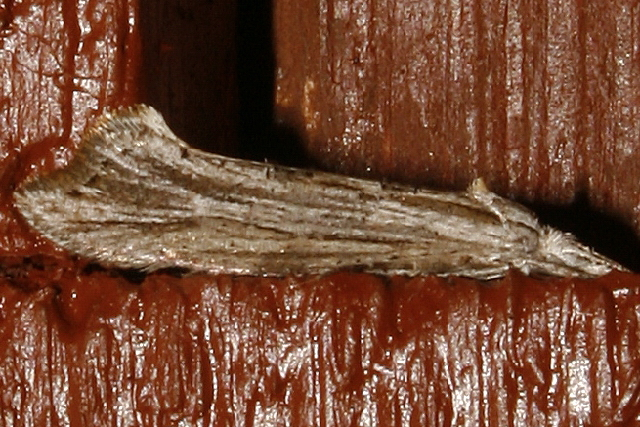

Scientific classification
- Domain: Eukaryota
- Kingdom: Animalia
- Phylum: Arthropoda
- Class: Insecta
- Order: Lepidoptera
- Family: Ypsolophidae
- Genus: Ypsolopha
- Species: Y. falciferella

Binomial name
- Ypsolopha falciferella (Walsingham, 1881)

Synonyms
- Cerostoma falciferella Walsingham, 1881; Ypsolophus ordinalis (Meyrick, 1914)

= Ypsolopha falciferella =

Species of moth

Ypsolopha falciferella is a species of moth in the family Ypsolophidae first described by Lord Walsingham in 1881. It is found throughout much of North America, including British Columbia, Alberta, Manitoba, Saskatchewan, Michigan and Maryland. It is known from a wide variety of habitats, including mixed wood forests, riparian habitats and semi-arid scrubland.

The wingspan is about 21 mm. Adults are on wing from June to beginning of October.

The larvae feed on Prunus virginiana. Pupation takes place in an elongated silken cocoon.
