= Ypsolopha delicatella =

Scientific classification
- Kingdom: Animalia
- Phylum: Arthropoda
- Class: Insecta
- Order: Lepidoptera
- Family: Ypsolophidae
- Genus: Ypsolopha
- Species: Y. delicatella

Binomial name
- Ypsolopha delicatella (Dyar, 1903)

Synonyms
- Abebaea delicatella Dyar, 1903

Species of moth

Ypsolopha delicatella is a moth of the family Ypsolophidae. It is known from the United States, including Arizona and California.

The wingspan is about 17 mm.

The labial palpi are white, the second joint sprinkled with a few black scales on the outside and the terminal joint with a small black spot at the base. The tuft on the second joint is compressed, pointed and longer than the terminal joint. The head and thorax are white. The dorsal half of the forewings from base to tornus is dark reddish-brown, with strong purple reflections, but lighter and more yellowish on the dorsal edge, gradually becoming darker and more purple towards the middle of the wing. Bordering this dorsal part, the edge of which is sharply defined as a straight central line, is a longitudinal pure white streak. Above this, the costal part of the wing is bright golden yellow. The costal yellow part is produced somewhat further out in the apical part of the wing than the darker dorsal color, that stops abruptly at the tornus. The apical part of the wing is white, delicately mottled with black, each scale having a thin curved black edge. The hindwings are light silvery ochreous, but slightly darker, fuscous towards apex. The legs are white, the anterior two pairs mottled with black.
