= Ypsolopha acerella =

Scientific classification
- Kingdom: Animalia
- Phylum: Arthropoda
- Class: Insecta
- Order: Lepidoptera
- Family: Ypsolophidae
- Genus: Ypsolopha
- Species: Y. acerella

Binomial name
- Ypsolopha acerella Ponomarenko & Sohn, 2011

Species of moth

Ypsolopha acerella is a moth of the family Ypsolophidae. It is known from the Russian Far East and Korea.

The length of the forewings is 7.8–8.3 mm.

The larvae feed on Acer ginnala.

== Etymology ==
The specific name is derived from the generic name of the host plant, Acer.
