= Ypsolopha amoenella =

Scientific classification
- Domain: Eukaryota
- Kingdom: Animalia
- Phylum: Arthropoda
- Class: Insecta
- Order: Lepidoptera
- Family: Ypsolophidae
- Genus: Ypsolopha
- Species: Y. amoenella

Binomial name
- Ypsolopha amoenella (Christoph, 1882)

Synonyms
- Cerostoma amoenella Christoph, 1882; Ypsolopha menoko Matsumura, 1931

Species of moth

Ypsolopha amoenella is a moth of the family Ypsolophidae. It is known from Japan, Korea, north-eastern China and Russia.

The wingspan is 18–20 mm.

The larvae feed on Acer mono.
