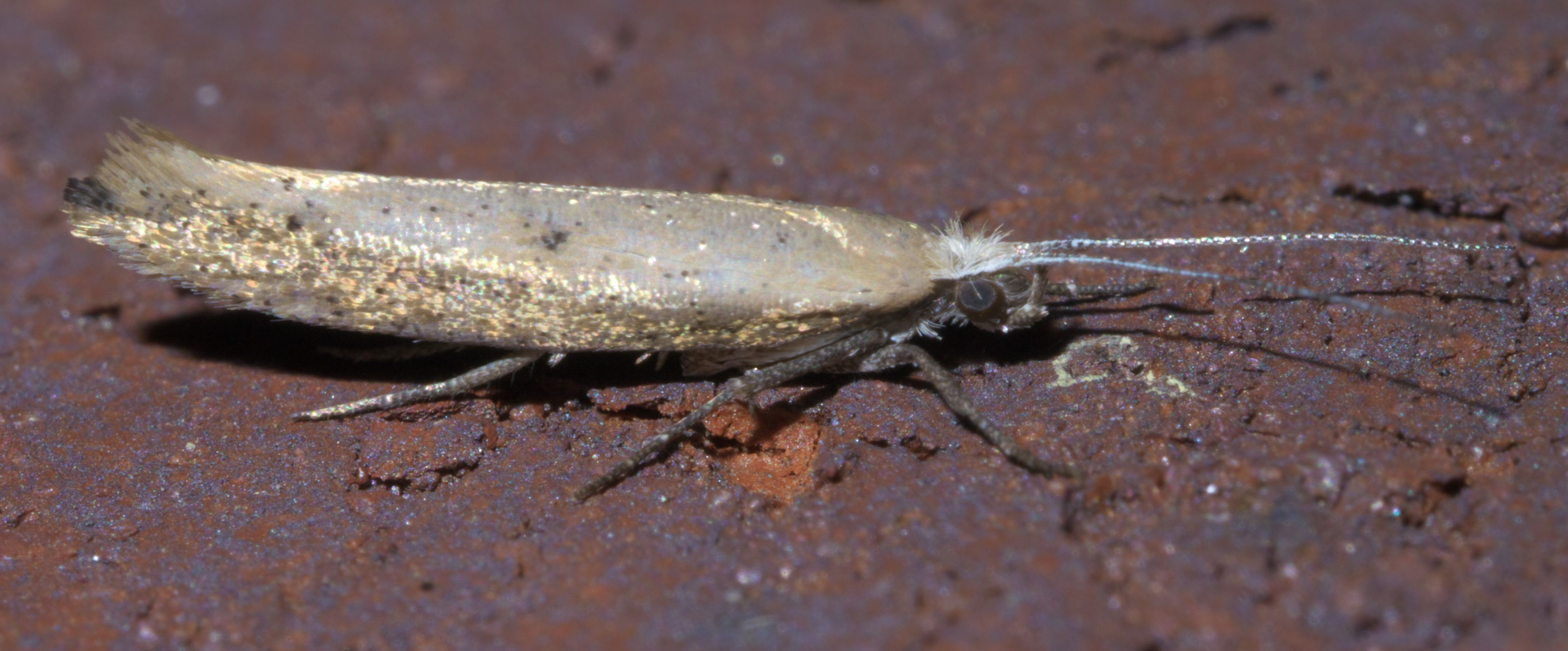

Scientific classification
- Domain: Eukaryota
- Kingdom: Animalia
- Phylum: Arthropoda
- Class: Insecta
- Order: Lepidoptera
- Family: Ypsolophidae
- Genus: Ypsolopha
- Species: Y. unicipunctella

Binomial name
- Ypsolopha unicipunctella (Busck, 1903)

Synonyms
- Cerostoma unicipunctella Busck, 1903

= Ypsolopha unicipunctella =

Species of moth

Ypsolopha unicipunctella is a moth of the family Ypsolophidae. It is known from the United States, including Oklahoma, Texas and Arizona.

The wingspan is 17–23 mm.

The antennae are white, dotted with dark brown. The labial palpi on the outside are dark fuscous, striated transversely with white. The underside and inside of the second joint are silvery white. The brush is small and the terminal joint is thickened in front with rough scales. The face, head, thorax and anterior wings are unicolored pale olive buff with golden reflections. There is a conspicuous black round dot and a few scattered black scales at the end of the cell, especially in the apical part of the wing. The hindwings are light silvery gray, deepening toward the edges.
