= Ypsolopha ephedrella =

Scientific classification
- Domain: Eukaryota
- Kingdom: Animalia
- Phylum: Arthropoda
- Class: Insecta
- Order: Lepidoptera
- Family: Ypsolophidae
- Genus: Ypsolopha
- Species: Y. ephedrella

Binomial name
- Ypsolopha ephedrella (Christoph, 1873)

Species of moth

Ypsolopha ephedrella is a moth of the family Ypsolophidae. It is known from Turkmenistan and Kyrgyzstan.
