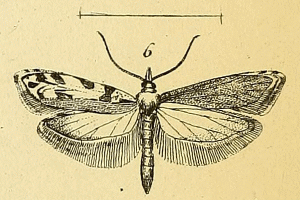

Scientific classification
- Domain: Eukaryota
- Kingdom: Animalia
- Phylum: Arthropoda
- Class: Insecta
- Order: Lepidoptera
- Family: Ypsolophidae
- Genus: Ypsolopha
- Species: Y. semitessella

Binomial name
- Ypsolopha semitessella (Mann, 1861)

Synonyms
- Plutella semitessella Mann, 1861

= Ypsolopha semitessella =

Species of moth

Ypsolopha semitessella is a moth of the family Ypsolophidae. It is known from Croatia and North Macedonia.
