= Ypsolopha heteraula =

Scientific classification
- Kingdom: Animalia
- Phylum: Arthropoda
- Class: Insecta
- Order: Lepidoptera
- Family: Ypsolophidae
- Genus: Ypsolopha
- Species: Y. heteraula

Binomial name
- Ypsolopha heteraula (Meyrick, 1927)

Synonyms
- Melitonympha heteraula Meyrick, 1927

Species of moth

Ypsolopha heteraula is a moth of the family Ypsolophidae. It is known from North America.
