= Ypsolopha cajaliella =

Scientific classification
- Domain: Eukaryota
- Kingdom: Animalia
- Phylum: Arthropoda
- Class: Insecta
- Order: Lepidoptera
- Family: Ypsolophidae
- Genus: Ypsolopha
- Species: Y. cajaliella

Binomial name
- Ypsolopha cajaliella Vives, 2003

Species of moth

Ypsolopha cajaliella is a moth of the family Ypsolophidae. It is known from Spain.
