= Ypsolopha oliviella =

Scientific classification
- Domain: Eukaryota
- Kingdom: Animalia
- Phylum: Arthropoda
- Class: Insecta
- Order: Lepidoptera
- Family: Ypsolophidae
- Genus: Ypsolopha
- Species: Y. oliviella

Binomial name
- Ypsolopha oliviella (Busck, 1903)

Synonyms
- Cerostoma oliviella Busck, 1903

Species of moth

Ypsolopha oliviella is a moth of the family Ypsolophidae. It is known from the United States, including Arizona.

The wingspan is about 21.5 mm (0.85 in).

The antennae are silvery white with narrow dark brown annulations. The labial palpi are yellowish-brown, mottled on the outside with dark brown scales. The tuft is small and the terminal joint is roughened in front. The head and thorax are light brown. The forewings are olive-brown, closely and uniformly sprinkled with dark purplish-brown or blackish atoms, which give the wings a purplish sheen. The hindwings are light silvery fuscous and the legs are light brown mottled with black.
