= Ypsolopha sublucella =

Scientific classification
- Domain: Eukaryota
- Kingdom: Animalia
- Phylum: Arthropoda
- Class: Insecta
- Order: Lepidoptera
- Family: Ypsolophidae
- Genus: Ypsolopha
- Species: Y. sublucella

Binomial name
- Ypsolopha sublucella (Walsingham, 1881)

Synonyms
- Cerostoma sublucella Walsingham 1881; Abebaea sublucella

Species of moth

Ypsolopha sublucella is a moth of the family Ypsolophidae. It is known from California, United States.

The larvae feed on oaks of the section Protobalanus (intermediate oaks), including Quercus vaccinifolia.
