= Ypsolopha barberella =

Scientific classification
- Domain: Eukaryota
- Kingdom: Animalia
- Phylum: Arthropoda
- Class: Insecta
- Order: Lepidoptera
- Family: Ypsolophidae
- Genus: Ypsolopha
- Species: Y. barberella

Binomial name
- Ypsolopha barberella (Busck, 1903)

Synonyms
- Cerostoma barberella Busck, 1903

Species of moth

Ypsolopha barberella is a moth of the family Ypsolophidae. It is known from the United States, including Arizona, Nevada and Utah.

The wingspan is 19–24 mm.

The antennae are dark fuscous with a few scattered white scales especially toward the apex. The labial are palpi black, mottled with light ochreous and white scales. The brush on the second joint is well developed but shorter than the terminal joint which is strongly roughened in front. The head and thorax are dark pepper and salt colored. The forewings have a light whitish steel-gray ground color, strongly overlaid with black and dark fuscous scales. The hindwings are shining dark fuscous, nearly black towards the edges. The abdomen is dark purplish fuscous and the legs are nearly black with a strong purple reflection.
