= Ypsolopha dentiferella =

Scientific classification
- Domain: Eukaryota
- Kingdom: Animalia
- Phylum: Arthropoda
- Class: Insecta
- Order: Lepidoptera
- Family: Ypsolophidae
- Genus: Ypsolopha
- Species: Y. dentiferella

Binomial name
- Ypsolopha dentiferella (Walsingham, 1881)

Synonyms
- Cerostoma dentiferella Walsingham, 1881; Harpipteryx dentiferella; Periclymenobius dentiferella

Species of moth

Ypsolopha dentiferella is a moth of the family Ypsolophidae first described by Lord Walsingham in 1881. It is found throughout North America. In Canada, it occurs in most provinces, being most frequently collected in British Columbia and Alberta. It has been found in a wide variety of habitats, including mixed wood forests, semi-arid scrubland, prairies and badlands.

The wingspan is about 20 mm. Adults are on wing from June to September.

The larvae have been reared on Pinus banksiana.
