= Ypsolopha acuminata =

Scientific classification
- Domain: Eukaryota
- Kingdom: Animalia
- Phylum: Arthropoda
- Class: Insecta
- Order: Lepidoptera
- Family: Ypsolophidae
- Genus: Ypsolopha
- Species: Y. acuminata

Binomial name
- Ypsolopha acuminata (Butler, 1878)

Synonyms
- Chilo acuminatus Butler, 1878; Ypsolopha acuminatus

Species of moth

Ypsolopha acuminata is a moth of the family Ypsolophidae. It is known from Japan, Korea, north-eastern China and Russia.

The wingspan is 25–27 mm.
