= Ypsolopha frustella =

Scientific classification
- Domain: Eukaryota
- Kingdom: Animalia
- Phylum: Arthropoda
- Class: Insecta
- Order: Lepidoptera
- Family: Ypsolophidae
- Genus: Ypsolopha
- Species: Y. frustella

Binomial name
- Ypsolopha frustella (Walsingham, 1881)

Synonyms
- Cerostoma frustella Walsingham, 1881; Harpipteryx frustella; Periclymenobius frustella

Species of moth

Ypsolopha frustella is a moth of the family Ypsolophidae. It is known from the United States, including California.
