= Ypsolopha lutisplendida =

Scientific classification
- Kingdom: Animalia
- Phylum: Arthropoda
- Class: Insecta
- Order: Lepidoptera
- Family: Ypsolophidae
- Genus: Ypsolopha
- Species: Y. lutisplendida

Binomial name
- Ypsolopha lutisplendida Ponomarenko & Sohn, 2011

Species of moth

Ypsolopha lutisplendida is a moth of the family Ypsolophidae. It is known from north-western China.

The length of the forewings is 9.6–10.7 mm.

The larvae feed on the pine tree Pinus tabulaeformis.
