= Ypsolopha angelicella =

Scientific classification
- Domain: Eukaryota
- Kingdom: Animalia
- Phylum: Arthropoda
- Class: Insecta
- Order: Lepidoptera
- Family: Ypsolophidae
- Genus: Ypsolopha
- Species: Y. angelicella

Binomial name
- Ypsolopha angelicella (Busck, 1903)

Synonyms
- Cerostoma angelicella Busck, 1903

Species of moth

Ypsolopha angelicella is a moth of the family Ypsolophidae. It is known from the United States, including California.

The moth has a wingspan of 19–22 mm. Its antennae are white with sharp black annulations. The palpi, head and thorax are white and the shoulders yellowish. The forewings are white with striking fawn-brown ornamentation. The hindwings are shining ochreous white and the legs and underside of the body are white.
