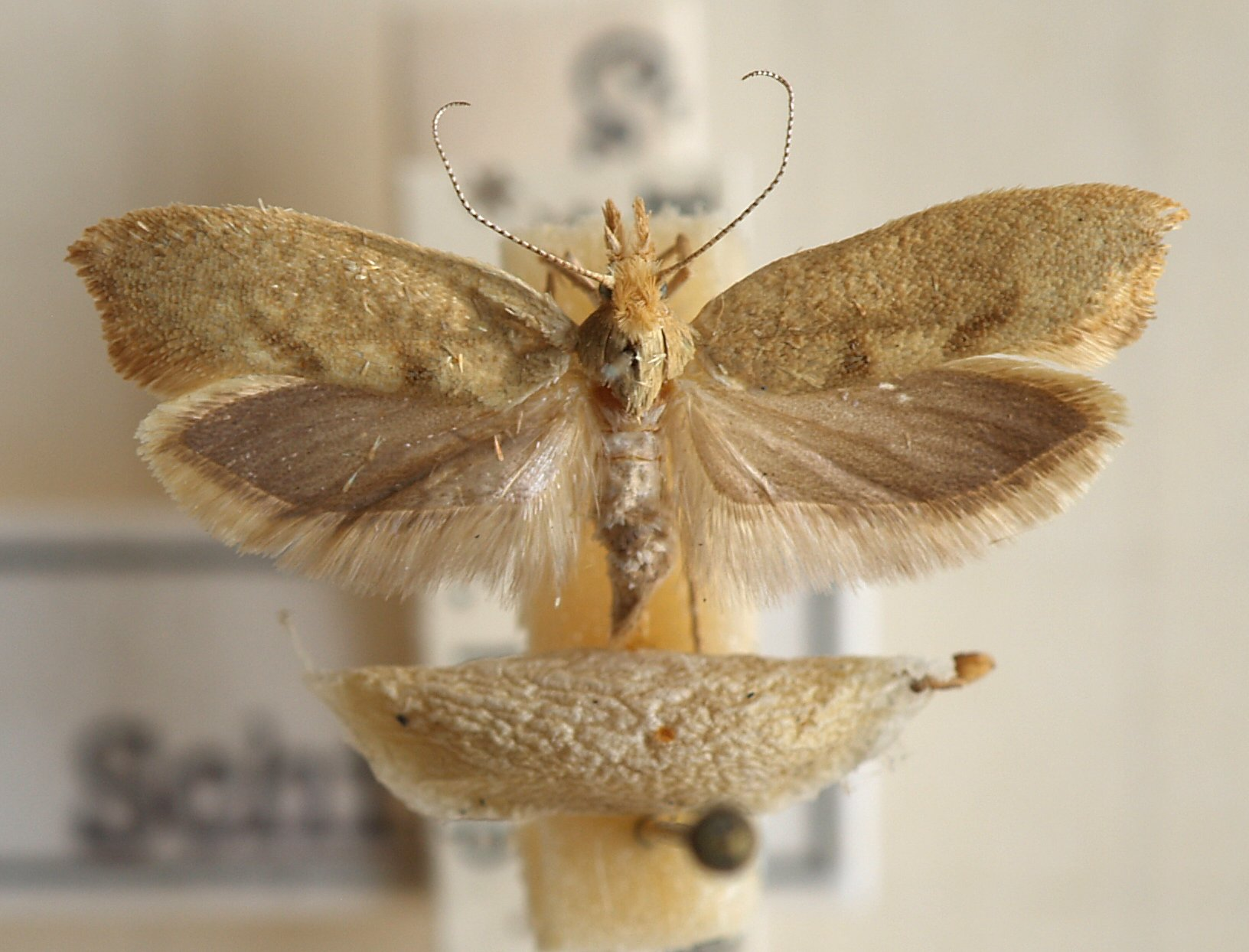
- Mounted

Scientific classification
- Domain: Eukaryota
- Kingdom: Animalia
- Phylum: Arthropoda
- Class: Insecta
- Order: Lepidoptera
- Family: Ypsolophidae
- Genus: Ypsolopha
- Species: Y. alpella

Binomial name
- Ypsolopha alpella Denis & Schiffermüller, 1775

= Ypsolopha alpella =

Species of moth

Ypsolopha alpella is a moth of the family Ypsolophidae. It is found in southern and central Europe and Siberia.

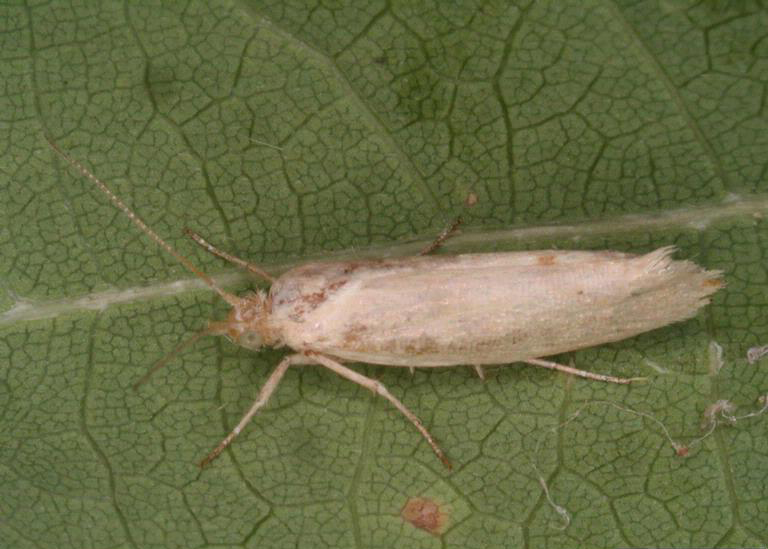

The wingspan is approximately 16 mm. The moth flies from June to October depending on the location.

The larvae feed on oak.
