= Ypsolopha helva =

Scientific classification
- Kingdom: Animalia
- Phylum: Arthropoda
- Clade: Pancrustacea
- Class: Insecta
- Order: Lepidoptera
- Family: Ypsolophidae
- Genus: Ypsolopha
- Species: Y. helva

Binomial name
- Ypsolopha helva J.C. Sohn & C.S. Wu, in Sohn et al., 2010

Species of moth

Ypsolopha helva is a moth of the family Ypsolophidae. It is known from north-western China.

The length of the forewings is 6.7 mm.
