= Ypsolopha strigosa =

Scientific classification
- Domain: Eukaryota
- Kingdom: Animalia
- Phylum: Arthropoda
- Class: Insecta
- Order: Lepidoptera
- Family: Ypsolophidae
- Genus: Ypsolopha
- Species: Y. strigosa

Binomial name
- Ypsolopha strigosa (Butler, 1879)

Synonyms
- Cerostoma strigosa Butler, 1879; Ypsolopha strigosus

Species of moth

Ypsolopha strigosa is a moth of the family Ypsolophidae. It is known from Japan, Korea, China and Russia.

The wingspan is 23–26 mm.
