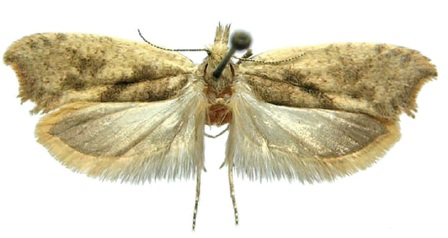

Scientific classification
- Kingdom: Animalia
- Phylum: Arthropoda
- Class: Insecta
- Order: Lepidoptera
- Family: Ypsolophidae
- Genus: Ypsolopha
- Species: Y. straminella

Binomial name
- Ypsolopha straminella Ponomarenko & Zinchenko, 2013

= Ypsolopha straminella =

Species of moth

Ypsolopha straminella is a moth of the family Ypsolophidae. It is found in the Russian Far East.

The wingspan is 16.5–17.3 mm.
