= Ypsolopha atrobrunnella =

Scientific classification
- Kingdom: Animalia
- Phylum: Arthropoda
- Class: Insecta
- Order: Lepidoptera
- Family: Ypsolophidae
- Genus: Ypsolopha
- Species: Y. atrobrunnella

Binomial name
- Ypsolopha atrobrunnella Ponomarenko & Sohn, 2011

Species of moth

Ypsolopha atrobrunnella is a moth of the family Ypsolophidae. It is known from the southern part of the Russian Far East and north-eastern China.

The length of the forewings is 8.1–8.4 mm.

The larvae feed on Crataegus maximowiczii and Pyrus species.
