= Ypsolopha indecorella =

Scientific classification
- Domain: Eukaryota
- Kingdom: Animalia
- Phylum: Arthropoda
- Class: Insecta
- Order: Lepidoptera
- Family: Ypsolophidae
- Genus: Ypsolopha
- Species: Y. indecorella

Binomial name
- Ypsolopha indecorella (Rebel, 1903)

Synonyms
- Cerostoma indecorella Rebel, 1903

Species of moth

Ypsolopha indecorella is a moth of the family Ypsolophidae. It is known from France.

The wingspan is about 21 mm.
