= Ypsolopha aleutianella =

Scientific classification
- Domain: Eukaryota
- Kingdom: Animalia
- Phylum: Arthropoda
- Class: Insecta
- Order: Lepidoptera
- Family: Ypsolophidae
- Genus: Ypsolopha
- Species: Y. aleutianella

Binomial name
- Ypsolopha aleutianella (Beutenmüller, 1889)

Synonyms
- Cerostoma aleutianella Beutenmüller, 1889

Species of moth

Ypsolopha aleutianella is a moth of the family Ypsolophidae. It is known from the Aleutian Islands.
