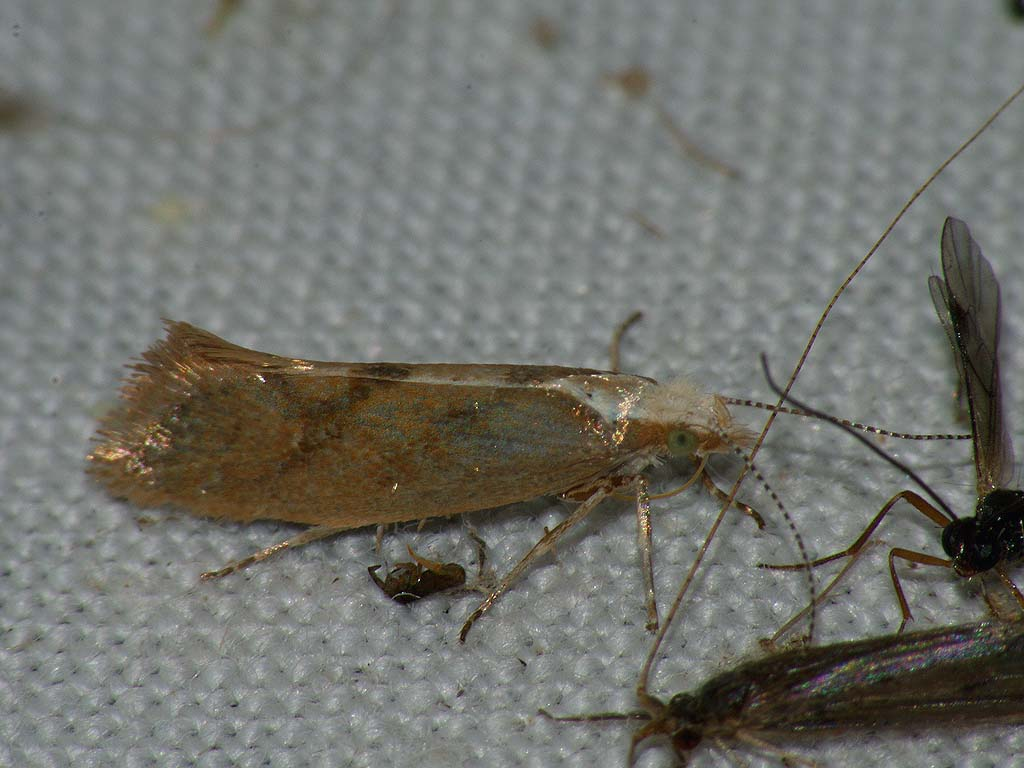

Scientific classification
- Domain: Eukaryota
- Kingdom: Animalia
- Phylum: Arthropoda
- Class: Insecta
- Order: Lepidoptera
- Family: Ypsolophidae
- Genus: Ypsolopha
- Species: Y. sarmaticella

Binomial name
- Ypsolopha sarmaticella (Rebel, 1917)

Synonyms
- Cerostoma sarmaticella Rebel, 1917

= Ypsolopha sarmaticella =

Species of moth

Ypsolopha sarmaticella is a moth of the family Ypsolophidae. It is known from Finland, Estonia, Latvia, Russia (Russian Plain, the West Siberian Plain and the South Siberian Mountains) and Ukraine.

The wingspan is about 15 mm.

The larvae have been recorded feeding on Caragana species.
