= Ypsolopha albistriatus =

Scientific classification
- Kingdom: Animalia
- Phylum: Arthropoda
- Class: Insecta
- Order: Lepidoptera
- Family: Ypsolophidae
- Genus: Ypsolopha
- Species: Y. albistriatus

Binomial name
- Ypsolopha albistriatus (Issiki, 1930)

Synonyms
- Cerostoma albistriata Issiki, 1930; Ypsolopha albistriata Matsumura, 1931

Species of moth

Ypsolopha albistriatus is a moth of the family Ypsolophidae. It is found in Japan and Russia.

The wingspan is 24–26 mm.
