= Ypsolopha fujimotoi =

Scientific classification
- Kingdom: Animalia
- Phylum: Arthropoda
- Class: Insecta
- Order: Lepidoptera
- Family: Ypsolophidae
- Genus: Ypsolopha
- Species: Y. fujimotoi

Binomial name
- Ypsolopha fujimotoi Moriuti, 1964

Species of moth

Ypsolopha fujimotoi is a moth of the family Ypsolophidae. It is known from Japan.

The wingspan is about 25 mm.
