= Ypsolopha parallela =

Scientific classification
- Domain: Eukaryota
- Kingdom: Animalia
- Phylum: Arthropoda
- Class: Insecta
- Order: Lepidoptera
- Family: Ypsolophidae
- Genus: Ypsolopha
- Species: Y. parallela

Binomial name
- Ypsolopha parallela (Caradja, 1939)

Synonyms
- Cerostoma lucella var. parallela Caradja, 1939; Ypsolopha parallelus

Species of moth

Ypsolopha parallela is a moth of the family Ypsolophidae. It is known from Japan, Korea, China and Russia.

The wingspan is 20–24 mm.

The larvae feed on Quercus serrata.
