= Ypsolopha saitoi =

Scientific classification
- Kingdom: Animalia
- Phylum: Arthropoda
- Class: Insecta
- Order: Lepidoptera
- Family: Ypsolophidae
- Genus: Ypsolopha
- Species: Y. saitoi

Binomial name
- Ypsolopha saitoi Moriuti, 1964

Species of moth

Ypsolopha saitoi is a moth of the family Ypsolophidae. It is known from Japan.

The wingspan is 18–19 mm.
