= Ypsolopha satellitella =

Scientific classification
- Domain: Eukaryota
- Kingdom: Animalia
- Phylum: Arthropoda
- Class: Insecta
- Order: Lepidoptera
- Family: Ypsolophidae
- Genus: Ypsolopha
- Species: Y. satellitella

Binomial name
- Ypsolopha satellitella (Staudinger, 1871)

Synonyms
- Cerostoma satellitella Staudinger, 1871

Species of moth

Ypsolopha satellitella is a moth of the family Ypsolophidae, known from Turkmenistan, Kyrgyzstan, northwestern China, Afghanistan, the European part of Russia and Turkey. Its wingspan is 23–25 mm.
