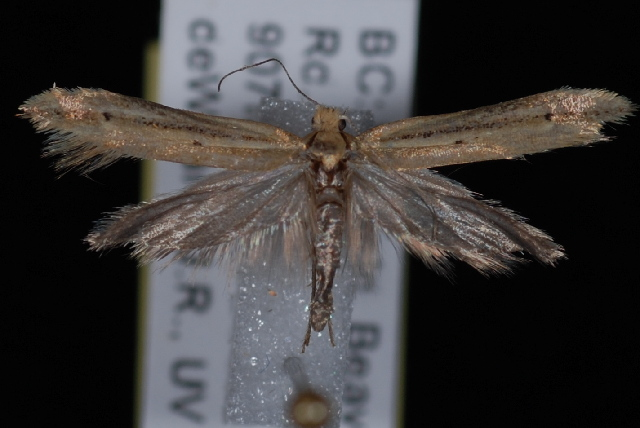

Scientific classification
- Kingdom: Animalia
- Phylum: Arthropoda
- Class: Insecta
- Order: Lepidoptera
- Family: Ypsolophidae
- Genus: Ypsolopha
- Species: Y. rubrella

Binomial name
- Ypsolopha rubrella (Dyar, 1902)

Synonyms
- Cerostoma rubrella Dyar, 1902

= Ypsolopha rubrella =

Species of moth

Ypsolopha rubrella is a moth of the family Ypsolophidae. It is found in the United States from California east to Colorado and Oklahoma.

The wingspan is about 18 mm.

The larvae feed on Berberis repens in Colorado and Berberis nervosa in coastal California.
