= Ypsolopha elongata =

Scientific classification
- Domain: Eukaryota
- Kingdom: Animalia
- Phylum: Arthropoda
- Class: Insecta
- Order: Lepidoptera
- Family: Ypsolophidae
- Genus: Ypsolopha
- Species: Y. elongata

Binomial name
- Ypsolopha elongata (Braun, 1925)

Synonyms
- Cerostoma elongata Braun, 1925

Species of moth

Ypsolopha elongata is a moth of the family Ypsolophidae. It is known from North America, including Utah.
