= Ypsolopha nella =

Scientific classification
- Kingdom: Animalia
- Phylum: Arthropoda
- Class: Insecta
- Order: Lepidoptera
- Family: Ypsolophidae
- Genus: Ypsolopha
- Species: Y. nella

Binomial name
- Ypsolopha nella (Dyar, 1903)

Synonyms
- Abebaea nella Dyar, 1903

Species of moth

Ypsolopha nella is a moth of the family Ypsolophidae. It is known from the United States, including Arizona and Utah.

The wingspan is about 21 mm.

The antennae are white with narrow sharp black annulations. The labial palpi are dark canary yellow and the short terminal joint light yellow. The face and head are whitish-yellow and the thorax is fawn brown. The forewings are fawn brown with a faint central streak running from the base to the middle of the cell. It is canary yellow and with apical part of costal edge touched with yellow. At the base, just above the yellow streak, start three narrow longitudinal lines of bluish-white scales, each of which has the central part black. At the end of the cell, the lower of these lines divides into several, following the apical veins. On the fold is a similar but not so well defined line of white black-spotted scales. The entire wing has strong violet reflections. The hindwings are rather dark purplish fuscous and the legs and underside of the body are golden white, sprinkled with black.

The larvae feed on Abies species.
