= Ypsolopha distinctata =

Scientific classification
- Kingdom: Animalia
- Phylum: Arthropoda
- Class: Insecta
- Order: Lepidoptera
- Family: Ypsolophidae
- Genus: Ypsolopha
- Species: Y. distinctata

Binomial name
- Ypsolopha distinctata Moriuti, 1977

Synonyms
- Ypsolopha distinctatus

Species of moth

Ypsolopha distinctata is a moth of the family Ypsolophidae. It is known from Japan.

The wingspan is 19–20 mm.
