= Dichomeris scenites =

Scientific classification
- Kingdom: Animalia
- Phylum: Arthropoda
- Class: Insecta
- Order: Lepidoptera
- Family: Gelechiidae
- Genus: Dichomeris
- Species: D. scenites

Binomial name
- Dichomeris scenites (Meyrick, 1909)

Synonyms
- Ypsolophus scenites Meyrick, 1909

Species of moth

Dichomeris scenites is a moth in the family Gelechiidae. It was described by Edward Meyrick in 1909. It is found in South Africa.

The wingspan is about 18 mm. The forewings are pale fuscous, with scattered dark fuscous scales and a short dark fuscous costal strigula before the middle. The second discal stigma is rather dark fuscous and indistinct. The hindwings are light grey, somewhat darker towards the apex.
