= Ypsolopha manella =

Scientific classification
- Kingdom: Animalia
- Phylum: Arthropoda
- Class: Insecta
- Order: Lepidoptera
- Family: Ypsolophidae
- Genus: Ypsolopha
- Species: Y. manella

Binomial name
- Ypsolopha manella (Dyar, 1902)

Synonyms
- Cerostoma manella Dyar, 1902

Species of moth

Ypsolopha manella is a moth of the family Ypsolophidae. It is known from the United States, including Utah and California.
