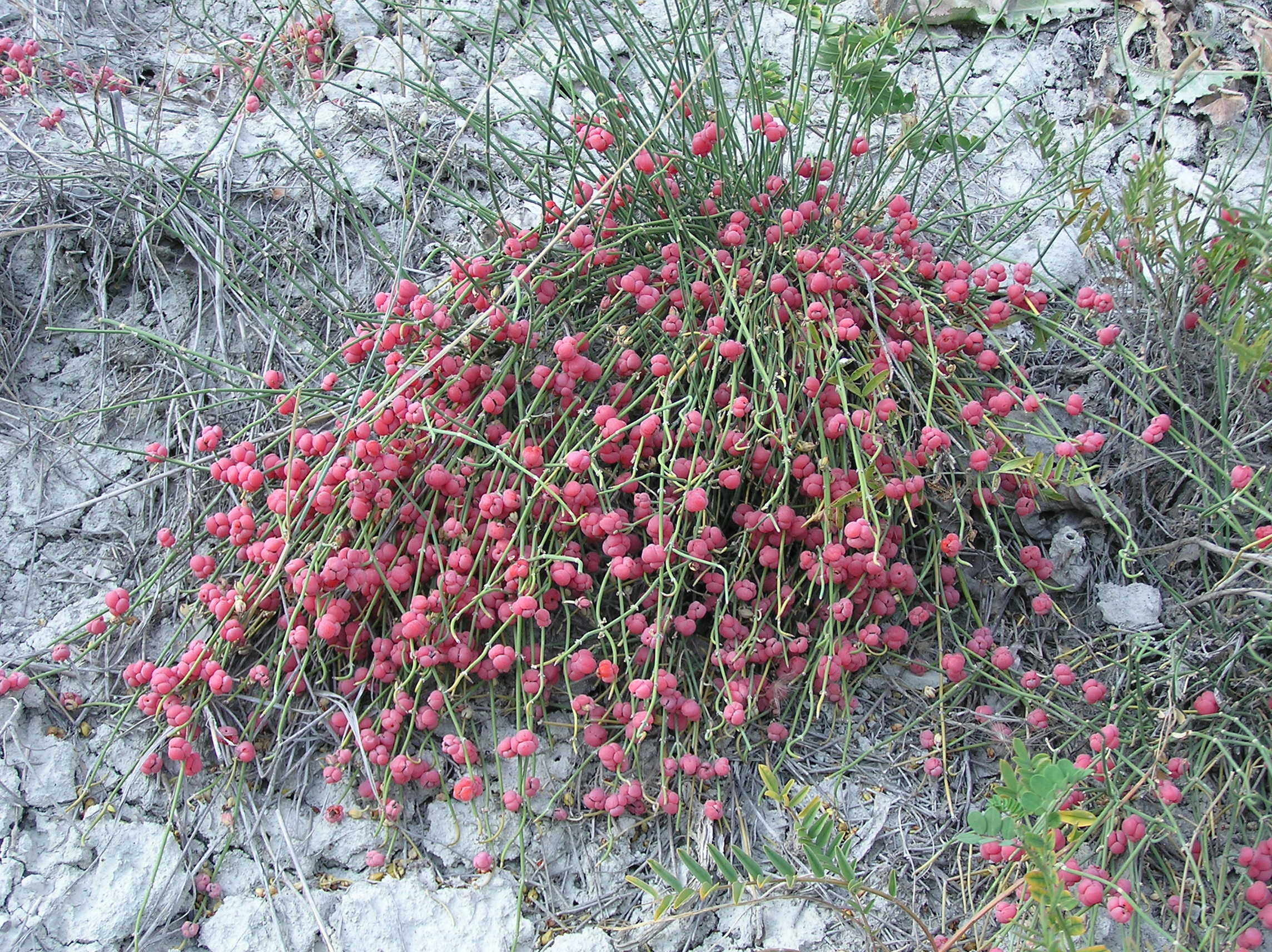

Conservation status
- Least Concern (IUCN 3.1)

Scientific classification
- Kingdom: Plantae
- Clade: Tracheophytes
- Clade: Gymnospermae
- Division: Gnetophyta
- Class: Gnetopsida
- Order: Ephedrales
- Family: Ephedraceae
- Genus: Ephedra
- Species: E. distachya

Binomial name
- Ephedra distachya L.

Synonyms
- Chaetocladus distachys (L.) J.Nelson; Ephedra monostachya L.; Ephedra polygonoides Pall. 1815 not Siev. 1796; Ephedra vulgaris Rich., illegitimate name; Ephedra minor Host; Ephedra botryoides Fisch.; Ephedra media C.A.Mey.; Ephedra subtristachya C.A.Mey.; Ephedra arborea Lag. ex Bertol.; Ephedra clusii Dufour; Ephedra macrocephala Bertol.; Ephedra maritima St.-Lag.; Ephedra dubia Regel; Ephedra podostylax Boiss.; Ephedra linnaei Stapf ex Koehne; Ephedra helvetica C.A.Mey.; Ephedra rigida St.-Lag.; Ephedra negrii Nouviant

= Ephedra distachya =

Species of seed-bearing shrub

Ephedra distachya is a shrub in the family Ephedraceae that stands about 25 cm to 50 cm high. The shrub grows in many parts of the world, including southern and central Europe and western and central Asia. Its local names include somlatha. Ephedra distachya lives on grey dunes which are fixed and stable sand dunes that are covered in continuous vegetation.

== Subspecies ==
1. Ephedra distachya subsp. distachya – central + southern Europe, southwestern + central Asia
2. Ephedra distachya subsp. helvetica (C.A.Mey.) Asch. & Graebn. – Switzerland, France, Italy, Slovenia, Austria

== History ==
Ephedra is part of a group of plants called ‘gnetophytes’. These plants have hardly changed in the past 100 million years, and are thought to be relics of an ancient flora. The leaves of Ephedra are tiny and scale-like. Gnetophyte leaves evolved independently from leaves in flowering plants. Ephedra produces the alkaloid ephedrine, which has been shown to interfere with insect thermoregulation and may also have effects on insect neurotransmitters. This may be the method by which the plant deters insect herbivores.

== Uses ==
Ephedra distachya is used to relieve acute muscular and rheumatic pains (when it is called teamsters' tea), as a stimulant, and in the cardio tonics in Ayurveda. It is sometimes identified with the legendary drug soma, as described in the Avesta and the Rig Veda, the respective ancient sacred texts of the Zoroastrian and Hindu faiths.

Ephedrine, an alkaloid, is obtained from its dried branches and is used as a stimulant, often to control asthma. It was isolated from the plant by Nagayoshi Nagai in 1885. All parts of the plant contain up to 3% ephedrine.

== Side effects ==
Although Ephedra has many benefits, it has side effects including insomnia and a fast heart rate.

== Gallery ==
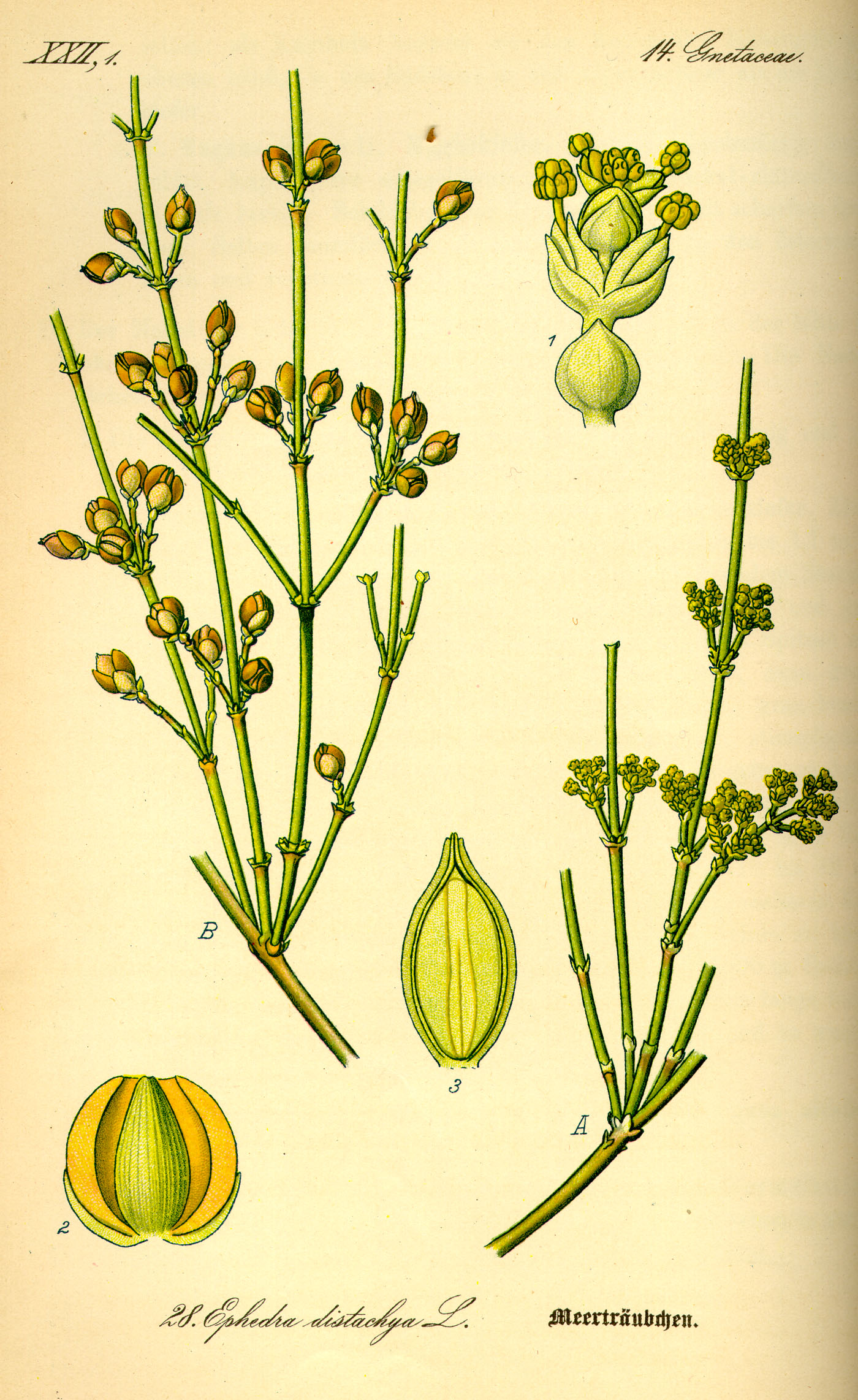
Botanical illustration.

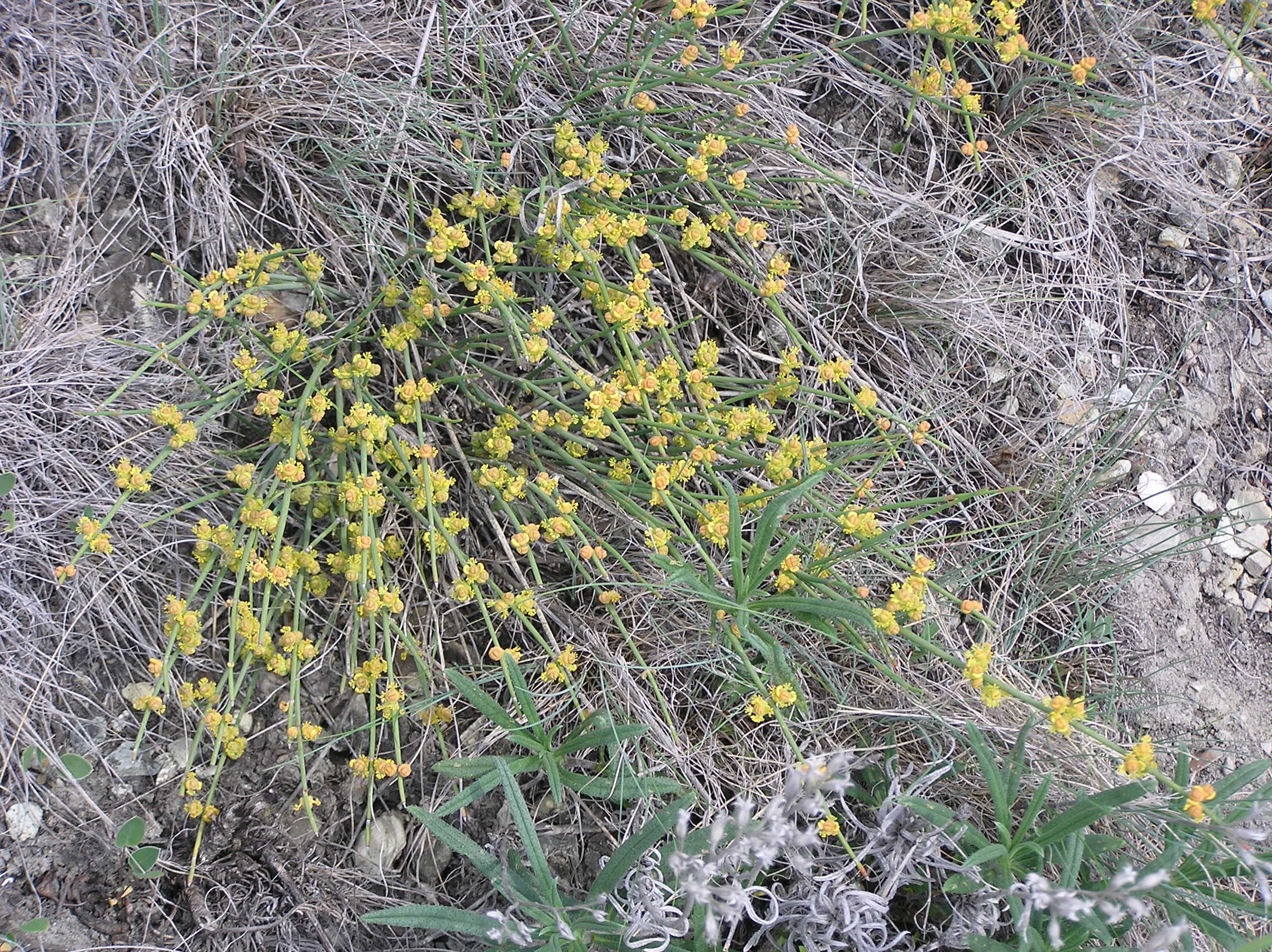
Male plant in bloom.

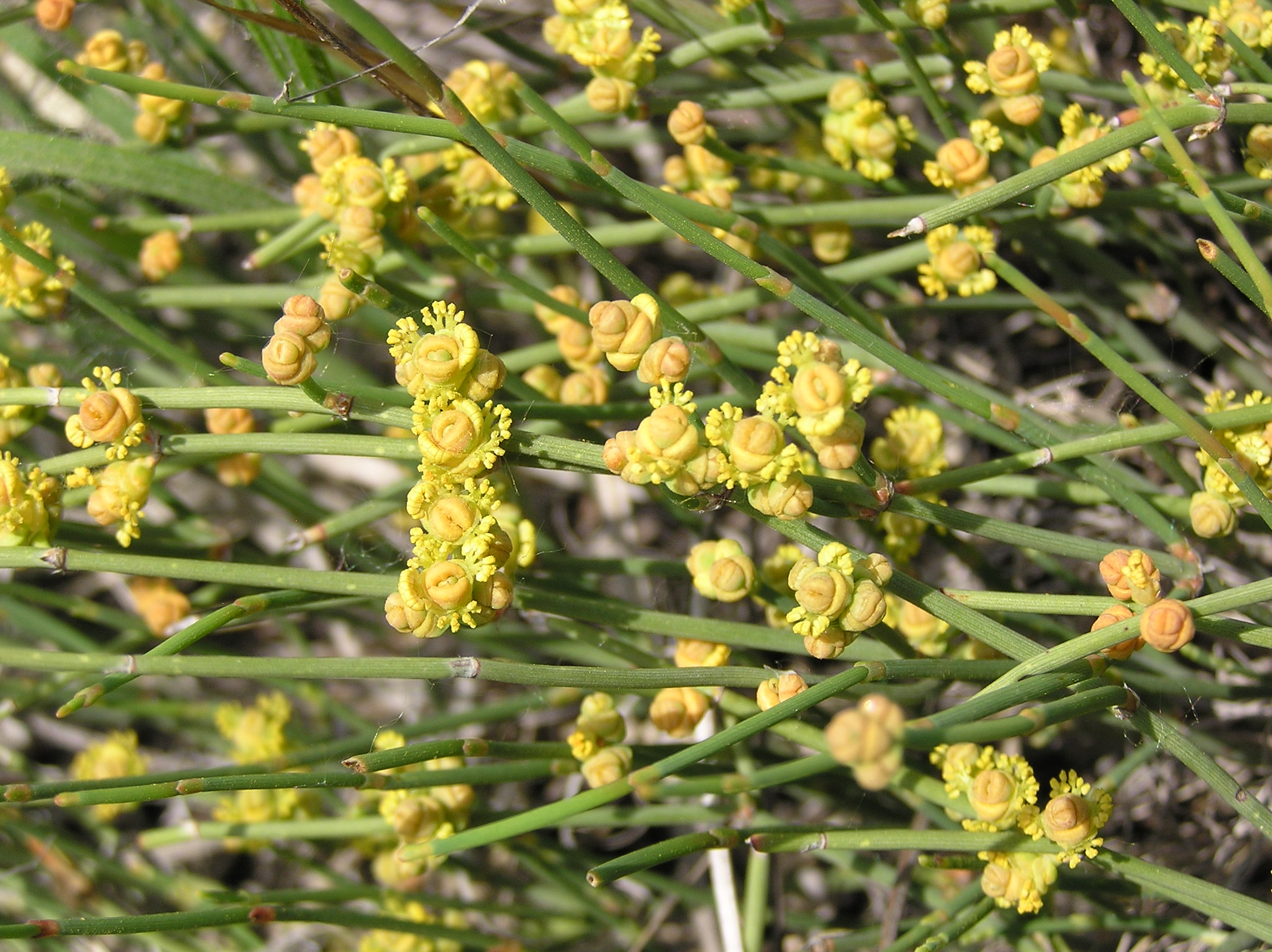
Pollen cones.

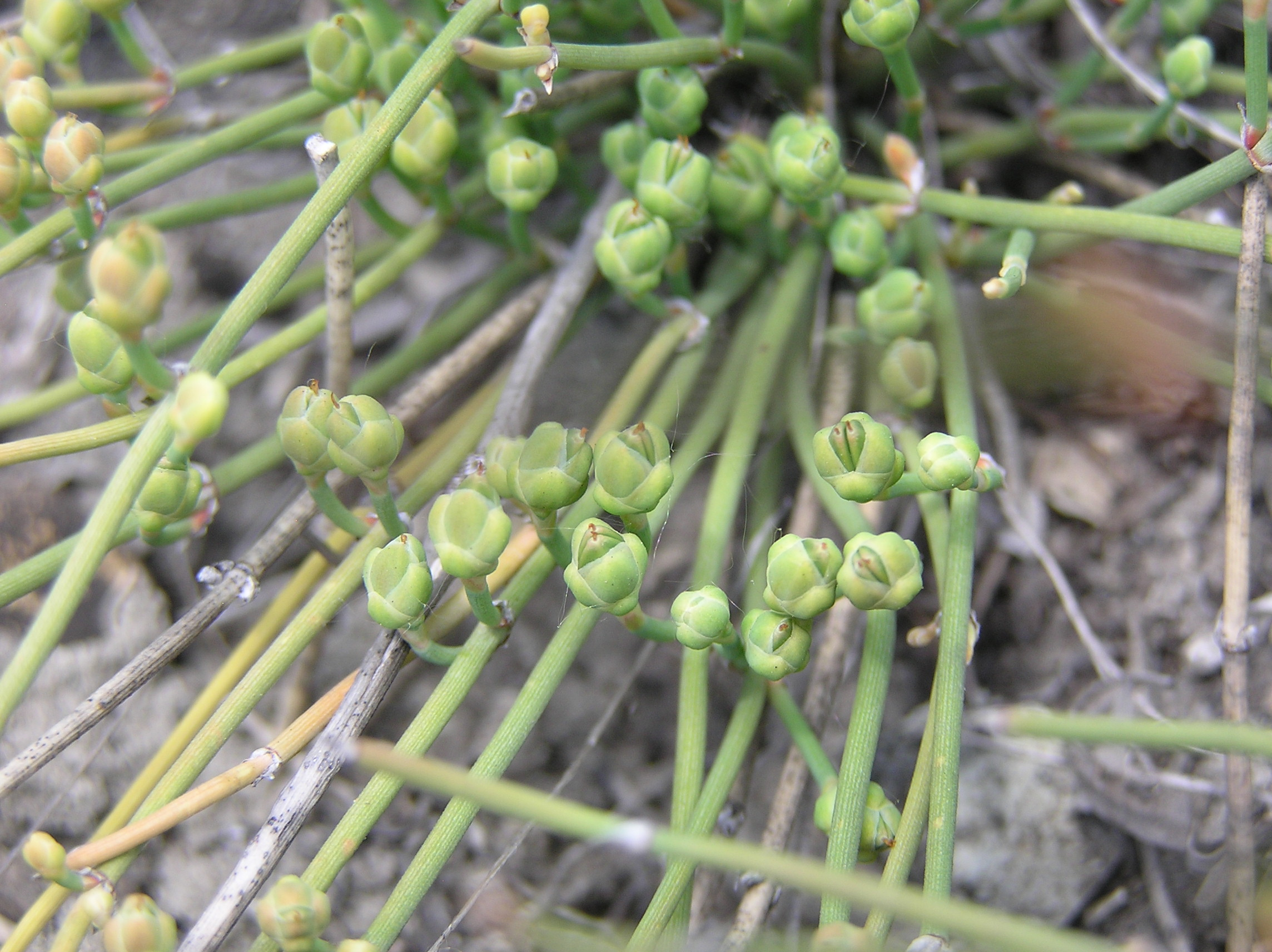
Female cones.

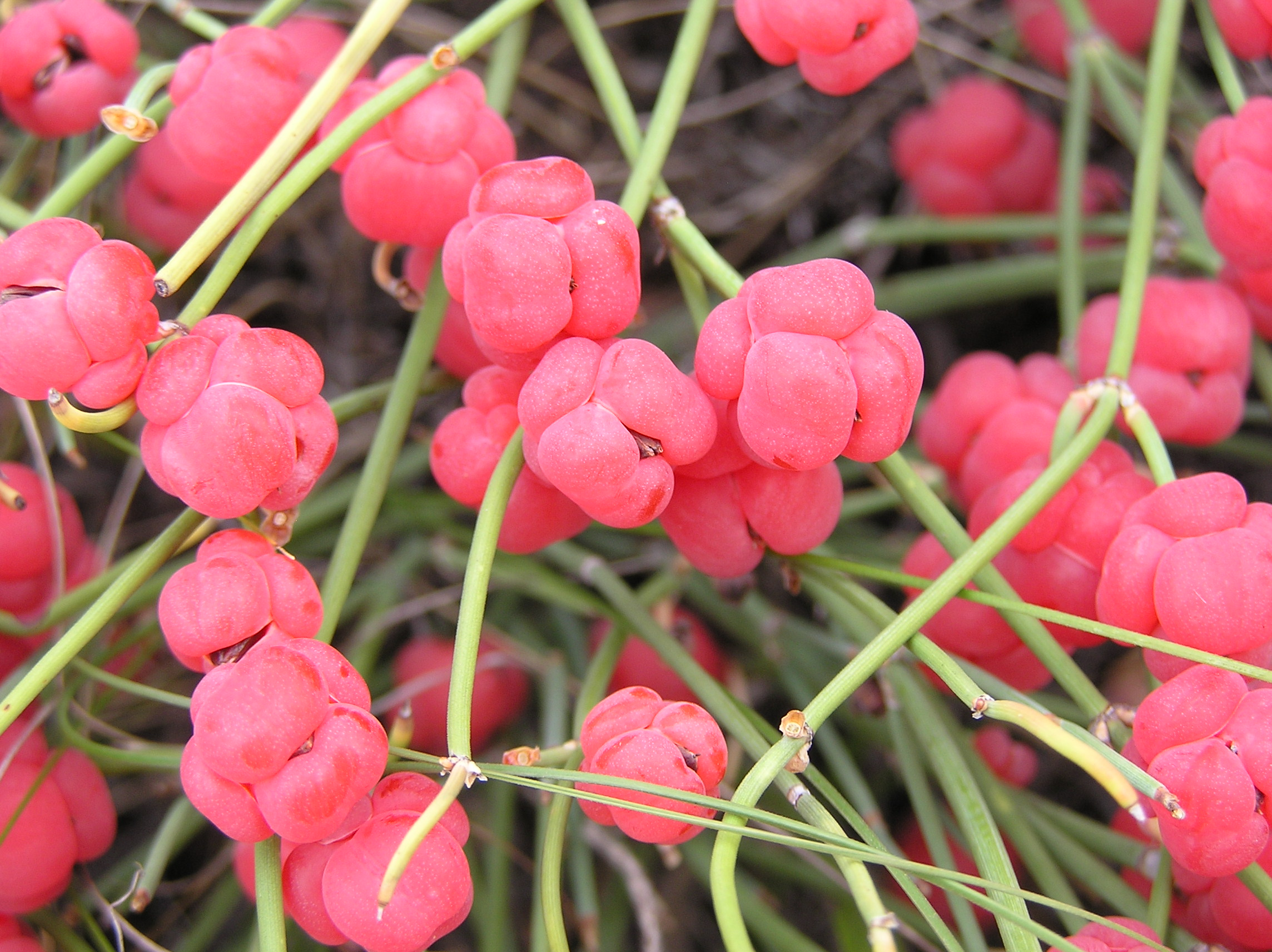
Ripe cones with seeds.

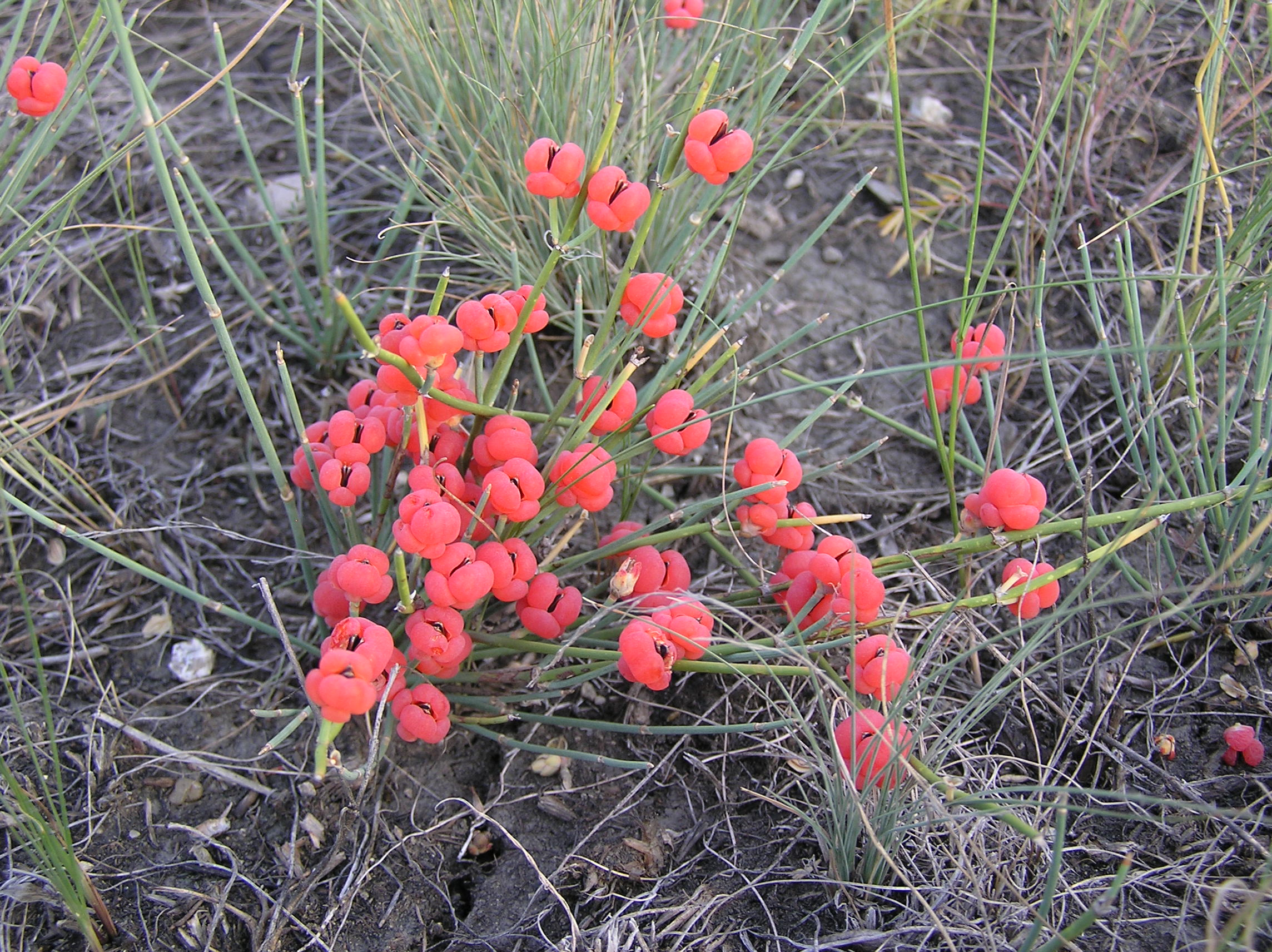
Female plant with ripe cones.

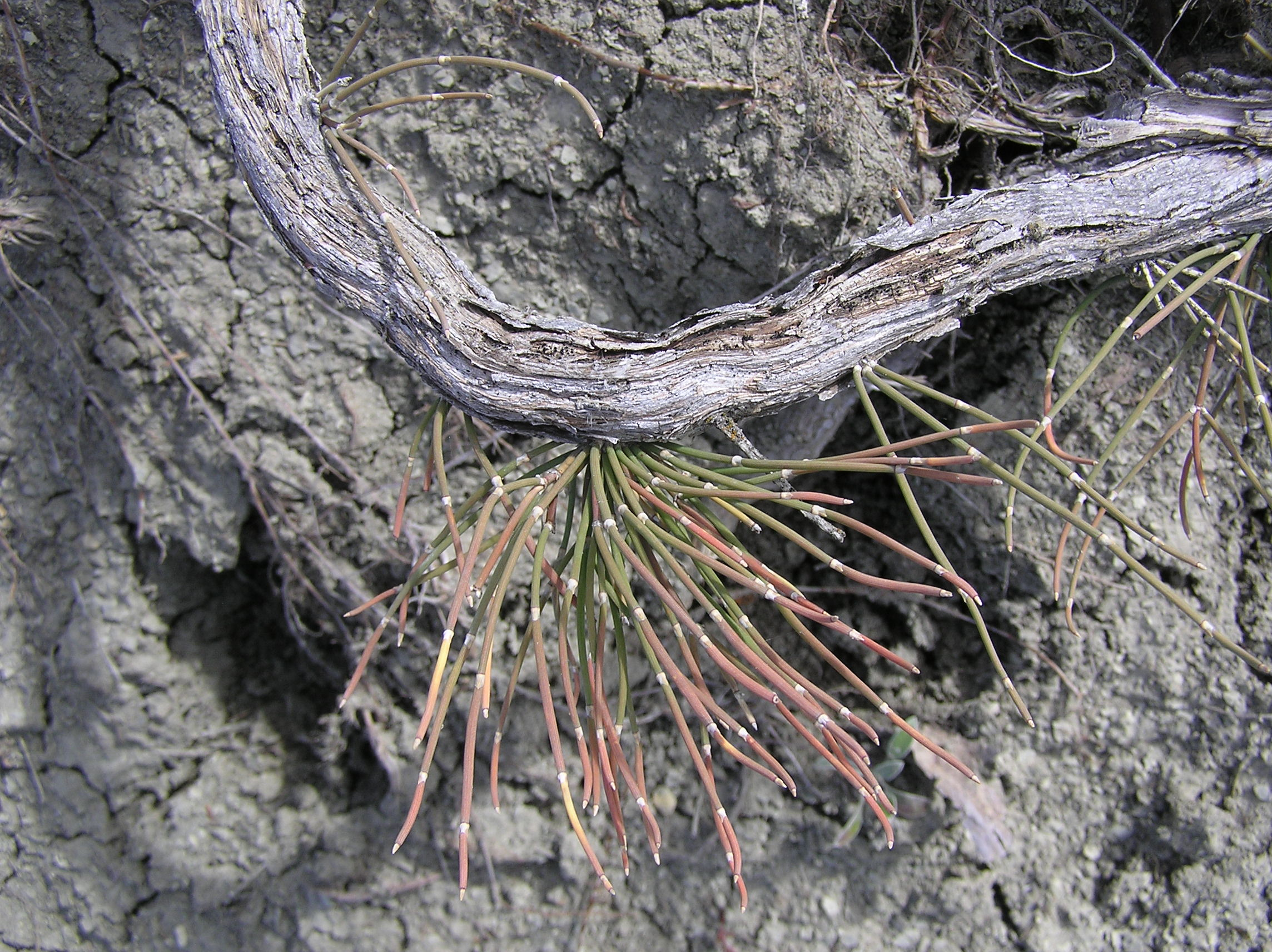
Rhizome and bark.
