= List of moths of North America (MONA 2312–2700.1) =

North American moths represent about 12,000 types of moths. In comparison, there are about 825 species of North American butterflies. The moths (mostly nocturnal) and butterflies (mostly diurnal) together make up the taxonomic order Lepidoptera.

This list is sorted on MONA number (MONA is short for Moths of America North of Mexico). A numbering system for North American moths introduced by Ronald W. Hodges, et al. in 1983 in the publication Check List of the Lepidoptera of America North of Mexico. The list has since been updated, but the placement in families is outdated for some species.

This list covers America north of Mexico (effectively the continental United States and Canada). For a list of moths and butterflies recorded from the state of Hawaii, see List of Lepidoptera of Hawaii.

This is a partial list, covering moths with MONA numbers ranging from 2312 to 2700.1. For the rest of the list, see List of moths of North America.

== Copromorphoidea and Alucitidae ==
- 2312 – Lotisma trigonana
- 2313 – Alucita montana, six-plume moth
- 2313.1 – Alucita adriendenisi
- 2313.2 – Alucita lalannei
- 2314 – Carposina sasakii, peach fruit moth
- 2315 – Carposina fernaldana, currant fruitworm moth
- 2316 – Carposina simulator
- 2317 – Carposina biloba
- 2318 – Bondia comonana
- 2319 – Bondia crescentella
- 2320 – Bondia shastana
- 2321 – Bondia spicata
- 2322 – Bondia fidelis
- 2323 – Bondia fuscata
- 2324 – Tesuquea hawleyana

== Epermeniidae ==
- 2325 – Epermenia imperialella
- no number yet – Epermenia falcata
- no number yet – Epermenia canadensis
- 2326 – Epermenia stolidota
- 2327 – Epermenia californica
- 2328 – Epermenia albapunctella
- 2329 – Epermenia cicutaella
- 2330 – Epermenia pimpinella
- 2331 – Epermenia lomatii
- 2332 – Epermenia infracta
- 2334 – Ochromolopis ramapoella
- 2335 – Parochromolopis floridana

== Yponomeutoidea ==
- 2336 – Abrenthia cuprea
- 2336.1 – Neomachlotica spiraea
- 2336.2 – Drymoana blanchardi
- 2336.3 – Glyphipterix floridensis
- 2337 – Glyphipterix circumscriptella
- 2337.1 – Glyphipterix brauni
- 2338 – Glyphipterix quadragintapunctata
- 2338.1 – Glyphipterix powelli
- 2338.2 – Glyphipterix urticae
- 2339 – Glyphipterix bifasciata
- 2339.1 – Glyphipterix hypenantia
- 2339.2 – Glyphipterix yosemitella
- 2340 – Glyphipterix unifasciata
- 2341 – Glyphipterix haworthana, Haworth's glyphipterid moth
- 2341.1 – Glyphipterix sistes
- 2342 – Glyphipterix californiae
- 2342.1 – Glyphipterix feniseca
- 2342.2 – Glyphipterix juncivora
- 2342.3 – Glyphipterix sierranevadae
- 2342.4 – Glyphipterix arizonensis
- 2342.5 – Glyphipterix roenastes
- 2343 – Glyphipterix saurodonta
- 2344 – Glyphipterix montisella
- 2344.1 – Glyphipterix chiricahuae
- 2344.2 – Glyphipterix hodgesi
- 2344.3 – Glyphipterix cherokee
- 2344.4 – Glyphipterix chambersi
- 2344.5 – Glyphipterix flavimaculata
- 2344.6 – Glyphipterix melanoscirta
- 2344.7 – Glyphipterix santaritae
- 2344.8 – Glyphipterix ruidosensis
- 2344.9 – Glyphipterix nordini
- 2345 – Diploschizia lanista
- 2345.1 – Diploschizia minimella
- 2345.2 – Diploschizia kutisi
- 2345.3 – Diploschizia seminolensis
- 2345.4 – Diploschizia habecki
- 2345.5 – Diploschizia regia
- 2346 – Diploschizia impigritella, yellow nutsedge moth
- 2346.1 – Diploschizia kimballi
- 2347 – Araeolepia subfasciella
- 2348 – Ellabella editha
- 2349 – Ellabella melanoclista
- 2349.1 – Ellabella bayensis
- 2349.2 – Ellabella johnstoni
- 2350 – Eucalantica polita
- 2350.1 – Eucalantica vaquero
- 2351 – Euceratia castella
- 2352 – Euceratia securella
- 2353 – Homadaula anisocentra, mimosa webworm moth
- 2354 – Ypsolopha heteraula
- 2355 – Pliniaca bakerella
- 2356 – Pliniaca sparsisquamella
- 2357 – Plutella albidorsella
- 2358 – Plutella armoraciae
- 2358.1 – Plutella haasi
- 2359 – Eidophasia dammersi
- 2360 – Rhigognostis interrupta
- 2361 – Plutella notabilis
- 2362 – Plutella omissa
- 2362.1 – Plutella polaris
- 2363 – Plutella porrectella, dame's violet moth
- 2364 – Rhigognostis poulella
- 2365 – Plutella vanella
- 2366 – Plutella xylostella, diamondback moth
- 2367 – Ypsolopha aleutianella
- 2368 – Ypsolopha angelicella
- 2369 – Ypsolopha arizonella
- 2370 – Ypsolopha barberella
- 2370.1 – Ypsolopha buscki
- 2371 – Ypsolopha canariella, canary ypsolopha moth
- 2372 – Ypsolopha cervella
- 2373 – Ypsolopha cockerella
- 2374 – Ypsolopha delicatella
- 2375 – Ypsolopha dentella, European honeysuckle moth
- 2376 – Ypsolopha dentiferella
- 2377 – Ypsolopha dorsimaculella
- 2378 – Ypsolopha electropa
- 2379 – Ypsolopha elongata
- 2380 – Ypsolopha falciferella
- 2381 – Ypsolopha flavistrigella
- 2382 – Ypsolopha frustella
- 2383 – Ypsolopha gerdanella
- 2384 – Ypsolopha leptaula
- 2385 – Ypsolopha lyonothamnae
- 2386 – Ypsolopha maculatella
- 2387 – Ypsolopha manella
- 2388 – Ypsolopha nella
- 2389 – Ypsolopha oliviella
- 2390 – Ypsolopha querciella
- 2391 – Ypsolopha rubrella
- 2392 – Ypsolopha senex
- 2393 – Ypsolopha schwarziella
- 2394 – Ypsolopha striatella
- 2395 – Ypsolopha sublucella
- 2396 – Ypsolopha undulatella
- 2397 – Ypsolopha unicipunctella
- 2398 – Ypsolopha ustella, variable ypsolopha moth
- 2399 – Ypsolopha vintrella
- 2400 – Ypsolopha walsinghamiella
- 2401 – Atteva aurea, ailanthus webworm moth
- 2402 – Eucatagma amyrisella
- 2403 – Lactura atrolinea
- 2404 – Lactura basistriga
- 2405 – Lactura pupula, bumelia leafworm moth
- 2406 – Lactura psammitis
- 2407 – Lactura subfervens
- 2408 – Lactura rhodocentra
- 2409 – Ocnerostoma piniariella
- 2410 – Ocnerostoma strobivorum
- 2411 – Atemelia aetherias
- 2412 – Podiasa chiococcella
- 2413 – Swammerdamia caesiella
- 2414 – Swammerdamia pyrella, rufous-tipped swammerdamia moth
- 2414.1 – Swammerdamia beirnei
- 2414.2 – Swammerdamia lutarea
- 2415 – Urodus parvula, bumelia webworm moth
- 2415.1 – Wockia asperipunctella
- 2416 – Yponomeuta atomocella, hop-tree ermine moth
- 2417 – Yponomeuta euonymella
- 2418 – Yponomeuta leucothorax
- 2419 – Yponomeuta martinella
- 2420 – Yponomeuta multipunctella, American ermine moth
- 2421 – Yponomeuta padella, orchard ermine moth
- 2421.1 – Yponomeuta malinellus, apple ermine moth
- 2422 – Yponomeuta plumbella, large-spot ermine moth
- 2423 – Yponomeuta semialbus
- 2423.1 – Yponomeuta cagnagella, spindle ermine moth
- 2424 – Zelleria arizonica
- 2425 – Kessleria celastrusella
- 2426 – Euhyponomeutoides gracilariella
- 2427 – Zelleria haimbachi, pine needle sheathminer moth
- 2428 – Zelleria ochroplagiata
- 2429 – Kessleria parnassiae
- 2430 – Zelleria pyri
- 2431 – Zelleria retiniella
- 2432 – Zelleria semitincta
- 2433 – Argyresthia abies
- 2434 – Argyresthia affinis
- 2435 – Argyresthia alternatella
- 2436 – Argyresthia altissimella
- 2437 – Argyresthia annettella
- 2438 – Argyresthia apicimaculella
- 2439 – Argyresthia arceuthobiella
- 2440 – Argyresthia aureoargentella
- 2441 – Argyresthia austerella
- 2442 – Argyresthia belangerella
- 2443 – Argyresthia bolliella
- 2444 – Argyresthia calliphanes
- 2445 – Argyresthia canadensis
- 2446 – Argyresthia castaneella
- 2447 – Argyresthia chalcochrysa
- 2448 – Argyresthia columbia
- 2449 – Argyresthia conjugella, apple fruit moth
- 2450 – Argyresthia cupressella
- 2451 – Argyresthia deletella
- 2452 – Argyresthia eugeniella, guava fruit moth
- 2453 – Argyresthia franciscella
- 2454 – Argyresthia flexilis
- 2455 – Argyresthia freyella
- 2456 – Argyresthia furcatella
- 2457 – Argyresthia goedartella, bronze alder moth
- 2458 – Argyresthia inscriptella
- 2459 – Argyresthia laricella, larch shoot moth
- 2460 – Argyresthia libocedrella
- 2461 – Argyresthia mariana
- 2462 – Argyresthia media
- 2463 – Argyresthia mesocausta
- 2464 – Argyresthia monochromella
- 2465 – Argyresthia montella
- 2466 – Argyresthia nymphocoma
- 2467 – Argyresthia oreasella, cherry shoot borer moth
- 2468 – Argyresthia pallidella
- 2469 – Argyresthia pedmontella
- 2470 – Argyresthia picea
- 2471 – Argyresthia pilatella
- 2472 – Argyresthia plicipunctella
- 2473 – Argyresthia pseudotsuga
- 2474 – Argyresthia pygmaeella
- 2475 – Argyresthia quadristrigella
- 2476 – Argyresthia quercicolella
- 2477 – Argyresthia rileiella
- 2478 – Argyresthia ruidosa
- 2479 – Argyresthia subreticulata, speckled argyresthia moth
- 2480 – Argyresthia thoracella
- 2481 – Argyresthia thuiella, arborvitae leafminer moth
- 2482 – Argyresthia trifasciae
- 2483 – Argyresthia tsuga
- 2484 – Argyresthia undulatella
- 2485 – Tinagma giganteum
- 2485.1 – Tinagma brunneofasciatum
- 2485.2 – Tinagma powelli
- 2485.3 – Tinagma californicum
- 2485.4 – Tinagma gaedikei
- 2487 – Tinagma obscurofasciella
- 2488 – Tinagma ochremaculella
- 2489 – Tinagma pulverilinea
- 2489.1 – Digitivalva clarkei
- 2490 – Acrolepiopsis incertella, carrionflower moth
- 2490.1 – Acrolepiopsis heppneri
- 2490.2 – Acrolepiopsis californica
- 2491 – Acrolepiopsis leucoscia
- 2492 – Acrolepiopsis reticulosa
- 2492.1 – Acrolepiopsis assectella
- 2493 – Cycloplasis panicifoliella
- 2493.1 – Cycloplasis immaculata
- 2494 – Scelorthus pisoniella
- 2495 – Lamprolophus lithella
- 2496 – Embola albaciliella
- 2496.1 – Embola autumnalis
- 2497 – Aetole bella
- 2497.1 – Aetole prenticei
- 2497.2 – Aetole schulzella
- 2497.3 – Aetole cera
- 2497.4 – Aetole favonia
- 2497.5 – Aetole aprica
- 2498 – Embola ciccella
- 2498.1 – Embola cyanozostera
- 2499 – Aetole extraneella
- 2500 – Embola ionis
- 2500.1 – Embola powelli
- 2502 – Neoheliodines nyctaginella
- 2502.1 – Neoheliodines cliffordi
- 2502.2 – Neoheliodines albidentus
- 2502.3 – Neoheliodines arizonense
- 2502.4 – Neoheliodines eurypterus
- 2502.5 – Neoheliodines hodgesi
- 2502.6 – Neoheliodines melanobasilarus
- 2502.7 – Neoheliodines vernius
- 2504 – Embola sexpunctella
- 2504.1 – Euheliodines chemsaki
- 2505 – Aetole tripunctella
- 2506 – Aetole unipunctella
- 2507 – Schreckensteinia erythriella
- 2508 – Schreckensteinia felicella
- 2509 – Schreckensteinia festaliella, blackberry skeletonizer moth
- 2510 – Lithariapteryx abroniaeella
- 2511 – Lithariapteryx jubarella
- 2512 – Lithariapteryx mirabilinella
- 2512.1 – Lithariapteryx elegans

== Sesiidae ==
- 2513 – Pennisetia marginatum, raspberry crown borer moth
- 2513.1 – Sophona greenfieldi
- 2513.2 – Sophona snellingi
- 2514 – Zenodoxus canescens
- 2515 – Zenodoxus heucherae
- 2516 – Zenodoxus maculipes
- 2517 – Zenodoxus mexicanus
- 2518 – Zenodoxus palmii
- 2519 – Zenodoxus rubens
- 2520 – Zenodoxus sidalceae
- 2521 – Cissuvora ampelopsis
- 2522 – Paranthrene asilipennis, oak clearwing moth
- 2523 – Paranthrene dollii, poplar clearwing moth
- 2524 – Paranthrene tabaniformis, European poplar clearwing moth
- 2525 – Paranthrene fenestrata
- 2526 – Paranthrene robiniae, western poplar clearwing moth
- 2527 – Paranthrene simulans, red oak clearwing moth
- 2527.1 – Paranthrene pellucida, pin oak clearwing moth
- 2528 – Vitacea admiranda
- 2529 – Vitacea cupressi
- 2530 – Vitacea polistiformis, grape root borer moth
- 2531 – Vitacea scepsiformis, lesser grape root borer moth
- 2532 – Albuna fraxini, Virginia creeper clearwing moth
- 2533 – Albuna pyramidalis, fireweed clearwing moth
- 2533.5 – Tirista praxilla
- 2533.6 – Tirista argentifrons
- 2534 – Euhagena emphytiformis, gaura borer moth
- 2535 – Euhagena nebraskae, Nebraska clearwing moth
- 2536 – Melittia cucurbitae, squash vine borer moth
- 2537 – Melittia calabaza
- 2538 W – Melittia snowii, clearwing borer moth
- 2539 – Melittia grandis
- 2540 – Melittia gloriosa, glorious squash vine borer moth
- 2541 – Melittia magnifica
- 2542 – Sesia apiformis, European hornet moth
- 2543 – Sesia tibiale, American hornet moth
- 2543.1 – Sesia spartani
- 2544 – Calasesia coccinea
- 2545 – Osminia ruficornis
- 2545.1 – Osminia donahueorum
- 2545.2 – Osminia bicornicolis
- 2546 – Synanthedon acerrubri, maple clearwing moth
- 2547 – Synanthedon geliformis, pecan bark borer moth
- 2548 – Synanthedon richardsi
- 2549 – Synanthedon scitula, dogwood borer moth
- 2550 – Synanthedon pictipes, lesser peachtree borer moth
- 2551 – Synanthedon rhododendri, rhododendron borer moth
- 2552 – Synanthedon rileyana, Riley's clearwing moth
- 2553 – Synanthedon tipuliformis, currant borer moth
- 2554 – Synanthedon acerni, maple callus borer moth
- 2555 – Synanthedon fatifera, lesser viburnum clearwing moth
- 2556 – Synanthedon viburni, viburnum clearwing moth
- 2557 – Synanthedon alleri
- 2558 – Synanthedon arctica
- 2559 – Synanthedon bolteri, northern willow clearwing moth
- 2560 – Synanthedon canadensis
- 2561 – Synanthedon culiciformis, large red-belted clearwing moth
- 2562 – Synanthedon dominicki
- 2563 – Synanthedon fulvipes
- 2564 – Synanthedon helenis
- 2565 – Synanthedon pyri, apple bark borer moth
- 2566 – Synanthedon refulgens, red-lined clearwing moth
- 2567 – Synanthedon rubrofascia, tupelo clearwing moth
- 2568 – Synanthedon saxifragae
- 2569 – Synanthedon sigmoidea, willow clearwing moth
- 2570 – Synanthedon albicornis, western willow clearwing moth
- 2571 – Synanthedon decipiens, oakgall borer moth
- 2572 – Synanthedon proxima, eastern willow clearwing moth
- 2573 – Synanthedon sapygaeformis, Florida oakgall moth
- 2574 – Synanthedon arizonensis
- 2575 – Synanthedon arkansasensis
- 2576 – Synanthedon bibionipennis, strawberry crown moth
- 2577 – Synanthedon castaneae, chestnut borer moth
- 2578 – Synanthedon chrysidipennis
- 2579 – Synanthedon kathyae, holly borer moth
- 2580 – Synanthedon mellinipennis, ceanothus borer moth
- 2581 – Synanthedon polygoni, buckwheat borer moth
- 2582 – Synanthedon resplendens, sycamore borer moth
- 2583 – Synanthedon exitiosa, peachtree borer moth
- 2584 – Synanthedon novaroensis, Douglas fir pitch moth
- 2585 – Synanthedon pini, pitch mass borer moth
- 2586 – Synanthedon sequoiae, sequoia pitch moth
- 2586.1 – Synanthedon myopaeformis, apple clearwing moth
- 2586.96 – Synanthedon n. sp., undescribed species
- 2587 – Palmia praecedens
- 2588 – Podosesia aureocincta, banded ash clearwing moth
- 2589 – Podosesia syringae, ash borer moth
- 2590 – Sannina uroceriformis, persimmon borer moth
- 2591 – Carmenta albociliata
- 2592 – Carmenta anthracipennis, blazing star clearwing moth
- 2593 – Carmenta apache
- 2594 – Carmenta arizonae
- 2594.1 – Carmenta armasata
- 2595 – Carmenta auritincta, Arizona clearwing moth
- 2596 – Carmenta bassiformis, ironweed clearwing moth
- 2597 – Carmenta corni
- 2598 – Carmenta engelhardti
- 2598.1 – Carmenta flaschkai
- 2599 – Carmenta giliae
- 2600 – Carmenta ithacae
- 2600.1 – Carmenta laurelae
- 2601 – Carmenta mariona
- 2602 W – Carmenta mimuli, coronopus borer moth
- 2603 – Carmenta odda
- 2604 – Carmenta ogalala
- 2605 – Carmenta pallene
- 2606 – Carmenta phoradendri, mistletoe borer moth
- 2607 – Carmenta prosopis, mesquite clearwing moth
- 2608 – Carmenta pyralidiformis, boneset borer moth
- 2609 – Carmenta querci
- 2610 – Carmenta rubricincta
- 2611 – Carmenta subaerea
- 2612 – Carmenta suffusata
- 2613 – Carmenta tecta
- 2614 – Carmenta texana, Texana clearwing moth
- 2615 – Carmenta verecunda
- 2615.1 – Carmenta wielgusi
- 2616 – Carmenta welchelorum
- 2617 – Carmenta wellerae
- 2617.1 – Carmenta tildeni
- 2618 – Penstemonia clarkei
- 2619 – Penstemonia dammersi
- 2620 – Penstemonia edwardsii, penstemon borer moth
- 2621 – Penstemonia hennei
- 2621.1 – Penstemonia pappi
- 2622 – Alcathoe carolinensis, clematis borer moth
- 2622.1 – Alcathoe autumnalis
- 2623 – Alcathoe caudata, clematis clearwing moth
- 2624 – Alcathoe pepsioides
- 2625 – Alcathoe verrugo
- 2626 – Hymenoclea palmii, burrowbush borer moth
- 2626.1 – Phormoestes palmettovora
- 2626.2 – Chamaesphecia hungarica
- 2626.3 – Chamaesphecia tenthrediniformis
- 2626.4 – Chamaesphecia crassicornis

== Choreutidae ==
- 2627 – Brenthia pavonacella, peacock brenthia moth
- 2628 – Anthophila alpinella
- 2629 – Prochoreutis inflatella, skullcap skeletonizer moth
- 2630 – Prochoreutis sororculella
- 2631 – Prochoreutis dyarella
- 2632 – Prochoreutis extrincicella
- 2633 – Prochoreutis pernivalis
- 2634 – Caloreas apocynoglossa
- 2635 – Caloreas occidentella
- 2636 – Caloreas coloradella
- 2637 – Caloreas caliginosa
- 2638 – Caloreas schausiella
- 2639 – Caloreas augustella
- 2640 – Caloreas multimarginata
- 2640.1 – Caloreas melanifera
- 2641 – Caloreas leucobasis
- 2642 – Tebenna silphiella, rosinweed moth
- 2643 – Tebenna balsamorrhizella
- 2644 – Tebenna gemmalis
- 2645 – Tebenna immutabilis
- 2646 – Tebenna piperella
- 2647 – Tebenna gnaphaliella, everlasting tebbena moth
- 2648 – Tebenna onustana
- 2649 – Tebenna carduiella
- 2650 – Choreutis pariana, apple leaf skeletonizer moth
- 2651 – Choreutis diana, Diana's choreutis moth
- 2652 – Choreutis betuliperda
- 2652.1 – Choreutis myllerana
- 2653 – Tortyra slossonia, Slosson's metalmark moth
- 2653.1 – Tortyra iocyaneus
- 2654 – Hemerophila dyari
- 2655 – Hemerophila diva, diva hemerophila moth

== Cossidae ==
- 2656 – Hypopta palmata
- 2657 – Inguromorpha itzalana
- 2658 – Inguromorpha arcifera
- 2659 – Inguromorpha basalis, black-lined carpenterworm moth
- 2660 – Givira mucida
- 2661 – Givira arbeloides
- 2662 – Givira theodori
- 2663 – Givira durangona
- 2664 – Givira carla
- 2665 – Givira cornelia
- 2666 – Givira lucretia
- 2667 – Givira ethela
- 2668 – Givira anna, anna carpenterworm moth
- 2669 – Givira marga
- 2670 – Givira lotta, pine carpenterworm moth
- 2671 – Givira francesca
- 2672 – Givira minuta
- 2673 – Givira cleopatra
- 2674 – Cossula magnifica, pecan carpenterworm moth
- 2675 – Acossus centerensis, poplar carpenterworm moth
- 2676 – Acossus populi, aspen carpenterworm moth
- 2677 – Acossus undosus
- 2678 – Fania connecta
- 2679 – Comadia henrici
- 2680 – Comadia suaedivora, alkali blite borer moth
- 2681 – Comadia dolli
- 2682 – Comadia intrusa
- 2683 – Comadia arenae
- 2684 – Comadia subterminata
- 2685 – Comadia sperata
- 2686 – Comadia bertholdi, lupine borer moth
- 2687 – Comadia alleni
- 2688 – Comadia manfredi
- 2689 – Comadia redtenbacheri
- 2690 – Comadia albistriga
- 2691 – Fania nanus
- 2692 – Prionoxystus piger, baccharis carpenterworm moth
- 2693 – Prionoxystus robiniae, carpenterworm moth
- 2694 – Prionoxystus macmurtrei, little carpenterworm moth
- 2695 – Miacora perplexa
- 2696 – Miacora luzena
- 2697 – Aramos ramosa
- 2698 – Hamilcara atra
- 2699 – Psychonoctua gilensis
- 2699.1 – Psychonoctua masoni
- 2700 – Zeuzera pyrina, leopard moth
- 2700.1 – Morpheis clenchi

== See also ==
- List of butterflies of North America
- List of Lepidoptera of Hawaii
- List of moths of Canada
- List of butterflies of Canada
