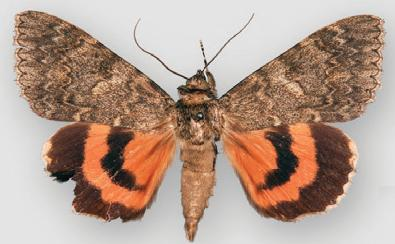

Scientific classification
- Kingdom: Animalia
- Phylum: Arthropoda
- Class: Insecta
- Order: Lepidoptera
- Superfamily: Noctuoidea
- Family: Erebidae
- Genus: Catocala
- Species: C. francisca

Binomial name
- Catocala francisca H. Edwards, 1880

Synonyms
- Catocala mariana francesca

= Catocala francisca =

Species of moth

Catocala francisca or Catocala hermia francisca is a moth of the family Erebidae. It is found in California.

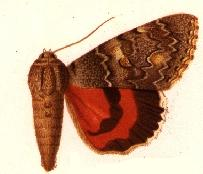
Illustration

Adults are on wing from June to September depending on the location. There is probably one generation per year.
