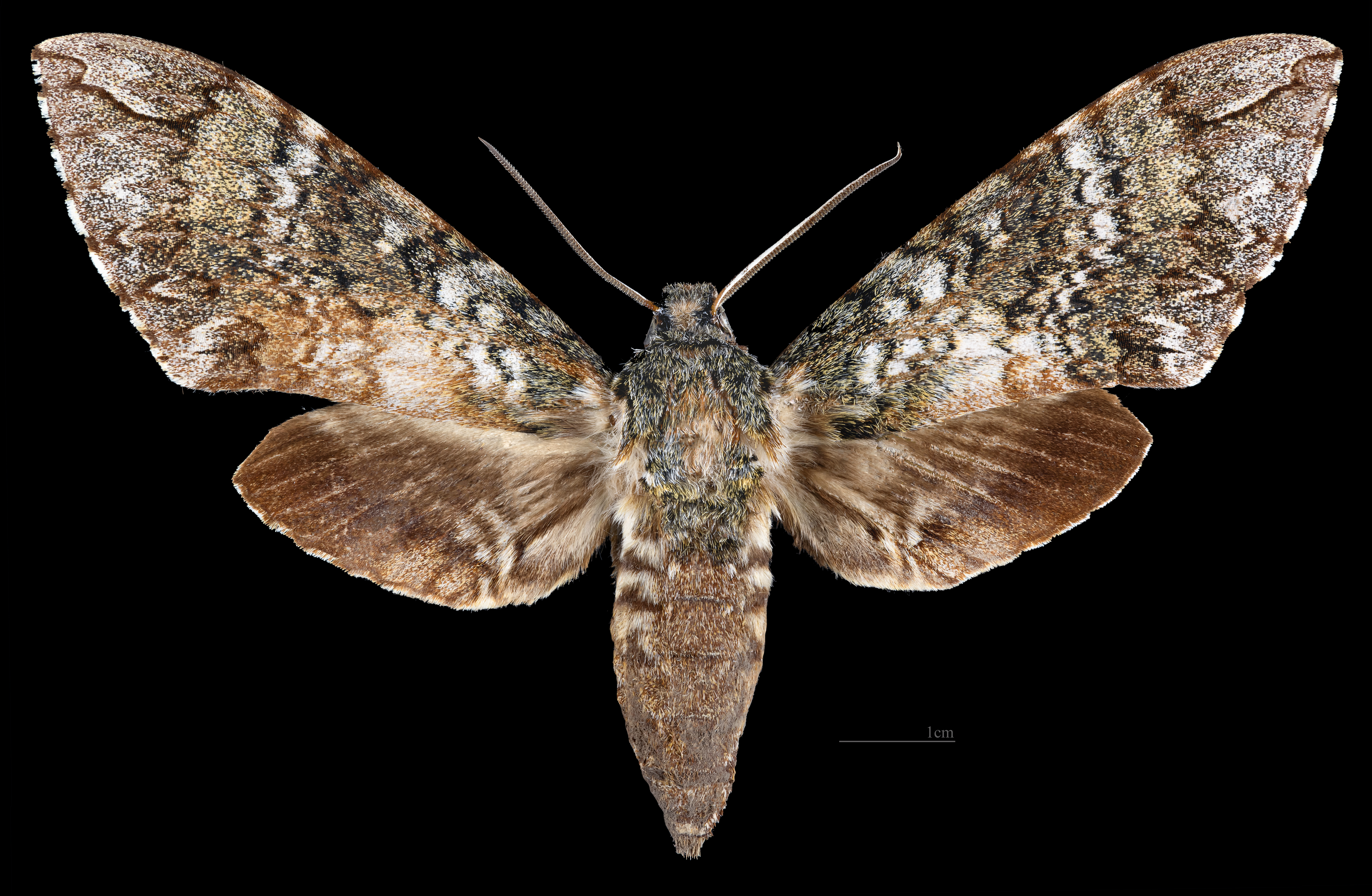
- Female dorsal
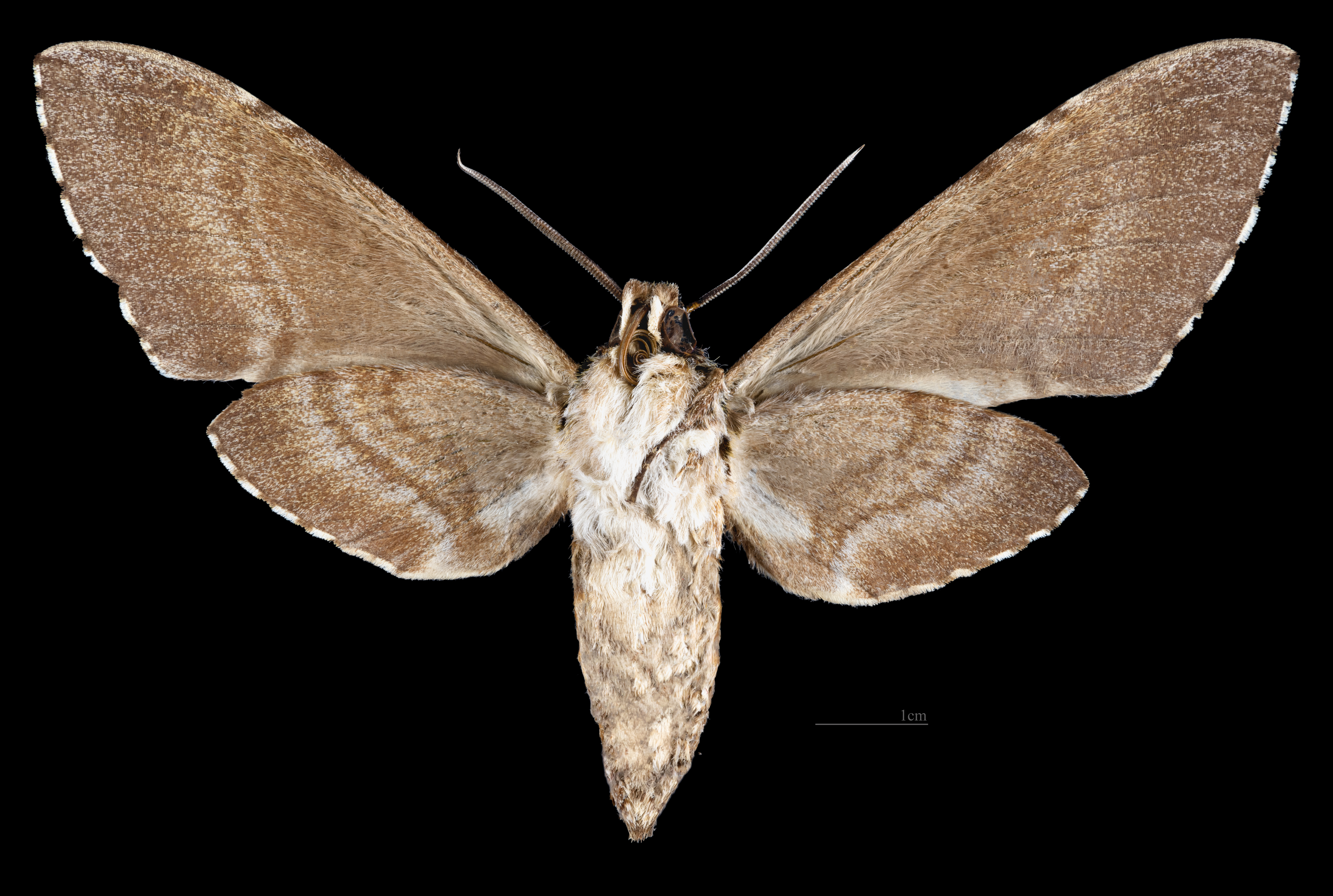
- Female ventral

Scientific classification
- Kingdom: Animalia
- Phylum: Arthropoda
- Clade: Pancrustacea
- Class: Insecta
- Order: Lepidoptera
- Family: Sphingidae
- Genus: Manduca
- Species: M. lanuginosa

Binomial name
- Manduca lanuginosa (H. Edwards, 1887)

Synonyms
- Diludia lanuginosa Edwards, 1887; Pseudosphinx crocala Druce, 1894; Protoparce hoffmanni Clark, 1917; Protoparce crocala tepici Clark, 1926

= Manduca lanuginosa =

Species of moth

Manduca lanuginosa is a moth of the family Sphingidae first described by Henry Edwards in 1887. It is known from Mexico, Belize, Honduras, Nicaragua, Costa Rica and Venezuela.

The wingspan is 86–104 mm.
