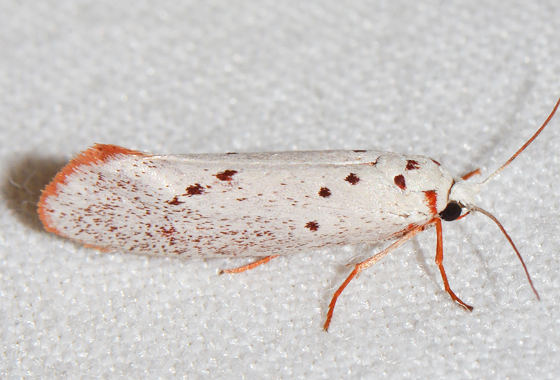

Scientific classification
- Domain: Eukaryota
- Kingdom: Animalia
- Phylum: Arthropoda
- Class: Insecta
- Order: Lepidoptera
- Family: Lacturidae
- Genus: Lactura
- Species: L. basistriga

Binomial name
- Lactura basistriga Barnes, 1913

= Lactura basistriga =

Species of moth

Lactura basistriga is a species of tropical burnet moth in the family Lacturidae. It was first described by William Barnes in 1913.

The MONA or Hodges number for Lactura basistriga is 2404.

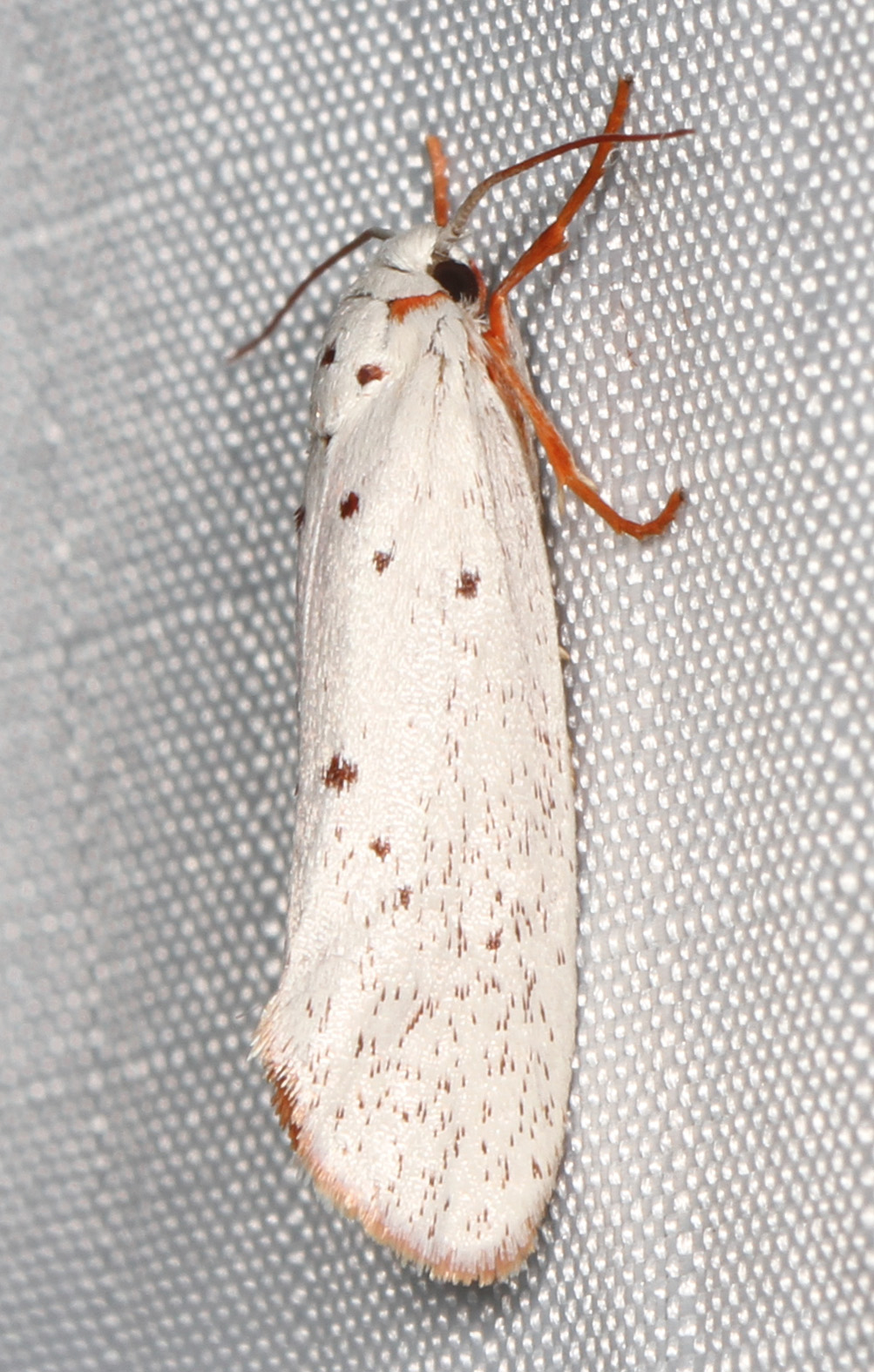
