= Carmenta texana =

Texana clearwing moth

Scientific classification
- Kingdom: Animalia
- Phylum: Arthropoda
- Clade: Pancrustacea
- Class: Insecta
- Order: Lepidoptera
- Family: Sesiidae
- Genus: Carmenta
- Species: C. texana

Binomial name
- Carmenta texana (H. Edwards, 1881)

Synonyms
- Pyrrhotaenia texana H. Edwards, 1881; Pyrohotaenia wittfeldii H. Edwards, 1883

Species of moth

Carmenta texana, the Texana clearwing moth, is a moth of the family Sesiidae. It was described by Henry Edwards in 1881 and is known from the US states of Texas and Florida.

The wingspan is about 22 mm.
