= Fania (moth) =

Scientific classification
- Domain: Eukaryota
- Kingdom: Animalia
- Phylum: Arthropoda
- Class: Insecta
- Order: Lepidoptera
- Family: Cossidae
- Subfamily: Cossinae
- Genus: Fania; Barnes & McDunnough, 1911

Genus of moths

Fania is a genus of moths in the family Cossidae erected by William Barnes and James Halliday McDunnough in 1911.

== Species ==
- Fania connectus (Barnes & McDunnough, 1916)
- Fania nanus (Strecker, 1876)
