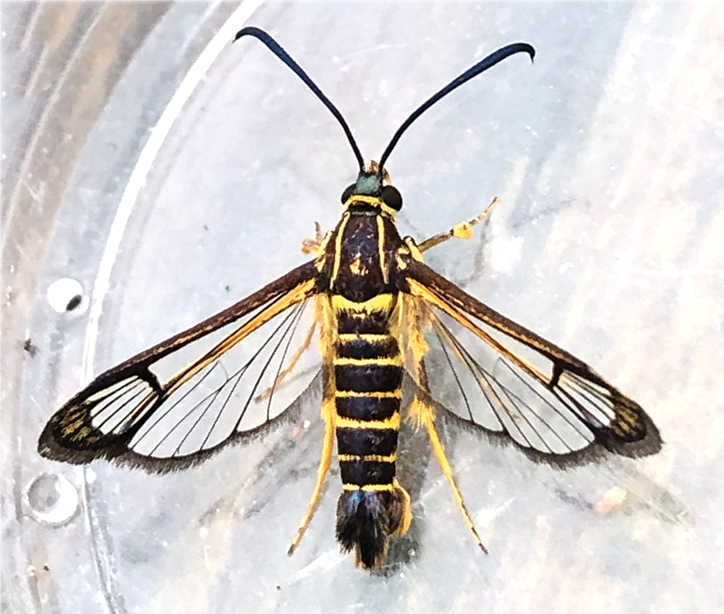

Scientific classification
- Kingdom: Animalia
- Phylum: Arthropoda
- Clade: Pancrustacea
- Class: Insecta
- Order: Lepidoptera
- Family: Sesiidae
- Genus: Carmenta
- Species: C. brachyclados

Binomial name
- Carmenta brachyclados Sterling and Lees, 2024

= Carmenta brachyclados =

Species of moth

Carmenta brachyclados is a moth of the family Sesiidae. It was described by Mark Sterling and David Lees in 2024. It is native to Guyana. It was discovered after a woman from Wales uploaded a photo of the moth in her home after it had been caught in her luggage and traveled with her from Guyana.

== Taxonomy ==
The type specimen of Carmenta brachyclados was first spotted by Ashleigh Cadet near a window in her Port Talbot home in Wales, alongside another dead specimen of the same species. Cadet photographed the moth and posted it to Instagram, where the amateur lepidopterist Graeme Davis identified it as a new species for the UK and brought the sighting to the attention of the NGO Butterfly Conservation, who contacted the Natural History Museum, London. At the museum, the moth was identified as a South American clearwing, brought over inadvertently via debris stuck to Cadet's shoes from a recent trip she had made to Guyana. The seed fragments in this debris had holes drilled into them by the moth's pupae and were identified as Mora excelsa. Carmenta brachyclados was formally described in 2024 based on the female specimen first spotted alive by Cadet. The type locality of the moth was narrowed down to Central Guyana; although type localities are normally the location where the holotype was collected, in cases of specimens artificially moved by humans, the type locality is the original location from where this transportation began.

== Description ==
The specimen of Carmenta brachyclados found was around 18 mm in length. The specimen has transparent wings, with black veins and black tips, while the upper side of its body has iridescent blue stripes that have yellow ones on the edges. The underside of the specimen is a bright yellow.
