= Carmenta suffusata =

Scientific classification
- Kingdom: Animalia
- Phylum: Arthropoda
- Clade: Pancrustacea
- Class: Insecta
- Order: Lepidoptera
- Family: Sesiidae
- Genus: Carmenta
- Species: C. suffusata

Binomial name
- Carmenta suffusata Engelhardt, 1946

Species of moth

Carmenta suffusata is a moth of the family Sesiidae. It was described by George Paul Engelhardt in 1946. It is known from the United States, including Florida, Oklahoma and Kansas.
