= Ellabella chalazombra =

Scientific classification
- Kingdom: Animalia
- Phylum: Arthropoda
- Class: Insecta
- Order: Lepidoptera
- Family: Copromorphidae
- Genus: Ellabella
- Species: E. chalazombra

Binomial name
- Ellabella chalazombra (Meyrick, 1938)

Synonyms
- Spilogenes chalazombra Meyrick, 1938

Species of moth

Ellabella chalazombra is a moth in the Copromorphidae family. It is found in China (Yunnan).

The length of the forewings is 10–11 mm for males and 10.5 mm for females. Adults are on wing from June to July.
