= Palmia =

Scientific classification
- Domain: Eukaryota
- Kingdom: Animalia
- Phylum: Arthropoda
- Class: Insecta
- Order: Lepidoptera
- Family: Sesiidae
- Tribe: Synanthedonini
- Genus: Palmia; Beutenmüller, 1896
- Species: P. praecedens

Binomial name
- Palmia praecedens (H. Edwards, 1883)

Single-species genus of moths

Palmia is monotypic moth genus in the family Sesiidae erected by William Beutenmüller in 1896. Its only species, Palmia praecedens, was described by Henry Edwards in 1883.
