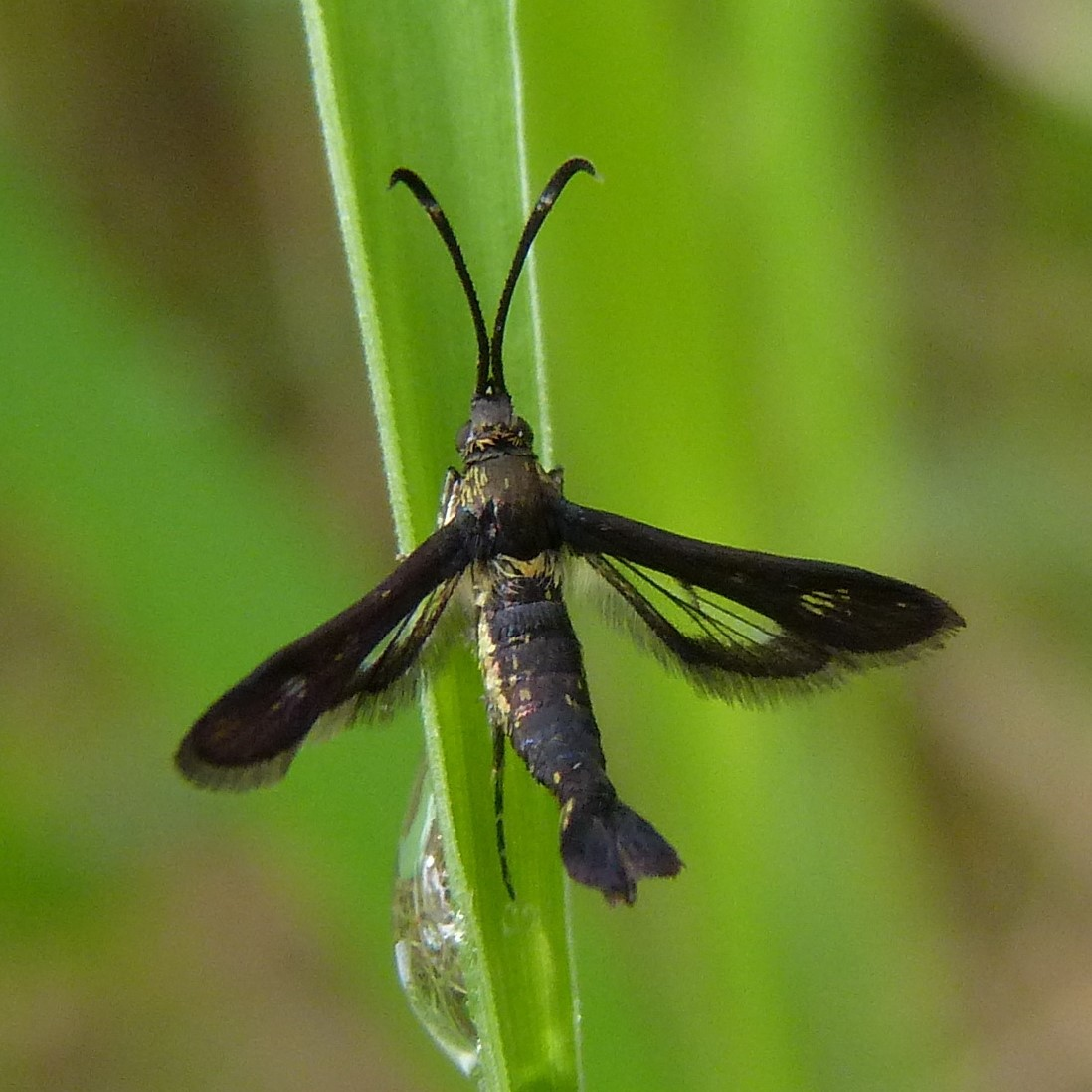

Scientific classification
- Kingdom: Animalia
- Phylum: Arthropoda
- Clade: Pancrustacea
- Class: Insecta
- Order: Lepidoptera
- Family: Sesiidae
- Genus: Carmenta
- Species: C. subaerea

Binomial name
- Carmenta subaerea (H. Edwards, 1883)

Synonyms
- Pyrrhotaenia subaerea H. Edwards, 1883

= Carmenta subaerea =

Species of moth

Carmenta subaerea is a species of moth in the family Sesiidae. It was first described in 1883 by Henry Edwards and is known from the US state of Arizona.
