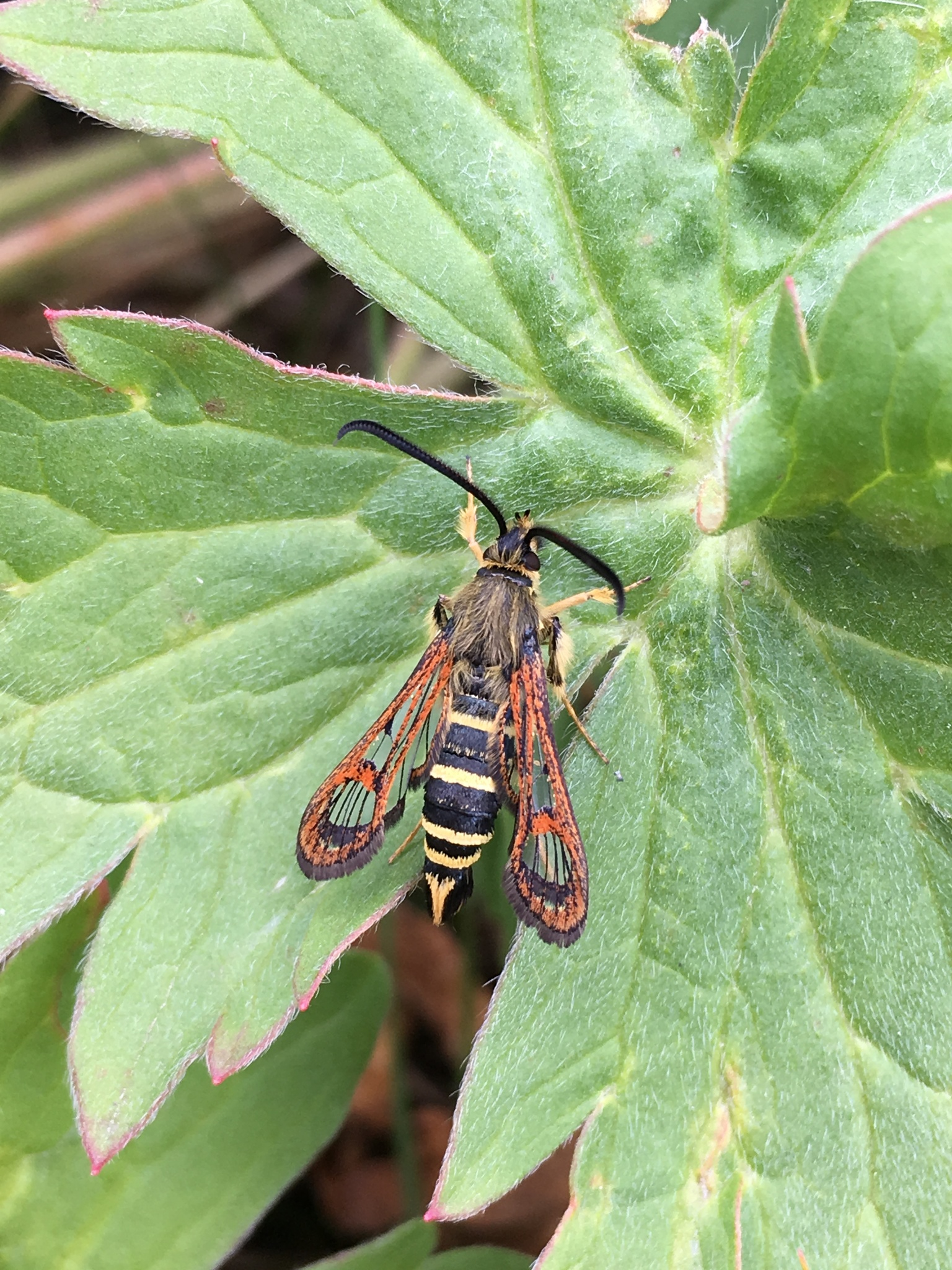

Scientific classification
- Kingdom: Animalia
- Phylum: Arthropoda
- Clade: Pancrustacea
- Class: Insecta
- Order: Lepidoptera
- Family: Sesiidae
- Genus: Carmenta
- Species: C. giliae

Binomial name
- Carmenta giliae (H. Edwards, 1881)

Synonyms
- Aegeria giliae H. Edwards, 1881; Albuna vitrina Neumoegen, 1891; Aegeria deceptiva Beutenmüller, 1894; Carmenta giliae f. woodgatei Engelhardt, 1946

= Carmenta giliae =

Species of moth

Carmenta giliae is a moth of the family Sesiidae. It was described by Henry Edwards in 1881, and is found from western Alberta to north-western British Columbia, south to Arizona and New Mexico. The habitat consists of mid-to-high elevation montane meadows.

The wingspan is about 25 mm (0.98 in).

The larvae bore in the roots of wild Geranium species.
