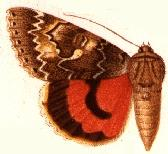

Scientific classification
- Kingdom: Animalia
- Phylum: Arthropoda
- Class: Insecta
- Order: Lepidoptera
- Superfamily: Noctuoidea
- Family: Erebidae
- Genus: Catocala
- Species: C. hermia

Binomial name
- Catocala hermia H. Edwards, 1880

Synonyms
- Catocala vesta Barnes & McDunnough, 1918; Catocala sheba Cassino, 1919; Catocala verecunda Hulst, 1884; Catocala diantha Beutenmüller, 1907; Catocala rosa Beutenmüller, 1918; Catocala ritana Beutenmüller, 1918

= Catocala hermia =

Hermia underwing

Species of moth

Catocala hermia, the Hermia underwing, is a moth of the family Erebidae. The species was first described by Henry Edwards in 1880. It is found throughout the Great Plains of North America, from southern Saskatchewan and Alberta south and west to Texas, Arizona and California.

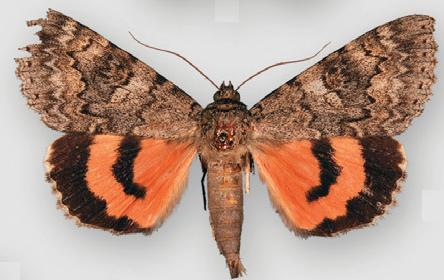
Lectotype of Catocala diantha, now considered a synonym of Catocala hermia hermia

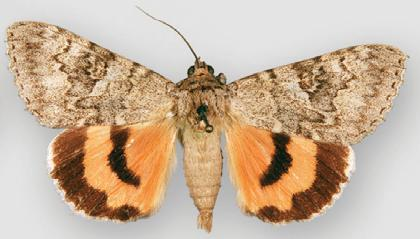
Lectotype of Catocala verecunda, now considered a synonym of Catocala hermia hermia

The wingspan is 58–68 mm. Adults are on wing from August to September depending on the location.

The larvae feed on Populus and Salix species.

== Subspecies ==
- Catocala hermia hermia
- Catocala hermia francisca H. Edwards, 1880

The latter is often treated as distinct species, leaving C. hermia monotypic.

Catocala hermia verecunda, recorded from Colorado, Montana and Arizona, was formerly considered a subspecies, but is now a synonym of Catocala hermia hermia.
