= Carmenta prosopis =

Scientific classification
- Kingdom: Animalia
- Phylum: Arthropoda
- Clade: Pancrustacea
- Class: Insecta
- Order: Lepidoptera
- Family: Sesiidae
- Genus: Carmenta
- Species: C. prosopis

Binomial name
- Carmenta prosopis (H. Edwards, 1882)

Synonyms
- Aegeria prosopis Edwards, 1882

Species of moth

Carmenta prosopis is a moth of the family Sesiidae. It was described by Henry Edwards in 1882, and is known from northern Mexico, and south-western United States.

The larvae feed on mesquites.
