= Carmenta guyanensis =

Scientific classification
- Kingdom: Animalia
- Phylum: Arthropoda
- Clade: Pancrustacea
- Class: Insecta
- Order: Lepidoptera
- Family: Sesiidae
- Genus: Carmenta
- Species: C. guyanensis

Binomial name
- Carmenta guyanensis (Le Cerf, 1917)

Synonyms
- Synanthedon guyanensis Le Cerf, 1917; Synanthedon guyanensis var. clara Le Cerf, 1917

Species of moth

Carmenta guyanensis is a moth of the family Sesiidae. It was described by Ferdinand Le Cerf in 1917, and is known from Brazil, French Guiana, Bolivia, and Peru.
