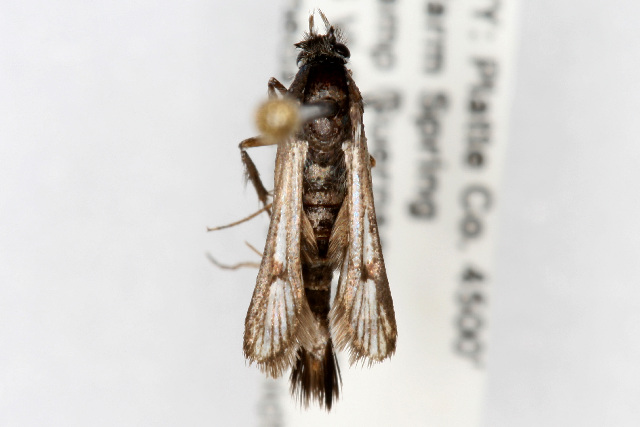
- Carmenta verecunda

Scientific classification
- Kingdom: Animalia
- Phylum: Arthropoda
- Clade: Pancrustacea
- Class: Insecta
- Order: Lepidoptera
- Family: Sesiidae
- Tribe: Synanthedonini
- Genus: Carmenta; Edwards, 1881

Species
- See text

= Carmenta (moth) =

Genus of moths

Carmenta is a genus of moths in the family Sesiidae.

== Species ==
- Carmenta aerosa (Zukowsky, 1936b:1236)
- Carmenta albicalcarata (Burmeister, 1878)
- Carmenta albociliata (Engelhardt, 1925)
- Carmenta alopecura (Zukowsky, 1937)
- Carmenta andrewsi Eichlin, 1992
- Carmenta angarodes (Meyrick, 1921)
- Carmenta anomaliformis (Walker, 1856)
- Carmenta anthracipennis (Boisduval, [1875])
- Carmenta apache Engelhardt, 1946
- Carmenta arizonae (Beutenmüller, 1898)
- Carmenta armasata (Druce, 1892)
- Carmenta asema (Zukowsky, 1936)
- Carmenta auritincta (Engelhardt, 1925)
- Carmenta aurora (Philippi, 1859)
- Carmenta autremonti (Le Cerf, 1917)
- Carmenta basalis (Walker, [1865])
- Carmenta bassiformis (Walker, 1856)
- Carmenta benoisti (Le Cerf, 1917)
- Carmenta bibio (Le Cerf, 1916b)
- Carmenta blaciformis (Walker, 1856)
- Carmenta brachyclados Sterling & Lees, 2024
- Carmenta buprestiformis (Walker, 1856)
- Carmenta ceraca (Druce, 1893)
- Carmenta chromolaenae Eichlin, 2009
- Carmenta chrysomelaena (Le Cerf, 1916)
- Carmenta coccidivora (Duckworth, 1969)
- Carmenta confusa (Butler, 1874)
- Carmenta corni (Edwards, 1881)
- Carmenta crassicornis (Walker, [1865])
- Carmenta cristallina (Le Cerf, 1916)
- Carmenta daturae (Busck, 1920)
- Carmenta deceptura (Butler, 1874)
- Carmenta deipyla (Druce, 1883)
- Carmenta dimorpha (Le Cerf, 1916b)
- Carmenta dinetiformis (Walker, 1856)
- Carmenta engelhardti Duckworth & Eichlin, 1973
- Carmenta erici (Eichlin, 1992)
- Carmenta flaschkai Eichlin, 1993
- Carmenta flavostrigata (Le Cerf, 1917)
- Carmenta foraseminis Eichlin, 1995
- Carmenta fulvopyga (Le Cerf, 1911)
- Carmenta germaini (Le Cerf, 1916)
- Carmenta giliae (Edwards, 1881)
- Carmenta guatemalena (Druce, 1883)
- Carmenta guayaba Eichlin, 2003
- Carmenta guyanensis (Le Cerf, 1917)
- Carmenta haematica (Ureta, 1956)
- Carmenta heinrichi (Schade, 1938)
- Carmenta hipsides (Druce, 1889)
- Carmenta infuscata (Le Cerf, 1911)
- Carmenta ischniformis (Walker, 1856)
- Carmenta ithacae (Beutenmüller, 1897)
- Carmenta laeta (Walker, 1856)
- Carmenta laticraspedontis (Zukowsky, 1936)
- Carmenta laurelae Brown, Eichlin & Snow, 1985
- Carmenta leptosoma Eichlin, 2002
- Carmenta lytaea (Druce, 1884)
- Carmenta macropyga (Le Cerf, 1911)
- Carmenta maeonia (Druce, 1889)
- Carmenta manilia (Druce, 1889)
- Carmenta mariona (Beutenmüller, 1900d)
- Carmenta mimosa Eichlin & Passoa, 1984
- Carmenta mimuli (Edwards, 1881)
- Carmenta minima (Le Cerf, 1916)
- Carmenta munroei Eichlin, 2003
- Carmenta mydaides (Ureta, 1956)
- Carmenta odda Duckworth & Eichlin, 1977
- Carmenta ogalala Engelhardt, 1946
- Carmenta pallene (Druce, 1889)
- Carmenta panisciformis (Walker, 1856)
- Carmenta panurgiformis (Walker, 1856)
- Carmenta phoradendri Engelhardt, 1946
- Carmenta phyllis (Druce, 1884:33)
- Carmenta pittheis (Druce, 1899:203)
- Carmenta plaumanni Eichlin, 2002
- Carmenta plectisciformis (Walker, 1856)
- Carmenta porizoniformis (Walker, 1856)
- Carmenta producta (Walker, [1865])
- Carmenta prosopis (Edwards, 1882b:99)
- Carmenta pyralidiformis (Walker, 1856)
- Carmenta pyrosoma (Meyrick, 1918)
- Carmenta querci (Edwards, 1882)
- Carmenta rubricincta (Beutenmüller, 1909)
- Carmenta ruficaudis (Walker, [1865])
- Carmenta splendens Eichlin, 2002
- Carmenta subaerea (Edwards, 1883)
- Carmenta suffusata Engelhardt, 1946
- Carmenta surinamensis (Möschler, 1878)
- Carmenta tecta (Edwards, 1882)
- Carmenta teleta (Le Cerf, 1916)
- Carmenta texana (Edwards, 1881)
- Carmenta theobromae (Busck, 1910)
- Carmenta tildeni Eichlin, 1995
- Carmenta tucumana (Le Cerf, 1911)
- Carmenta unicolor (Walker, [1865])
- Carmenta verecunda (Edwards, 1881)
- Carmenta votaria (Meyrick, 1921)
- Carmenta wagneri (Le Cerf, 1911)
- Carmenta welchelorum Duckworth & Eichlin, 1977
- Carmenta wellerae Duckworth & Eichlin, 1976
- Carmenta whitelyi (Druce, 1899)
- Carmenta wielgusi Eichlin, 1987
- Carmenta xanthomelanina (Zukowsky, 1936)
- Carmenta xanthoneura (Zukowsky, 1936b)
