= Carmenta chromolaenae =

Scientific classification
- Kingdom: Animalia
- Phylum: Arthropoda
- Clade: Pancrustacea
- Class: Insecta
- Order: Lepidoptera
- Family: Sesiidae
- Genus: Carmenta
- Species: C. chromolaenae

Binomial name
- Carmenta chromolaenae Eichlin, 2009

Synonyms
- Synanthedon chromolaenae (Eichlin, 2009)

Species of moth

Carmenta chromolaenae is a moth of the family Sesiidae. It is native to Venezuela, but was introduced to South Africa for the biological control of Siam weed (Chromolaena odorata).

The length of the forewings is 4–7 mm.

The larvae feed on Chromolaena odorata.
