= Ellabella =

Scientific classification
- Domain: Eukaryota
- Kingdom: Animalia
- Phylum: Arthropoda
- Class: Insecta
- Order: Lepidoptera
- Family: Copromorphidae
- Genus: Ellabella; Busck, 1925

Synonyms
- Probolacma Meyrick, 1927; Spilogenes Meyrick, 1938

Genus of moths

Ellabella is a genus of moths in the family Copromorphidae.

== Species ==
- Ellabella bayensis Heppner, 1984
- Ellabella chalazombra (Meyrick, 1938)
- Ellabella editha Busck, 1925
- Ellabella johnstoni Heppner, 1984
- Ellabella melanoclista Meyrick, 1927 (originally in Probolacma)
