= List of moths of North America =

There are about 12,000 types of North American moths. In comparison, there are about 825 species of North American butterflies. The moths (mostly nocturnal) and butterflies (mostly diurnal) together make up the taxonomic order Lepidoptera.

This list is sorted by MONA number (sometimes called a Hodges number), a numbering system for North American moths introduced by Ronald W. Hodges, et al. in 1983 in the publication Check List of the Lepidoptera of America North of Mexico. The list has since been updated, but the placement in families is outdated for some species.

Former numbers for some species are given in square brackets, for example:

- 3754 [3807] – Aethes angulatana

This list covers America north of Mexico (effectively continental United States and Canada). For a list of moths and butterflies recorded from the state of Hawaii, see List of Lepidoptera of Hawaii.

== Sublists ==
- List of moths of North America (MONA 001–854.1) – Micropterigidae, Eriocraniidae, Acanthopteroctetidae, Hepialidae, Nepticulidae, Opostegidae, Tischeriidae, Incurvariidae and Prodoxidae, Adelidae, Heliozelidae and Elachistidae, Tineidae and Acrolophidae, Psychidae, Lyonetiidae, Bucculatricidae, Gracillariidae
- List of moths of North America (MONA 855–2311) – Oecophoridae, Elachistidae, Symmocidae, Glyphidoceridae, Autostichidae, Blastobasidae, Coleophoridae and Batrachedridae, Momphidae, Cosmopterigidae, Scythrididae, Gelechiidae
- List of moths of North America (MONA 2312–2700.1) – Copromorphoidea and Alucitidae, Epermeniidae, Yponomeutoidea, Sesiidae, Choreutidae, Cossidae
- List of moths of North America (MONA 2701–3862) – Tortricidae
- List of moths of North America (MONA 4618–5509) – Zygaenidae, Megalopygidae, Limacodidae and Dalceridae, Crambidae
- List of moths of North America (MONA 5510–6088) – Pyralidae, Thyrididae, Hyblaeidae
- List of moths of North America (MONA 6089–7648) – Pterophoridae, Drepanoidea, Geometridae,
- List of moths of North America (MONA 7649–8321) – Uraniidae and Sematuridae, Mimallonidae, Bombycidae, Lasiocampidae, Saturniidae, Sphingidae, Notodontidae, Arctiidae, Lymantriidae
- List of moths of North America (MONA 8322–11233) – Noctuidae

== See also ==
- List of butterflies of North America
- List of Lepidoptera of Hawaii
- List of moths of Canada
- List of butterflies of Canada
