= Carmenta phoradendri =

Scientific classification
- Kingdom: Animalia
- Phylum: Arthropoda
- Clade: Pancrustacea
- Class: Insecta
- Order: Lepidoptera
- Family: Sesiidae
- Genus: Carmenta
- Species: C. phoradendri

Binomial name
- Carmenta phoradendri Engelhardt, 1946

Species of moth

Carmenta phoradendri, the mistletoe borer, is a moth of the family Sesiidae. It was described by George Paul Engelhardt in 1946. It is known from south-eastern Arizona and southern Texas in the United States and from Mexico.

Adults are on wing in August and September.

Larvae feed on Phoradendron tomentosum growing on mesquite (Prosopis glandulosa).
