= Carmenta tecta =

Scientific classification
- Kingdom: Animalia
- Phylum: Arthropoda
- Clade: Pancrustacea
- Class: Insecta
- Order: Lepidoptera
- Family: Sesiidae
- Genus: Carmenta
- Species: C. tecta

Binomial name
- Carmenta tecta (H. Edwards, 1882)

Synonyms
- Aegeria tecta Edwards, 1882

Species of moth

Carmenta tecta, the mistletoe stem borer, is a moth of the family Sesiidae. It was described by Henry Edwards in 1882. It is known from the United States, including Arizona.

Larvae are known from live oak groves with colonies of Phoradendron orbiculatum, on which the larvae feed.
