= Catocala ophelia =

Scientific classification
- Kingdom: Animalia
- Phylum: Arthropoda
- Class: Insecta
- Order: Lepidoptera
- Superfamily: Noctuoidea
- Family: Erebidae
- Genus: Catocala
- Species: C. ophelia

Binomial name
- Catocala ophelia H. Edwards, 1880

Synonyms
- Catocala verrilliana var. ophelia H. Edwards, 1880; Catocala ophelia var. dollii Beutenmüller, 1907

Species of moth

Catocala ophelia is a moth of the family Erebidae. It is found in the dry forests of Arizona, California and south-western Oregon.

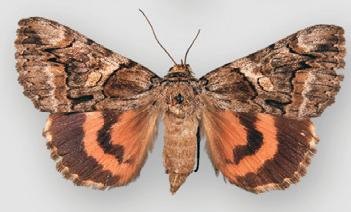
neotype of Catocala ophelia var. dollii now considered a synonym of Catocala ophelia

The wingspan is about 52 mm. Adults are on wing from July to October depending on the location. There is probably one generation per year.

The larvae feed on Quercus macrocarpa and Quercus chrysolepis.

== Subspecies ==
Former subspecies Catocala ophelia dollii is now considered a synonym.
