= Carmenta apache =

Scientific classification
- Kingdom: Animalia
- Phylum: Arthropoda
- Clade: Pancrustacea
- Class: Insecta
- Order: Lepidoptera
- Family: Sesiidae
- Genus: Carmenta
- Species: C. apache

Binomial name
- Carmenta apache Engelhardt, 1946

Species of moth

Carmenta apache is a moth of the family Sesiidae. It was described by George Paul Engelhardt in 1946. It is known only from Arizona in the United States.
