= Carmenta corni =

Scientific classification
- Kingdom: Animalia
- Phylum: Arthropoda
- Clade: Pancrustacea
- Class: Insecta
- Order: Lepidoptera
- Family: Sesiidae
- Genus: Carmenta
- Species: C. corni

Binomial name
- Carmenta corni (H. Edwards, 1881)

Synonyms
- Aegeria corni H. Edwards, 1881; Aegeria infirma H. Edwards, 1881

Species of moth

Carmenta corni, the aster borer moth, is a moth of the family Sesiidae. It was first described by Henry Edwards in 1881. It is known in North America, including Wisconsin.

Adults are on wing from July to August.

The larvae feed on the roots of Veronica and Aster species and Eurybia macrophylla.
