= Carmenta albociliata =

Scientific classification
- Kingdom: Animalia
- Phylum: Arthropoda
- Clade: Pancrustacea
- Class: Insecta
- Order: Lepidoptera
- Family: Sesiidae
- Genus: Carmenta
- Species: C. albociliata

Binomial name
- Carmenta albociliata (Engelhardt, 1925)

Synonyms
- Synanthedon albociliata Engelhardt, 1925

Species of moth

Carmenta albociliata is a moth of the family Sesiidae. It was described by Engelhardt in 1925. It is known from North America, including Texas and Arizona.
