= Carmenta querci =

Scientific classification
- Kingdom: Animalia
- Phylum: Arthropoda
- Clade: Pancrustacea
- Class: Insecta
- Order: Lepidoptera
- Family: Sesiidae
- Genus: Carmenta
- Species: C. querci

Binomial name
- Carmenta querci (H. Edwards, 1882)

Synonyms
- Aegeria querci Edwards, 1882; Podosesia comes Heinrich, 1921

Species of moth

Carmenta querci is a moth of the family Sesiidae. It was described by Henry Edwards in 1882, and is known from the United States, including Colorado and Arizona.

Larvae have been reared from galls on Quercus arizonica and Quercus oblongifolia.
