= Carmenta ogalala =

Scientific classification
- Kingdom: Animalia
- Phylum: Arthropoda
- Clade: Pancrustacea
- Class: Insecta
- Order: Lepidoptera
- Family: Sesiidae
- Genus: Carmenta
- Species: C. ogalala

Binomial name
- Carmenta ogalala Engelhardt, 1946

Species of moth

Carmenta ogalala is a moth of the family Sesiidae. It was described by Engelhardt in 1946. It is known from Colorado.
