= Carmenta auritincta =

Scientific classification
- Kingdom: Animalia
- Phylum: Arthropoda
- Clade: Pancrustacea
- Class: Insecta
- Order: Lepidoptera
- Family: Sesiidae
- Genus: Carmenta
- Species: C. auritincta

Binomial name
- Carmenta auritincta (Engelhardt, 1925)

Synonyms
- Synanthedon auritincta Engelhardt, 1925 (nec Canopia auritincta Wileman & South, 1918)

Species of moth

Carmenta auritincta, the Arizona clearwing moth, is a moth of the family Sesiidae. It was described by Engelhardt in 1925. It is known from south-eastern Arizona and northern Mexico.
