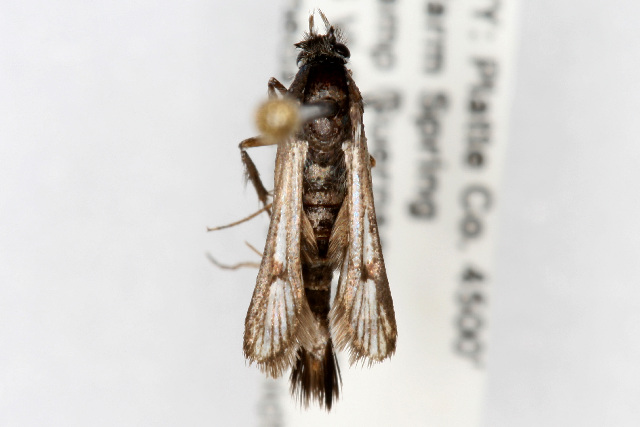

Scientific classification
- Kingdom: Animalia
- Phylum: Arthropoda
- Clade: Pancrustacea
- Class: Insecta
- Order: Lepidoptera
- Family: Sesiidae
- Genus: Carmenta
- Species: C. verecunda

Binomial name
- Carmenta verecunda (H. Edwards, 1881)

Synonyms
- Aegeria verecunda H. Edwards, 1881; Carmenta nigra Beutenmüller, 1894; Sesia florissantella Cockerell, 1908; Euhagena hirsuta Engelhardt, 1946

= Carmenta verecunda =

Species of moth

Carmenta verecunda is a moth of the family Sesiidae. It was described by Henry Edwards in 1881, and is known from the United States, including Colorado, Utah, California and Arizona.

The larvae feed on Lithospermum ruderale.
