= Carmenta theobromae =

Scientific classification
- Kingdom: Animalia
- Phylum: Arthropoda
- Clade: Pancrustacea
- Class: Insecta
- Order: Lepidoptera
- Family: Sesiidae
- Genus: Carmenta
- Species: C. theobromae

Binomial name
- Carmenta theobromae (Busck, 1910)

Synonyms
- Sesia theobromae Busck, 1910

Species of moth

Carmenta theobromae, the cocoa fruit borer, is a moth of the family Sesiidae. It was described by August Busck in 1910, and is known from Colombia and Venezuela.

The larvae of the species feed on Theobroma cacao. They perforate the pods of their host plant and are considered a serious pest.
