= Carmenta mimosa =

Scientific classification
- Kingdom: Animalia
- Phylum: Arthropoda
- Clade: Pancrustacea
- Class: Insecta
- Order: Lepidoptera
- Family: Sesiidae
- Genus: Carmenta
- Species: C. mimosa

Binomial name
- Carmenta mimosa Eichlin & Passoa, 1984

Species of moth

Carmenta mimosa is a moth of the family Sesiidae. It is native to Central America (Mexico, Honduras and Nicaragua), but has been introduced to the Northern Territory of Australia in 1989.
