= Carmenta pallene =

Scientific classification
- Kingdom: Animalia
- Phylum: Arthropoda
- Clade: Pancrustacea
- Class: Insecta
- Order: Lepidoptera
- Family: Sesiidae
- Genus: Carmenta
- Species: C. pallene

Binomial name
- Carmenta pallene (H. Druce, 1889)

Synonyms
- Aegeria pallene H. Druce, 1889

Species of moth

Carmenta pallene is a moth of the family Sesiidae. It was described by Herbert Druce in 1889. It was described from Tabasco in Mexico, but it is also known from Arizona in the United States.
