= Carmenta rubricincta =

Scientific classification
- Kingdom: Animalia
- Phylum: Arthropoda
- Clade: Pancrustacea
- Class: Insecta
- Order: Lepidoptera
- Family: Sesiidae
- Genus: Carmenta
- Species: C. rubricincta

Binomial name
- Carmenta rubricincta (Beutenmüller, 1909)

Synonyms
- Sesia rubricincta Beutenmüller, 1909

Species of moth

Carmenta rubricincta is a moth of the family Sesiidae. It was described by William Beutenmüller in 1909. It is known from North America, including Arizona.
