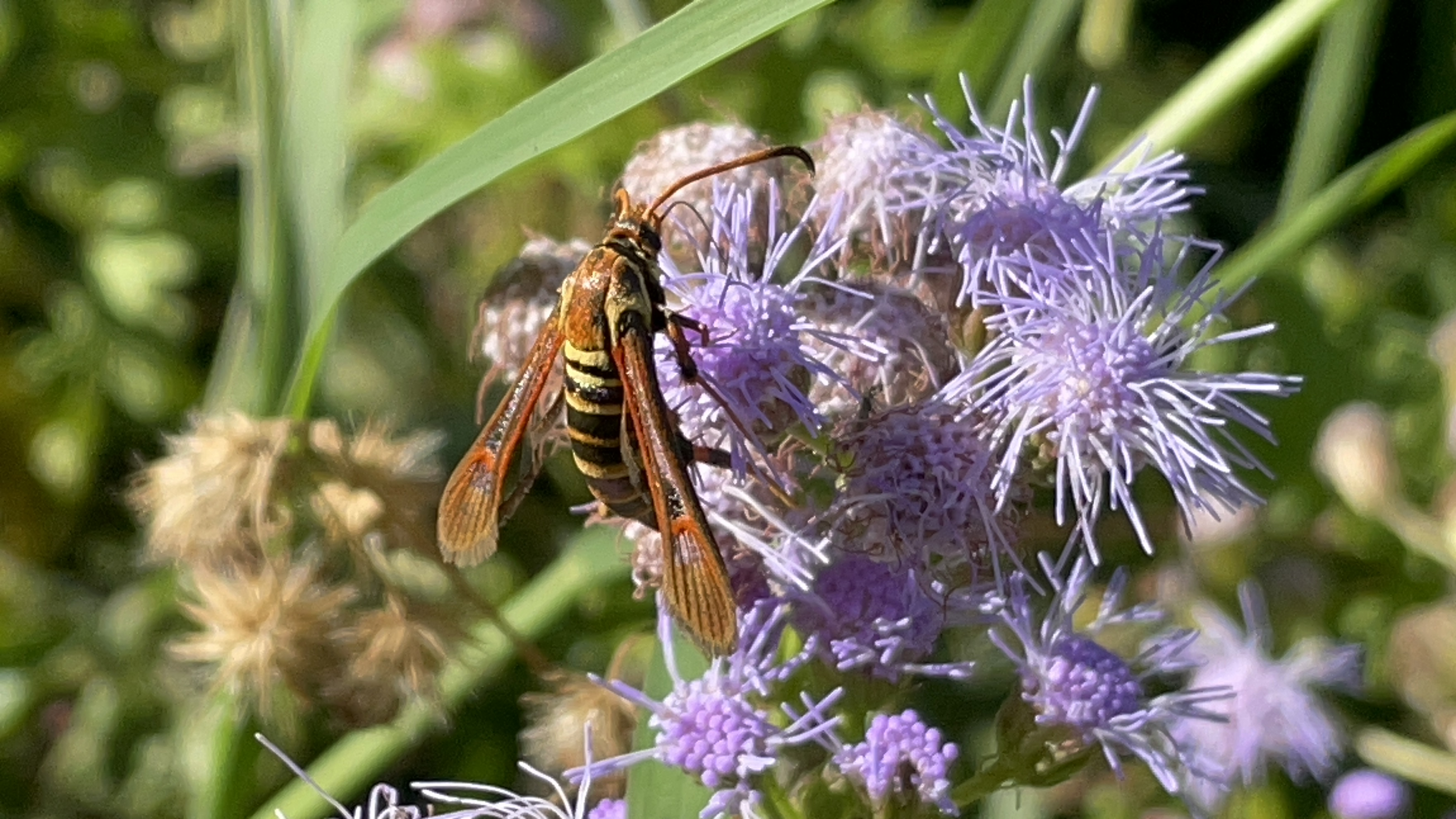

Scientific classification
- Kingdom: Animalia
- Phylum: Arthropoda
- Clade: Pancrustacea
- Class: Insecta
- Order: Lepidoptera
- Family: Sesiidae
- Genus: Carmenta
- Species: C. armasata

Binomial name
- Carmenta armasata (H. Druce, 1892)

Synonyms
- Aegeria armasata H. Druce, 1892

= Carmenta armasata =

Species of moth

Carmenta armasata is a moth of the family Sesiidae. It was described by Herbert Druce in 1892. It is known from the US state of Texas.
