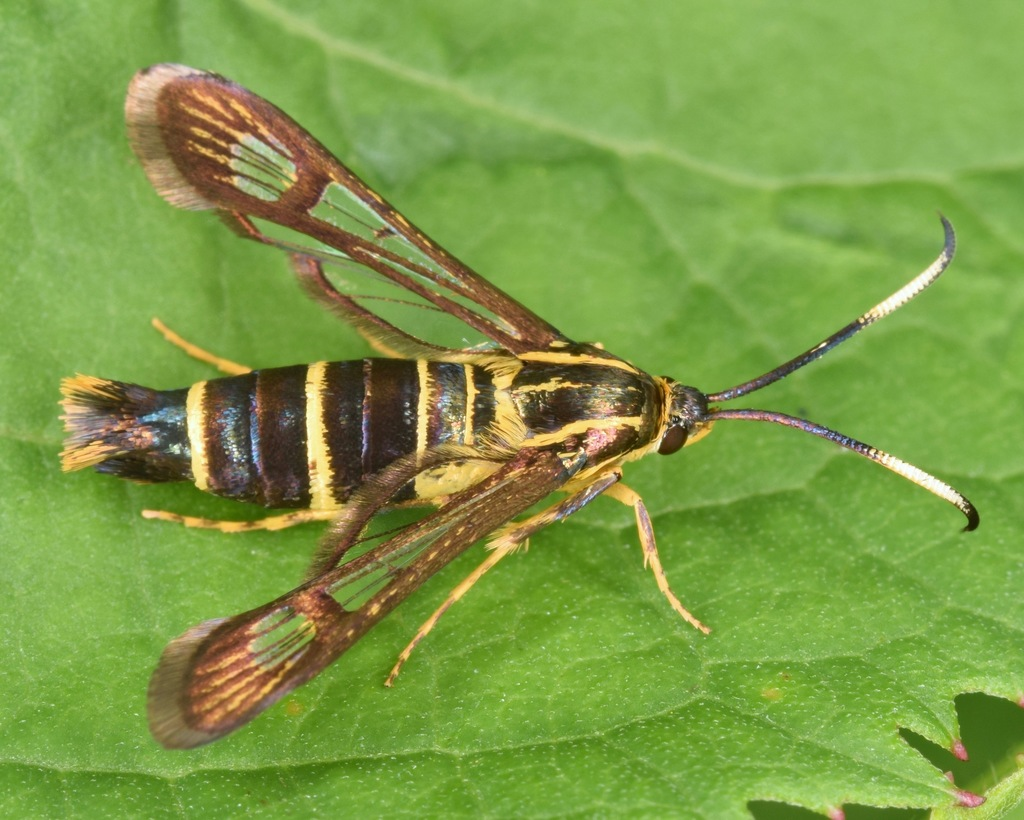
- Female
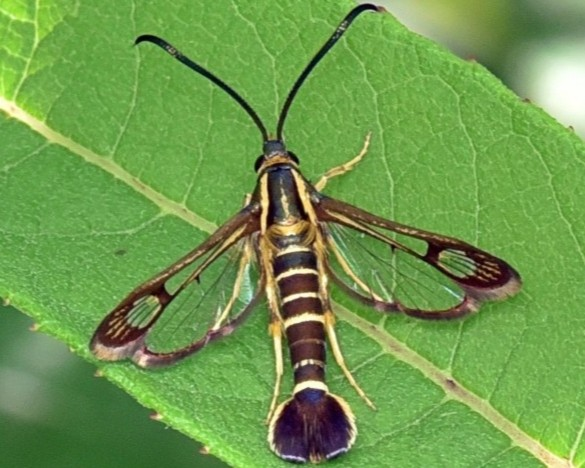
- Male

Scientific classification
- Kingdom: Animalia
- Phylum: Arthropoda
- Clade: Pancrustacea
- Class: Insecta
- Order: Lepidoptera
- Family: Sesiidae
- Genus: Carmenta
- Species: C. bassiformis

Binomial name
- Carmenta bassiformis (Walker, 1856)

Synonyms
- Aegeria bassiformis Walker, 1856; Trochilium lustrans Grote, 1880; Aegeria aureopurpura Edwards, 1880; Aegeria bolli Edwards, 1881; Aegeria sexfasciata Edwards, 1881; Aegeria consimilis Edwards, 1881; Aegeria eupatorii Edwards, 1881; Aegeria imitata Edwards, 1881

= Carmenta bassiformis =

Species of moth

Carmenta bassiformis, the eupatorium borer moth or ironweed clearwing moth, is a moth of the family Sesiidae. It was described by Francis Walker in 1856. Adults are on wing from late May to September.

== Description and sexual dimorphism ==
C. bassiformis displays clear wings, or areas of translucence, with a dark border around the forewing. Their wingspan in males is 17-20 mm, with females being 20-22 mm. Both males and females have a purplish-black thorax, and the abdomen the same but with yellow stripes. On females, the 3rd and 5th stripe will be thinner, while males will remain, for the most part, around the same width. Females will also have white segments on their antennae, while males will have all black or short tips of white. Female's tails will have a tuft of orange, while male's will be more flat and black.

== Distribution ==
C. bassiformis is found in the eastern United States from New York to Florida; west to Wisconsin, Kansas, and Texas.

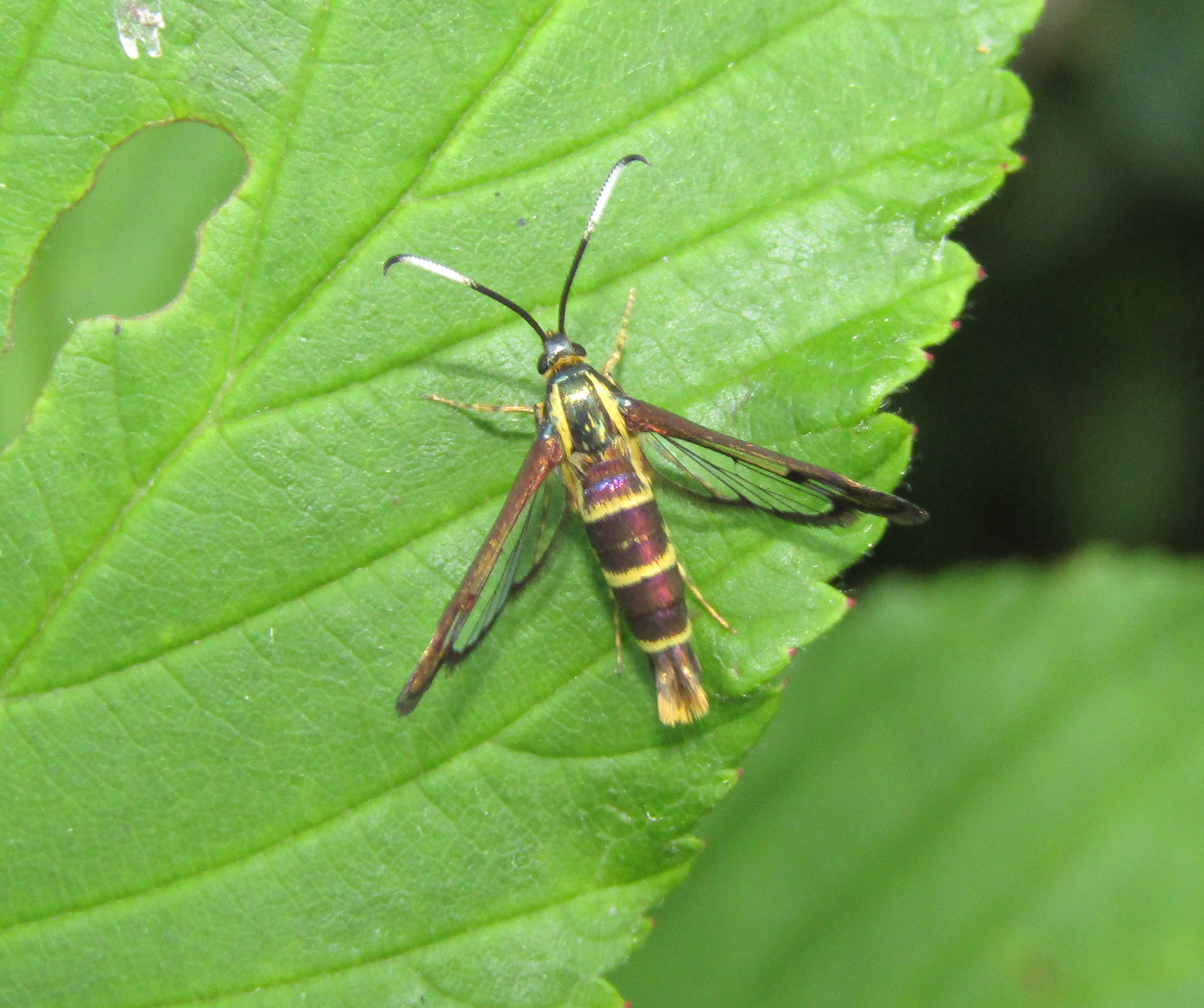

== Diet ==
The larvae of C. bassiformis feed on the roots of ironweed and Joe-Pye weed, specifically Eutrochium purpureum.
