= Carmenta arizonae =

Scientific classification
- Kingdom: Animalia
- Phylum: Arthropoda
- Clade: Pancrustacea
- Class: Insecta
- Order: Lepidoptera
- Family: Sesiidae
- Genus: Carmenta
- Species: C. arizonae

Binomial name
- Carmenta arizonae (Beutenmüller, 1898)

Synonyms
- Sesia arizonae (Beutenmüller, 1898)

Species of moth

Carmenta arizonae is a moth of the family Sesiidae. It was described by William Beutenmüller in 1898. It is known from the US state of Arizona.
