= Ellabella johnstoni =

Scientific classification
- Kingdom: Animalia
- Phylum: Arthropoda
- Clade: Pancrustacea
- Class: Insecta
- Order: Lepidoptera
- Family: Copromorphidae
- Genus: Ellabella
- Species: E. johnstoni

Binomial name
- Ellabella johnstoni Heppner, 1984

Species of moth

Ellabella johnstoni is a moth in the Copromorphidae family. It is found in Washington.

The length of the forewings is 11–13 mm for males and 10.5 mm for females. Adults are on wing from April to May.
