= Carmenta welchelorum =

Scientific classification
- Kingdom: Animalia
- Phylum: Arthropoda
- Clade: Pancrustacea
- Class: Insecta
- Order: Lepidoptera
- Family: Sesiidae
- Genus: Carmenta
- Species: C. welchelorum

Binomial name
- Carmenta welchelorum Duckworth & Eichlin, 1977

Species of moth

Carmenta welchelorum is a moth of the family Sesiidae. It was described by W. Donald Duckworth and Thomas Drake Eichlin in 1977. It is known from south-central Texas in the United States.
