= Fania connectus =

Scientific classification
- Domain: Eukaryota
- Kingdom: Animalia
- Phylum: Arthropoda
- Class: Insecta
- Order: Lepidoptera
- Family: Cossidae
- Genus: Fania
- Species: F. connectus

Binomial name
- Fania connectus (Barnes & McDunnough, 1916)

Synonyms
- Acossus connectus Barnes & McDunnough, 1916; Fania connecta

Species of moth

Fania connectus is a species of moth of the family Cossidae first described by William Barnes and James Halliday McDunnough in 1916. It is found in Texas in the United States.

The wingspan is about 30 mm. The basal half of the forewings is light smoky brown and the outer half is paler and tinged with silvery white. There are numerous deep black transverse streaks besides two rather prominent postmedian irregular lines, connected together in the fold by a black streak. The hindwings are paler with only traces of reticulation (a net-like pattern). Adults are on wing from April to May and again in fall.
