= Carmenta anthracipennis =

Scientific classification
- Kingdom: Animalia
- Phylum: Arthropoda
- Clade: Pancrustacea
- Class: Insecta
- Order: Lepidoptera
- Family: Sesiidae
- Genus: Carmenta
- Species: C. anthracipennis

Binomial name
- Carmenta anthracipennis (Boisduval, 1875)

Synonyms
- Sesia anthracipennis Boisduval, 1875; Carmenta sanborni Edwards, 1881; Aegeria morula (Edwards, 1881)

Species of moth

Carmenta anthracipennis, the liatris borer moth, is a moth of the family Sesiidae. It was described by Jean Baptiste Boisduval in 1875, and is known from the United States, including Florida, Texas, Massachusetts and Illinois.

The larvae bore through the stems of Liatris species.
