= Glyphipterix bifasciata =

Scientific classification
- Kingdom: Animalia
- Phylum: Arthropoda
- Clade: Pancrustacea
- Class: Insecta
- Order: Lepidoptera
- Family: Glyphipterigidae
- Genus: Glyphipterix
- Species: G. bifasciata

Binomial name
- Glyphipterix bifasciata Walsingham, 1881

Species of moth

Glyphipterix bifasciata is a species of sedge moth in the genus Glyphipterix. It was described by Walsingham in 1881. It is found in North America, including Washington, California and British Columbia.

The wingspan is about 15 mm.
