= Carmenta laurelae =

Scientific classification
- Kingdom: Animalia
- Phylum: Arthropoda
- Clade: Pancrustacea
- Class: Insecta
- Order: Lepidoptera
- Family: Sesiidae
- Genus: Carmenta
- Species: C. laurelae

Binomial name
- Carmenta laurelae Brown, Eichlin & Snow, 1985

Species of moth

Carmenta laurelae is a moth of the family Sesiidae. It was described by Larry N. Brown, Thomas D. Eichlin and J. Wendell Snow in 1985, and is known from the US state of Florida.

The length of the forewings is 9–10 mm.
