= Ellabella melanoclista =

Scientific classification
- Kingdom: Animalia
- Phylum: Arthropoda
- Class: Insecta
- Order: Lepidoptera
- Family: Copromorphidae
- Genus: Ellabella
- Species: E. melanoclista

Binomial name
- Ellabella melanoclista (Meyrick, 1927)

Synonyms
- Probolacma melanoclista Meyrick, 1927

Species of moth

Ellabella melanoclista is a moth in the Copromorphidae family. It is found from Arizona to Texas.

The length of the forewings is 9.6-11.2 mm for males and 10-11.2 mm for females. Adults are on wing from March to May.
