= Glyphipterix montisella =

Scientific classification
- Kingdom: Animalia
- Phylum: Arthropoda
- Clade: Pancrustacea
- Class: Insecta
- Order: Lepidoptera
- Family: Glyphipterigidae
- Genus: Glyphipterix
- Species: G. montisella

Binomial name
- Glyphipterix montisella Chambers, 1875

Synonyms
- Glyphipteryx montella Meyrick, 1913

Species of moth

Glyphipterix montisella is a species of sedge moth in the genus Glyphipterix. It was described by Vactor Tousey Chambers in 1875. It is found in North America, including Colorado, Arizona and California.
