= Carmenta mariona =

Scientific classification
- Kingdom: Animalia
- Phylum: Arthropoda
- Clade: Pancrustacea
- Class: Insecta
- Order: Lepidoptera
- Family: Sesiidae
- Genus: Carmenta
- Species: C. mariona

Binomial name
- Carmenta mariona (Beutenmüller, 1900)

Synonyms
- Sesia mariona Beutenmüller, 1900

Species of moth

Carmenta mariona is a moth of the family Sesiidae. It was described by William Beutenmüller in 1900. It is found in the United States from Montana, south to Arizona and east to Kansas.

Adults are on wing from June to August.

The larvae feed on the roots of Amsinckia species and Lithospermum incisum.
