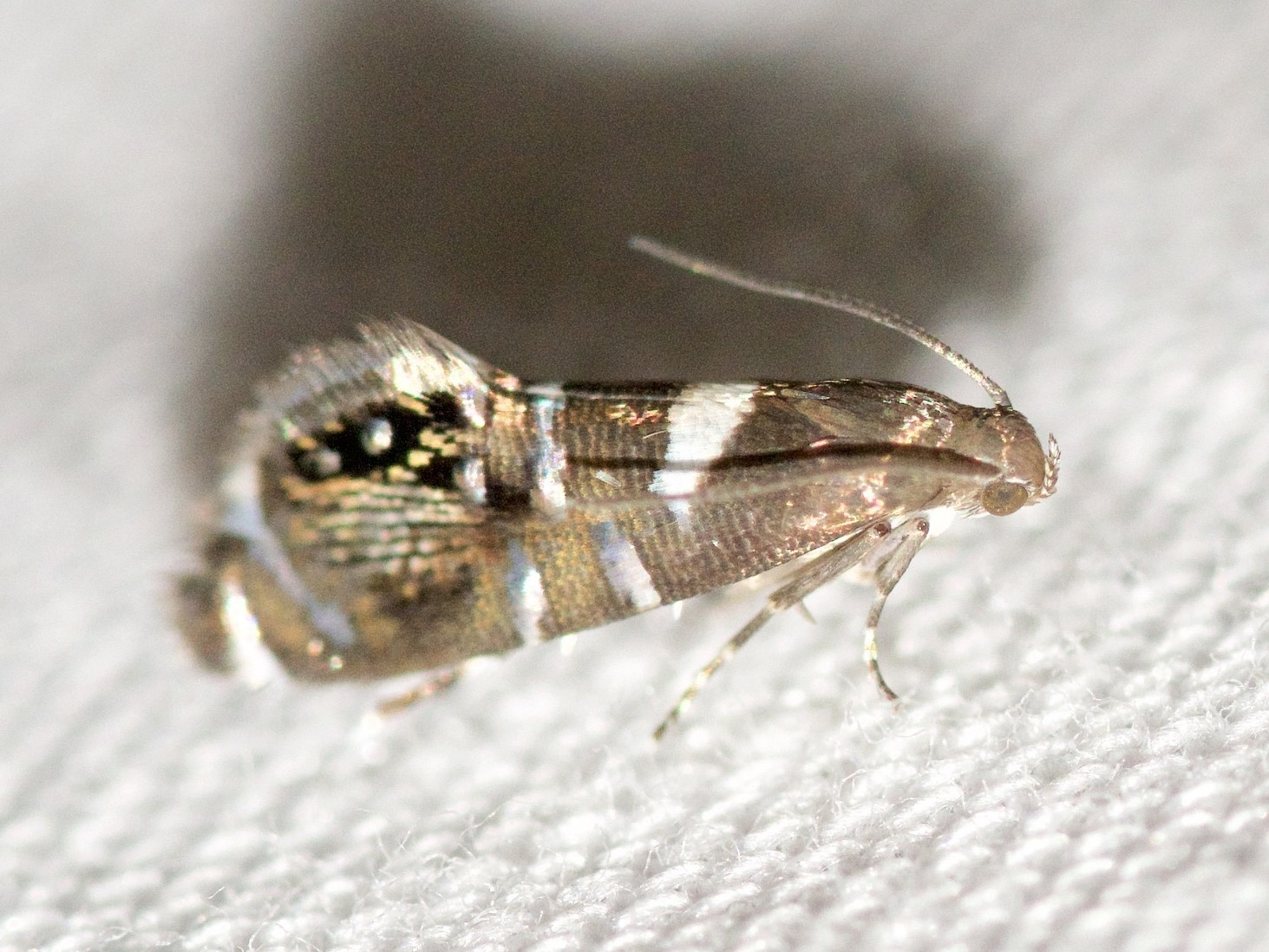

Scientific classification
- Kingdom: Animalia
- Phylum: Arthropoda
- Clade: Pancrustacea
- Class: Insecta
- Order: Lepidoptera
- Family: Glyphipterigidae
- Genus: Glyphipterix
- Species: G. circumscriptella

Binomial name
- Glyphipterix circumscriptella Chambers, 1881

Synonyms
- Glyphipterix circumscripta Dyar, 1900; Glyphipterix apacheana Heppner, 1985

= Glyphipterix circumscriptella =

Species of moth

Glyphipterix circumscriptella is a species of sedge moth in the genus Glyphipterix. It was described by Vactor Tousey Chambers in 1881. It is found in North America, including Illinois, Kentucky, New York, Quebec, Texas and Wisconsin.
