= Ellabella bayensis =

Scientific classification
- Kingdom: Animalia
- Phylum: Arthropoda
- Clade: Pancrustacea
- Class: Insecta
- Order: Lepidoptera
- Family: Copromorphidae
- Genus: Ellabella
- Species: E. bayensis

Binomial name
- Ellabella bayensis Heppner, 1984

Species of moth

Ellabella bayensis is a moth in the Copromorphidae family. It is found in California.

The length of the forewings is 8.2–11 mm for males and 8.8-10.8 mm for females. Adults are on wing from January to March.

The larvae feed on the foliage of Mahonia pinnata. They feed from within silk-tied shelters.
