= Carmenta engelhardti =

Scientific classification
- Kingdom: Animalia
- Phylum: Arthropoda
- Clade: Pancrustacea
- Class: Insecta
- Order: Lepidoptera
- Family: Sesiidae
- Genus: Carmenta
- Species: C. engelhardti

Binomial name
- Carmenta engelhardti Duckworth & Eichlin, 1973

Species of moth

Carmenta engelhardti is a moth of the family Sesiidae. It was described by W. Donald Duckworth and Thomas Drake Eichlin in 1973. It is known from Arizona in the United States.

It was collected on Brickellia foliage found along small creeks in the Patagonia and Huachuca mountains in August.
