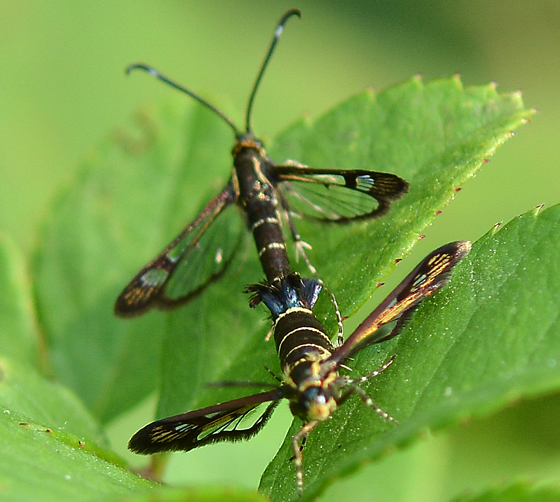

Scientific classification
- Kingdom: Animalia
- Phylum: Arthropoda
- Clade: Pancrustacea
- Class: Insecta
- Order: Lepidoptera
- Family: Sesiidae
- Genus: Carmenta
- Species: C. ithacae

Binomial name
- Carmenta ithacae (Beutenmüller, 1897)

Synonyms
- Sesia ithacae Beutenmüller, 1897; Aegeria koebelei Edwards, 1881

= Carmenta ithacae =

Species of moth

Carmenta ithacae is a root-boring moth of the family Sesiidae. It was described by William Beutenmüller in 1897. It is known from North America, including Florida, Arizona, Illinois, Michigan, Nebraska, New York, Virginia and Wisconsin.

Adults are on wing from late June to July.

The larvae feed on various composites like Helenium species, as well as Aster species.

C. ithacae has been introduced in Australia as a biological control agent for Parthenium hysterophorus, and is now widespread in central and northern Queensland and recently introduced in the south. Heavily-infested plants often die.
