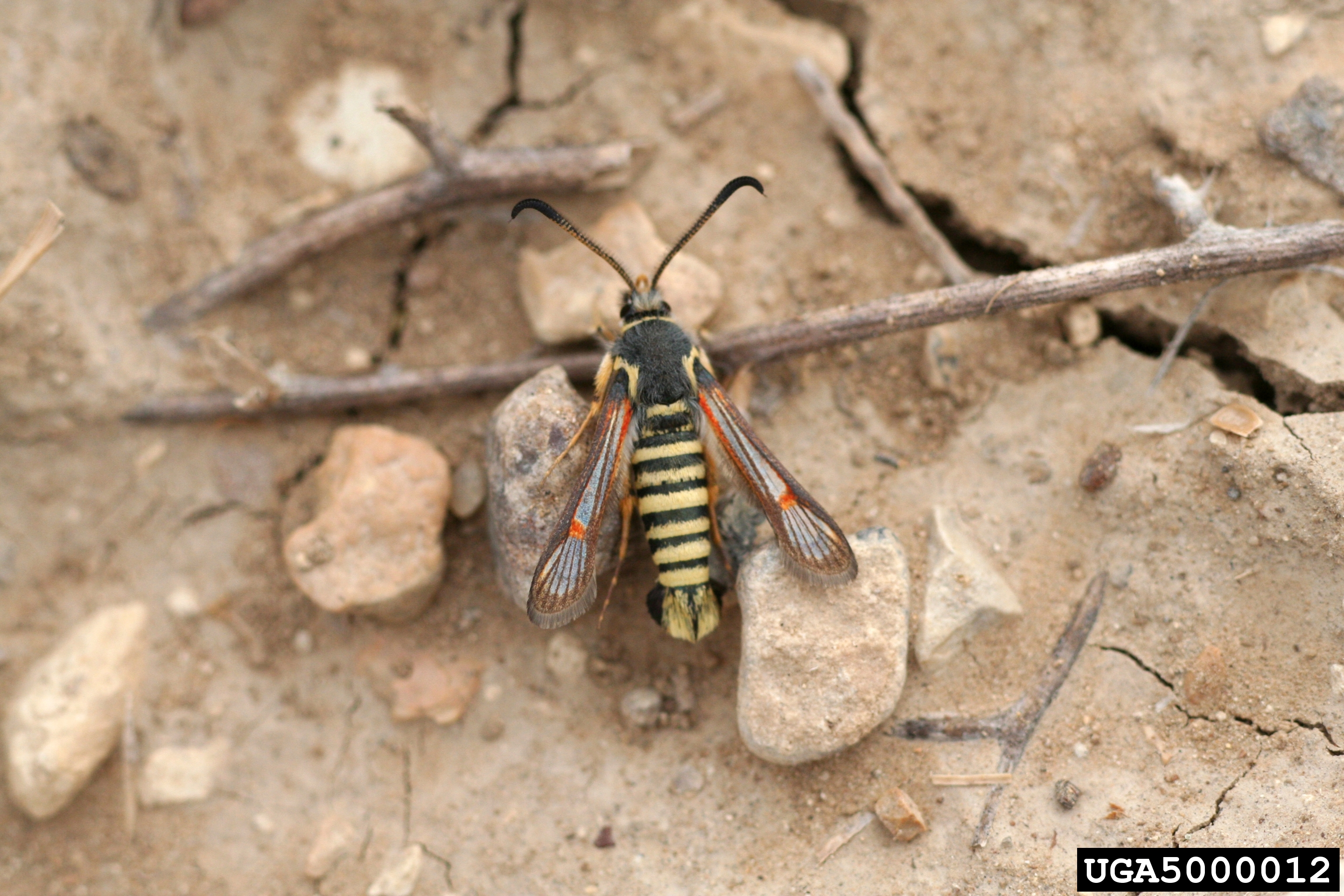

Scientific classification
- Kingdom: Animalia
- Phylum: Arthropoda
- Clade: Pancrustacea
- Class: Insecta
- Order: Lepidoptera
- Family: Sesiidae
- Genus: Carmenta
- Species: C. mimuli

Binomial name
- Carmenta mimuli (Edwards, 1881)

Synonyms
- Aegeria mimuli Edwards, 1881; Carmenta torrancia Engelhardt, 1946

= Carmenta mimuli =

Species of moth

Carmenta mimuli, the coronopus borer, is a moth of the family Sesiidae. The dark form is the typical form and is found in Arizona. The whitish form is non-typical and is known from the south-western United States, from Kansas to Arizona.

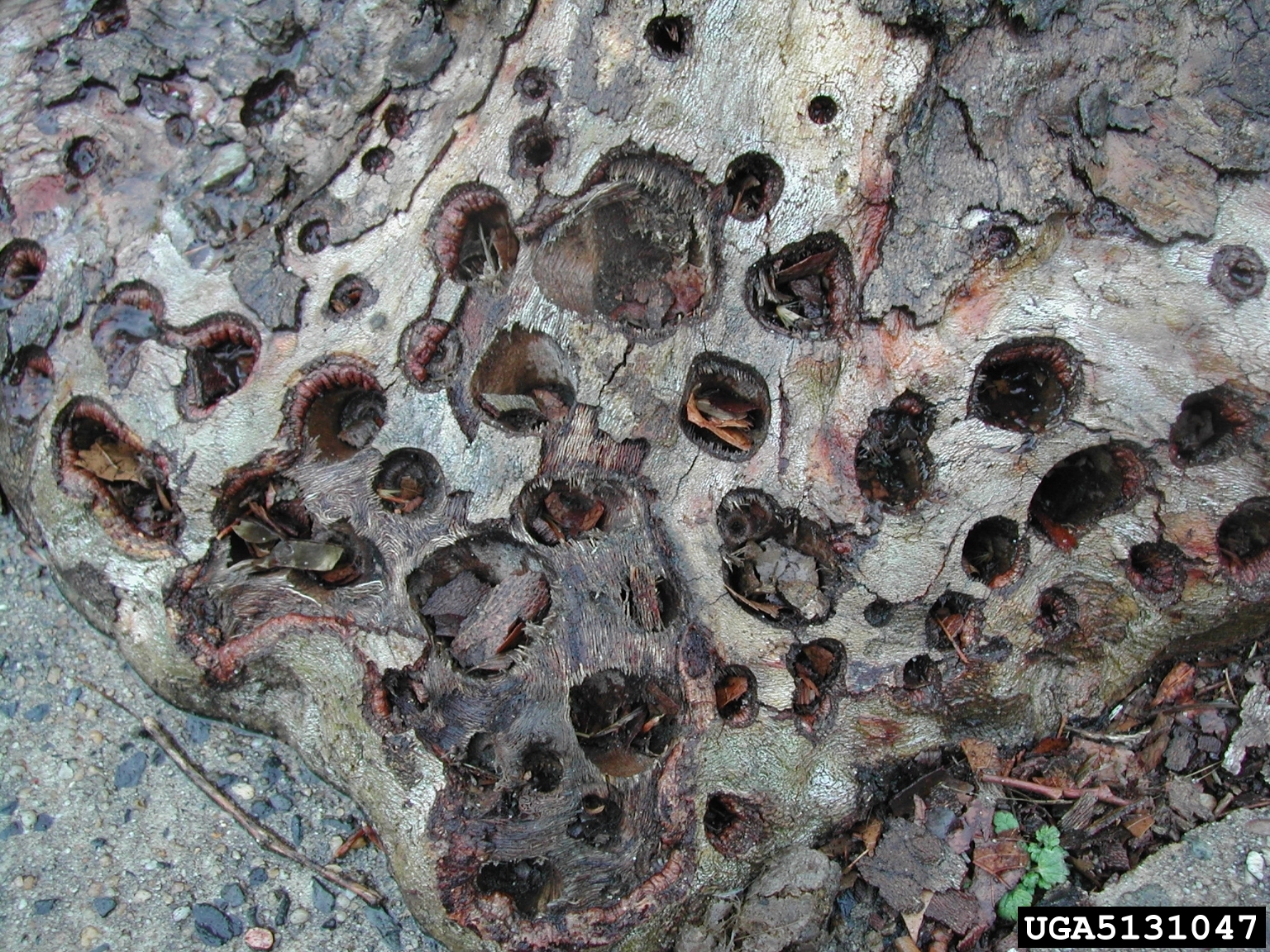
Damage

Adults are on wing from late April to November in south-eastern Arizona.

The larvae feed on perennial Solanaceae plants.
