= Fania nanus =

Scientific classification
- Domain: Eukaryota
- Kingdom: Animalia
- Phylum: Arthropoda
- Class: Insecta
- Order: Lepidoptera
- Family: Cossidae
- Genus: Fania
- Species: F. nanus

Binomial name
- Fania nanus (Strecker, 1876)

Synonyms
- Cossus nanus Strecker, 1876

Species of moth

Fania nanus is a moth in the family Cossidae. It was described by Strecker in 1876. It is found in North America, where it has been recorded from Arizona, Louisiana, Mississippi and Texas.

The wingspan is about 28 mm. Adults have been recorded on wing from May to August.
