= Caloreas multimarginata =

Scientific classification
- Kingdom: Animalia
- Phylum: Arthropoda
- Class: Insecta
- Order: Lepidoptera
- Family: Choreutidae
- Genus: Caloreas
- Species: C. multimarginata

Binomial name
- Caloreas multimarginata (Braun, 1925)

Synonyms
- Choreutis multimarginata Braun, 1925; Choreutis melanifera Keifer, 1937

Species of moth in the family Choreutidae

Caloreas multimarginata is a moth in the family Choreutidae. It was described by Annette Frances Braun in 1925. It is found in North America, where it has been recorded from Utah and California.
