= Carmenta wellerae =

Scientific classification
- Kingdom: Animalia
- Phylum: Arthropoda
- Clade: Pancrustacea
- Class: Insecta
- Order: Lepidoptera
- Family: Sesiidae
- Genus: Carmenta
- Species: C. wellerae

Binomial name
- Carmenta wellerae Duckworth & Eichlin, 1976

Species of moth

Carmenta wellerae is a moth of the family Sesiidae. It was described by W. Donald Duckworth and Thomas Drake Eichlin in 1976. It is known from southern Arizona in the US and northern Mexico. The habitat consists of mountains and foothills.

Adults are on wing from July to September.
