= Carmenta tildeni =

Scientific classification
- Kingdom: Animalia
- Phylum: Arthropoda
- Clade: Pancrustacea
- Class: Insecta
- Order: Lepidoptera
- Family: Sesiidae
- Genus: Carmenta
- Species: C. tildeni

Binomial name
- Carmenta tildeni Eichlin, 1995

Species of moth

Carmenta tildeni is a moth of the family Sesiidae. It was described by Thomas D. Eichlin in 1995, and is known from the United States, where it is found in Arizona and southern Texas, and from Mexico.

The wingspan is 8–10 mm for females.
