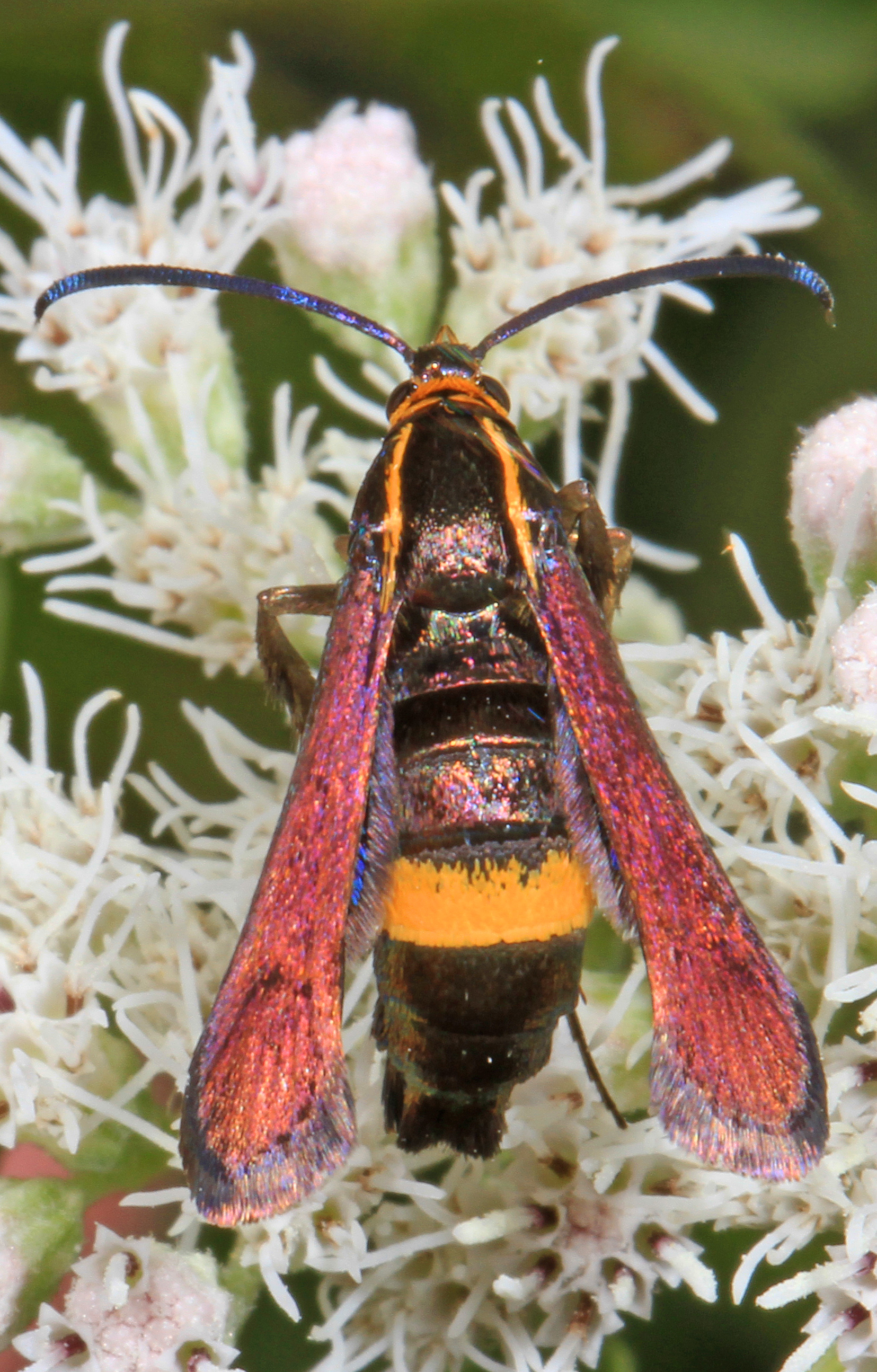

Scientific classification
- Kingdom: Animalia
- Phylum: Arthropoda
- Clade: Pancrustacea
- Class: Insecta
- Order: Lepidoptera
- Family: Sesiidae
- Genus: Carmenta
- Species: C. pyralidiformis

Binomial name
- Carmenta pyralidiformis (Walker, 1856)

Synonyms
- Aegeria pyralidiformis Walker 1856; Sesia nigella Hulst 1881; Carmenta pyralidiformis var. aurantis Engelhardt 1946

= Carmenta pyralidiformis =

Species of moth

Carmenta pyralidiformis, the boneset borer, is a moth of the family Sesiidae. It was described by Francis Walker in 1856. It is known from the United States, including Arkansas, Illinois, Maryland, Massachusetts, Michigan, Missouri, New Jersey, Ohio and Virginia.

The wingspan is about 21 mm.

The larvae feed on the roots of bonesets and thoroughworts (Eupatorium spp.).
