= Ellabella editha =

Scientific classification
- Domain: Eukaryota
- Kingdom: Animalia
- Phylum: Arthropoda
- Class: Insecta
- Order: Lepidoptera
- Family: Copromorphidae
- Genus: Ellabella
- Species: E. editha

Binomial name
- Ellabella editha Busck, 1925

Species of moth

Ellabella editha is a moth in the family Copromorphidae. It is found in North America, where it has been recorded from Alberta, British Columbia, Arizona, Colorado, New Mexico, Oregon, South Dakota, Texas, Utah, Washington and Wyoming.

The length of the forewings is 9.5–11 mm for males and 8-11.5 mm for females. The forewings are grey-brown, irrorated with white and in the apical and basal area along the costal margin. The hindwings are grey-brown. Adults are on wing from May to August.

The larvae possibly feed on Berberis repens.
