= Carmenta flaschkai =

Scientific classification
- Kingdom: Animalia
- Phylum: Arthropoda
- Clade: Pancrustacea
- Class: Insecta
- Order: Lepidoptera
- Family: Sesiidae
- Genus: Carmenta
- Species: C. flaschkai

Binomial name
- Carmenta flaschkai Eichlin, 1993

Species of moth

Carmenta flaschkai is a moth of the family Sesiidae. It was described by Eichlin in 1993. It is known from North America, including Texas.
