= George Paul Engelhardt =

American entomologist

- Born: Georg Karl Gottlieb Engelhardt; 23 November 1870; Hannover, Kingdom of Prussia
- Died: 23 May 1942 (aged 71); Scarsdale, New York
- Scientific career
- Fields: Entomology
- Institutions: Brooklyn Museum

George Paul Engelhardt (23 November 1870 – 23 May 1942) was a German-American entomologist who was curator of the Department of Natural Science at the Brooklyn Museum from 1920–30.

Engelhardt was born in 1870 in Hanover (then the Kingdom of Prussia), the son of Heinrich Engelhardt and Berta Heine. He was educated in Hanover and came to the United States as an emigrant in 1889, and became a citizen in 1897.

In 1902, he began working for the Brooklyn Museum, where he worked until his retirement in 1930. His keen interest was Aegeriidae, a family of moths. He was assisting younger generations of men, and educated them about the field, which generated a number of entomologists that came out due to his efforts, and one of them was Barnard D. Burks.

In 1942, he died of a heart attack at his home in Scarsdale, New York.

His book, American Clear-Wing Moths of the Family Aegeriidae, was published four years after his death.
