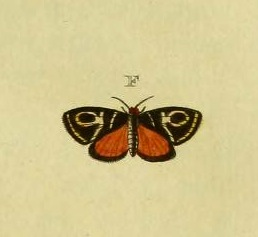
- Hemerophila albertiana

Scientific classification
- Kingdom: Animalia
- Phylum: Arthropoda
- Clade: Pancrustacea
- Class: Insecta
- Order: Lepidoptera
- Family: Choreutidae
- Subfamily: Choreutinae
- Genus: Hemerophila; Hübner [1817]

Synonyms
- Gauris Hübner, 1821; Walsinghamia Riley, 1889; Guaris Fernald, 1900 (misspelling)

= Hemerophila =

Genus of moths

Hemerophila was also erroneously used by Fernald in 1900 for the related genus Choreutis.

Hemerophila is a genus of moths in the family Choreutidae. A number of species was recently transferred to the genus Ornarantia.

== Species ==
- Hemerophila albertiana (Cramer, 1781) (from Venezuela, Brazil, Peru and Guyana)
- Hemerophila arcigera (Felder & Rogenhofer, 1875) (from Brazil)
- Hemerophila diva (Riley, 1889) (from Cuba & Florida)
- Hemerophila felis Walsingham, 1914 (from Mexico)
- Hemerophila houttuinialis (Cramer, 1782) (from Suriname)
- Hemerophila milliaria (Meyrick, 1922) (from Peru)
- Hemerophila musicosema (Meyrick, 1926) (from Bolivia)
- Hemerophila orinympha (Meyrick, 1926) (from Peru)
- Hemerophila triacmias (Meyrick, 1926) (from Colombia)

== Former species ==
- Hemerophila biferana (Walker, 1863)
- Hemerophila bigerana (Walker, 1863)
- Hemerophila canofusana (Walker, 1863)
- Hemerophila chorica (Meyrick, 1926)
- Hemerophila cinctipes (Felder & Rogenhofer, 1875)
- Hemerophila contrariana (Walker, 1863)
- Hemerophila contubernalis (Zeller, 1877)
- Hemerophila dyari Busck, 1900
- Hemerophila gradella Walsingham, 1914
- Hemerophila immarginata Walsingham, 1914
- Hemerophila laciniosella Busck, 1914
- Hemerophila merratella Busck, 1914
- Hemerophila ophiodesma (Meyrick, 1915)
- Hemerophila rimulalis (Zeller, 1875)
- Hemerophila scenophora (Meyrick, 1922)
- Hemerophila tristis (Felder & Rogenhofer, 1875)
- Hemerophila velatana (Walker, 1863)
- Hemerophila xutholopa Walsingham, 1914
