= Ornarantia crociella =

Scientific classification
- Kingdom: Animalia
- Phylum: Arthropoda
- Class: Insecta
- Order: Lepidoptera
- Family: Choreutidae
- Genus: Ornarantia
- Species: O. crociella

Binomial name
- Ornarantia crociella Rota, 2012

Species of moth

Ornarantia crociella is a moth in the family Choreutidae. It was described by Rota in 2012.
