= Hemerophila arcigera =

Scientific classification
- Domain: Eukaryota
- Kingdom: Animalia
- Phylum: Arthropoda
- Class: Insecta
- Order: Lepidoptera
- Family: Choreutidae
- Genus: Hemerophila
- Species: H. arcigera

Binomial name
- Hemerophila arcigera (C. Felder, R. Felder & Rogenhofer, 1875)

Synonyms
- Gauris arcigera Felder & Rogenhofer, 1875; Anthophila arcigera

Species of moth

Hemerophila arcigera is a moth in the family Choreutidae. It was described by Cajetan Felder, Rudolf Felder and Alois Friedrich Rogenhofer in 1875. It is found in Brazil.
