= Caloreas caliginosa =

Scientific classification
- Domain: Eukaryota
- Kingdom: Animalia
- Phylum: Arthropoda
- Class: Insecta
- Order: Lepidoptera
- Family: Choreutidae
- Genus: Caloreas
- Species: C. caliginosa

Binomial name
- Caloreas caliginosa (Braun, 1921)

Synonyms
- Choreutis caliginosa Braun, 1921

Species of moth

Caloreas caliginosa is a moth in the family Choreutidae. It was described by Annette Frances Braun in 1921. It is found in North America.
