= Hemerophila orinympha =

Scientific classification
- Kingdom: Animalia
- Phylum: Arthropoda
- Class: Insecta
- Order: Lepidoptera
- Family: Choreutidae
- Genus: Hemerophila
- Species: H. orinympha

Binomial name
- Hemerophila orinympha (Meyrick, 1926)

Synonyms
- Simaethis orinympha Meyrick, 1926

Species of moth

Hemerophila orinympha is a moth in the family Choreutidae. It was described by Edward Meyrick in 1926. It is found in Peru.
