= Saptha chrysoprasitis =

Scientific classification
- Kingdom: Animalia
- Phylum: Arthropoda
- Class: Insecta
- Order: Lepidoptera
- Family: Choreutidae
- Genus: Saptha
- Species: S. chrysoprasitis

Binomial name
- Saptha chrysoprasitis (Meyrick, 1936)

Synonyms
- Tortyra chrysoprasitis Meyrick, 1936

Species of moth

Saptha chrysoprasitis is a moth in the family Choreutidae. It was described by Edward Meyrick in 1936. It is found on the Solomon Islands.
