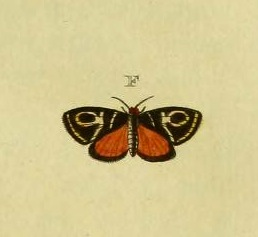

Scientific classification
- Kingdom: Animalia
- Phylum: Arthropoda
- Class: Insecta
- Order: Lepidoptera
- Family: Choreutidae
- Genus: Hemerophila
- Species: H. albertiana

Binomial name
- Hemerophila albertiana (Cramer, 1781)

Synonyms
- Phalaena (Tortrix) albertiana Cramer, 1781; Tortrix siphana Sepp, 1852; Anthophila zebra Walker, 1857

= Hemerophila albertiana =

Species of moth

Hemerophila albertiana is a moth in the family Choreutidae. It was described by Pieter Cramer in 1781. It is found in Venezuela, Brazil, Peru and Guyana.
