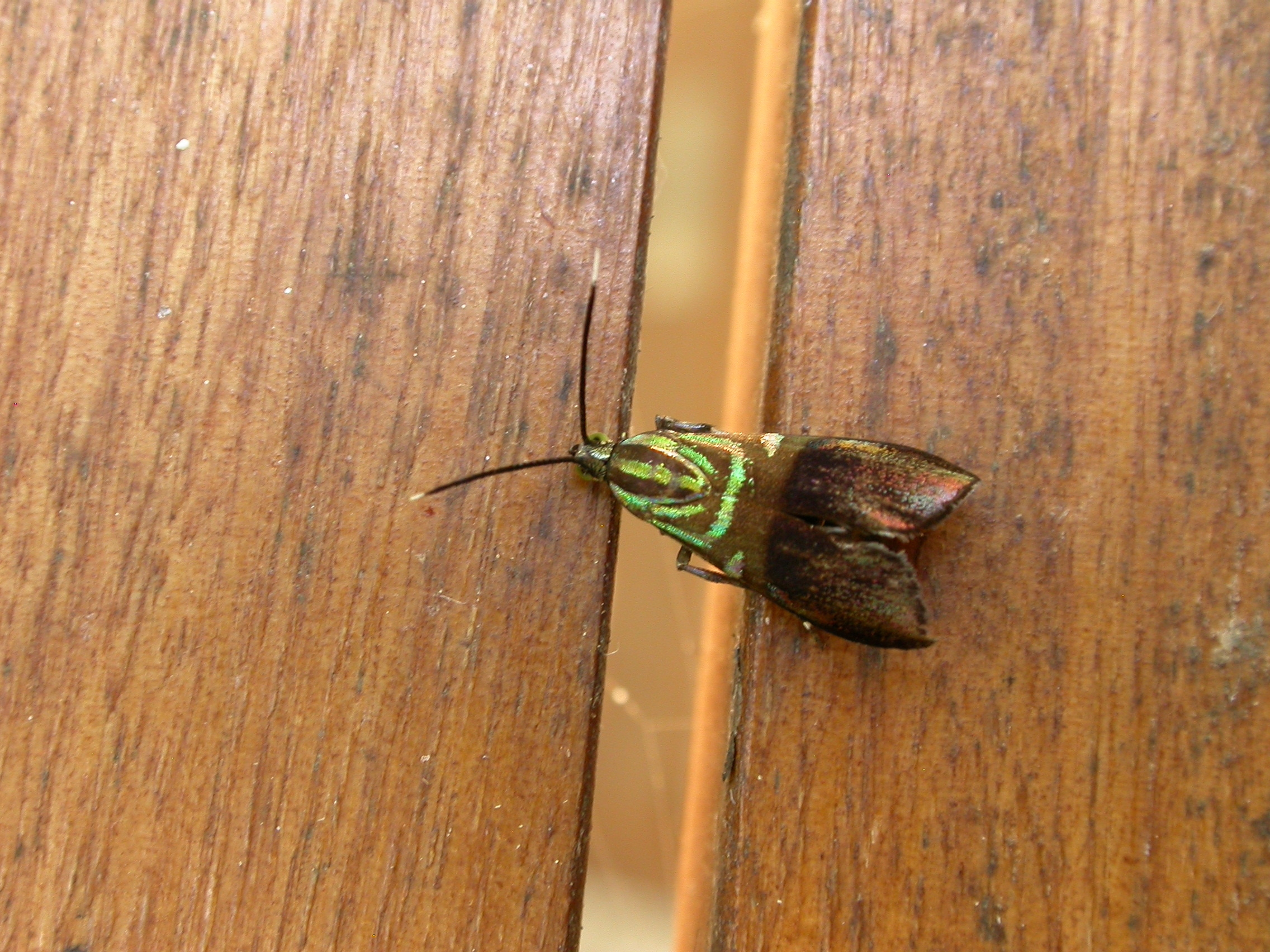

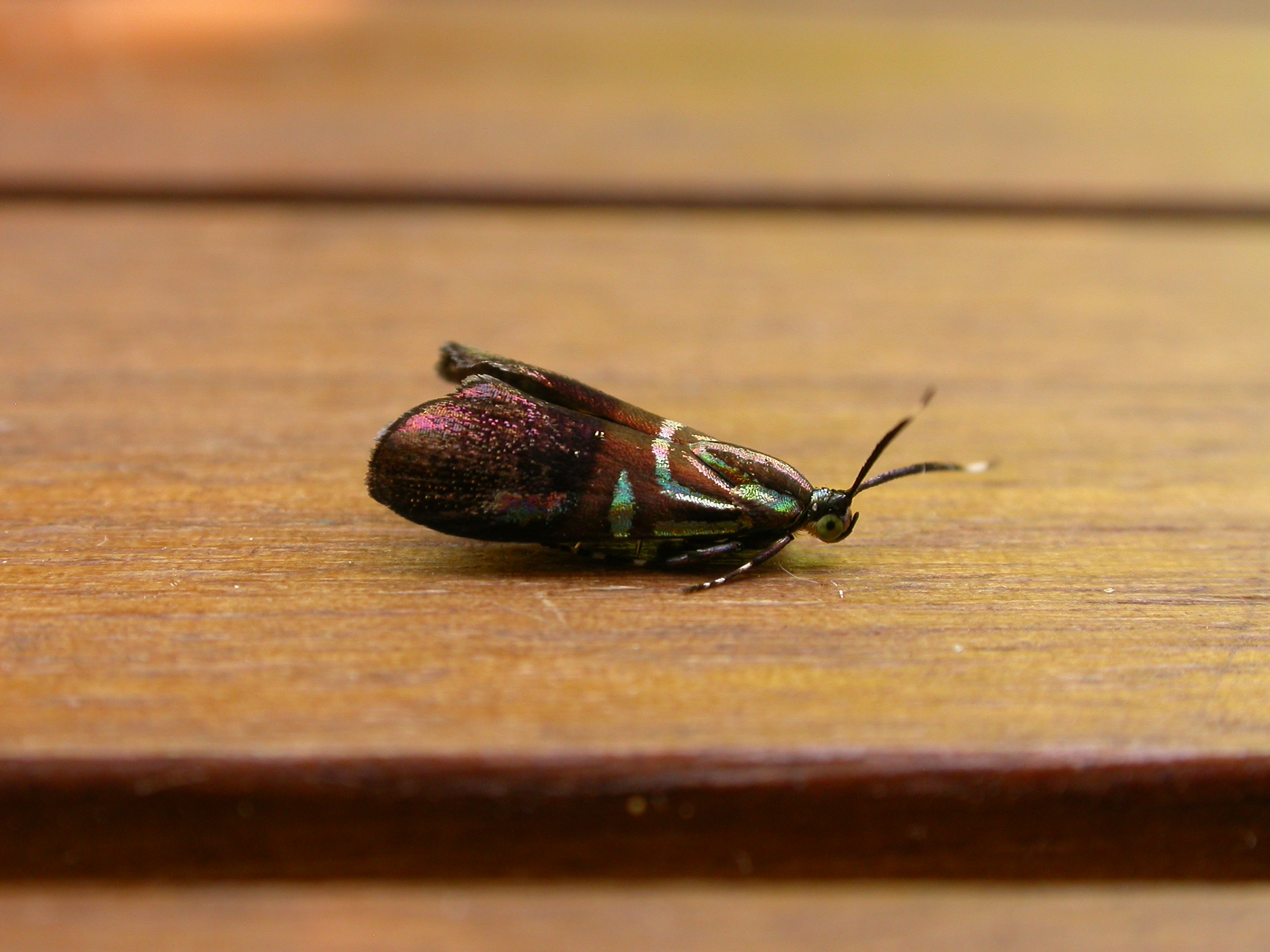

Scientific classification
- Kingdom: Animalia
- Phylum: Arthropoda
- Class: Insecta
- Order: Lepidoptera
- Family: Choreutidae
- Genus: Saptha
- Species: S. exanthista

Binomial name
- Saptha exanthista (Meyrick, 1910)

Synonyms
- Tortyra exanthista Meyrick, 1910

= Saptha exanthista =

Species of moth

Saptha exanthista is a species of moth of the family Choreutidae. It is found in the rainforests of north-eastern Queensland as well as New Guinea and Indonesia.
