= Caloreas blandinalis =

Scientific classification
- Kingdom: Animalia
- Phylum: Arthropoda
- Clade: Pancrustacea
- Class: Insecta
- Order: Lepidoptera
- Family: Choreutidae
- Genus: Caloreas
- Species: C. blandinalis

Binomial name
- Caloreas blandinalis (Zeller, 1877)

Synonyms
- Choreutis blandinalis Zeller, 1877

Species of moth

Caloreas blandinalis is a moth in the family Choreutidae. It was described by Zeller in 1877. It is found in Colombia.
