= Hemerophila milliaria =

Scientific classification
- Kingdom: Animalia
- Phylum: Arthropoda
- Class: Insecta
- Order: Lepidoptera
- Family: Choreutidae
- Genus: Hemerophila
- Species: H. milliaria

Binomial name
- Hemerophila milliaria (Meyrick, 1922)

Synonyms
- Simaethis milliaria Meyrick, 1922

Species of moth

Hemerophila milliaria is a moth in the family Choreutidae. It was described by Edward Meyrick in 1922. It is found in Peru.
