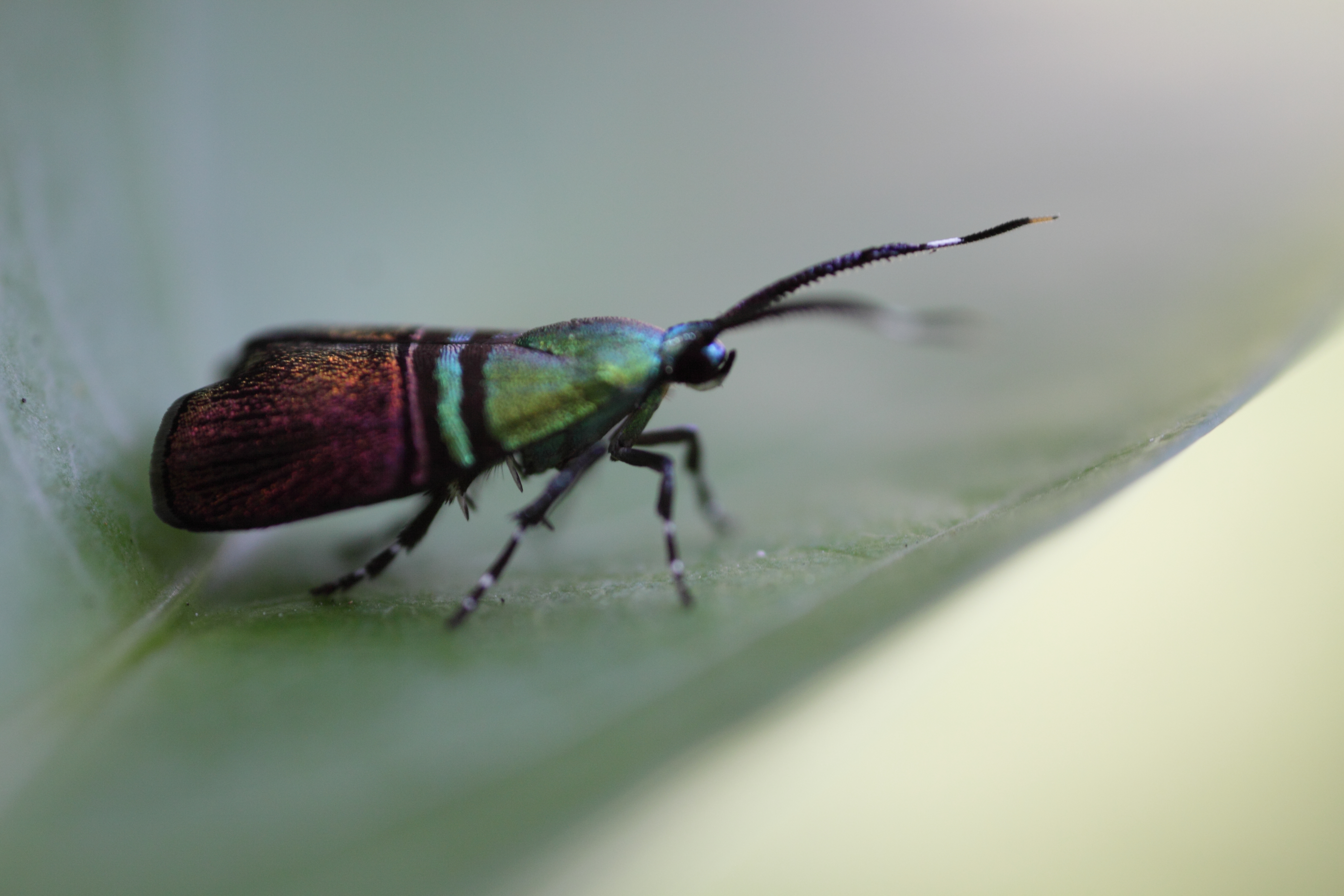

Scientific classification
- Kingdom: Animalia
- Phylum: Arthropoda
- Class: Insecta
- Order: Lepidoptera
- Family: Choreutidae
- Genus: Saptha
- Species: S. beryllitis

Binomial name
- Saptha beryllitis (Meyrick, 1910)

Synonyms
- Tortyra beryllitis Meyrick, 1910

= Saptha beryllitis =

Species of moth

Saptha beryllitis is a moth in the family Choreutidae. It was described by Edward Meyrick in 1910. It is found on Japan, Taiwan, and India's Nicobar Islands.
