= Caloreas occidentella =

Scientific classification
- Kingdom: Animalia
- Phylum: Arthropoda
- Class: Insecta
- Order: Lepidoptera
- Family: Choreutidae
- Genus: Caloreas
- Species: C. occidentella

Binomial name
- Caloreas occidentella (Dyar, 1900)

Synonyms
- Choreutis occidentella Dyar, 1900

Species of moth

Caloreas occidentella is a moth in the family Choreutidae. It was described by Harrison Gray Dyar Jr. in 1900. It is found in North America, where it has been recorded from Alberta and California.
