= Caloreas tacubayella =

Scientific classification
- Domain: Eukaryota
- Kingdom: Animalia
- Phylum: Arthropoda
- Class: Insecta
- Order: Lepidoptera
- Family: Choreutidae
- Genus: Caloreas
- Species: C. tacubayella

Binomial name
- Caloreas tacubayella (Kearfott, 1908)

Synonyms
- Choreutis tacubayella Kearfott, 1908

Species of moth

Caloreas tacubayella is a moth in the family Choreutidae. It was described by William D. Kearfott in 1908. It is found in Mexico.
