= Caloreas charmonica =

Scientific classification
- Domain: Eukaryota
- Kingdom: Animalia
- Phylum: Arthropoda
- Class: Insecta
- Order: Lepidoptera
- Family: Choreutidae
- Genus: Caloreas
- Species: C. charmonica

Binomial name
- Caloreas charmonica (Walsingham, 1914)

Synonyms
- Porpe charmonica Walsingham, 1914

Species of moth

Caloreas charmonica is a moth in the family Choreutidae. It was described by Walsingham in 1914. It is found in Mexico.
