= Caloreas coloradella =

Scientific classification
- Kingdom: Animalia
- Phylum: Arthropoda
- Class: Insecta
- Order: Lepidoptera
- Family: Choreutidae
- Genus: Caloreas
- Species: C. coloradella

Binomial name
- Caloreas coloradella (Dyar, 1900)

Synonyms
- Choreutis coloradella Dyar, 1900; Choreutis coloradella Kearfott, 1902

Species of moth

Caloreas coloradella is a moth in the family Choreutidae. It was described by Harrison Gray Dyar Jr. in 1900. It is found in North America, where it has been recorded from Colorado and New Mexico.
