= Hemerophila triacmias =

Scientific classification
- Domain: Eukaryota
- Kingdom: Animalia
- Phylum: Arthropoda
- Class: Insecta
- Order: Lepidoptera
- Family: Choreutidae
- Genus: Hemerophila
- Species: H. triacmias

Binomial name
- Hemerophila triacmias (Meyrick, 1926)

Synonyms
- Simaethis triacmias Meyrick, 1926

Species of moth

Hemerophila triacmias is a moth in the family Choreutidae. It was described by Edward Meyrick in 1926. It is found in Colombia.
