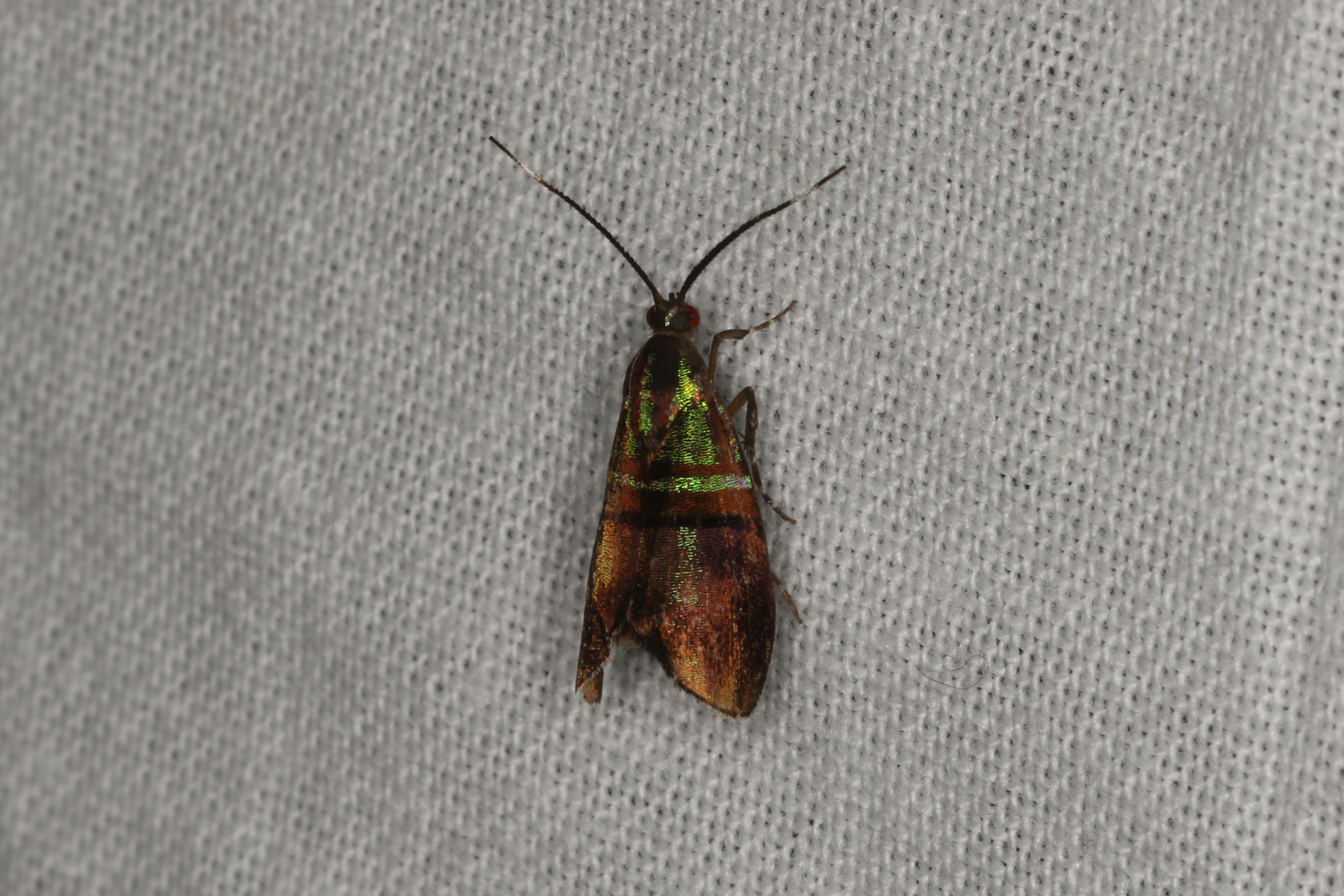
- Palm Cove, Queensland, 17 January 2016

Scientific classification
- Kingdom: Animalia
- Phylum: Arthropoda
- Class: Insecta
- Order: Lepidoptera
- Family: Choreutidae
- Genus: Saptha
- Species: S. libanota

Binomial name
- Saptha libanota (Meyrick, 1910)

Synonyms
- Tortyra libanota Meyrick, 1910; Tortyra sybaritis Meyrick, 1912

= Saptha libanota =

Species of moth

Saptha libanota is a species of moth of the family Choreutidae. It is found in northern Queensland.

== Gallery ==
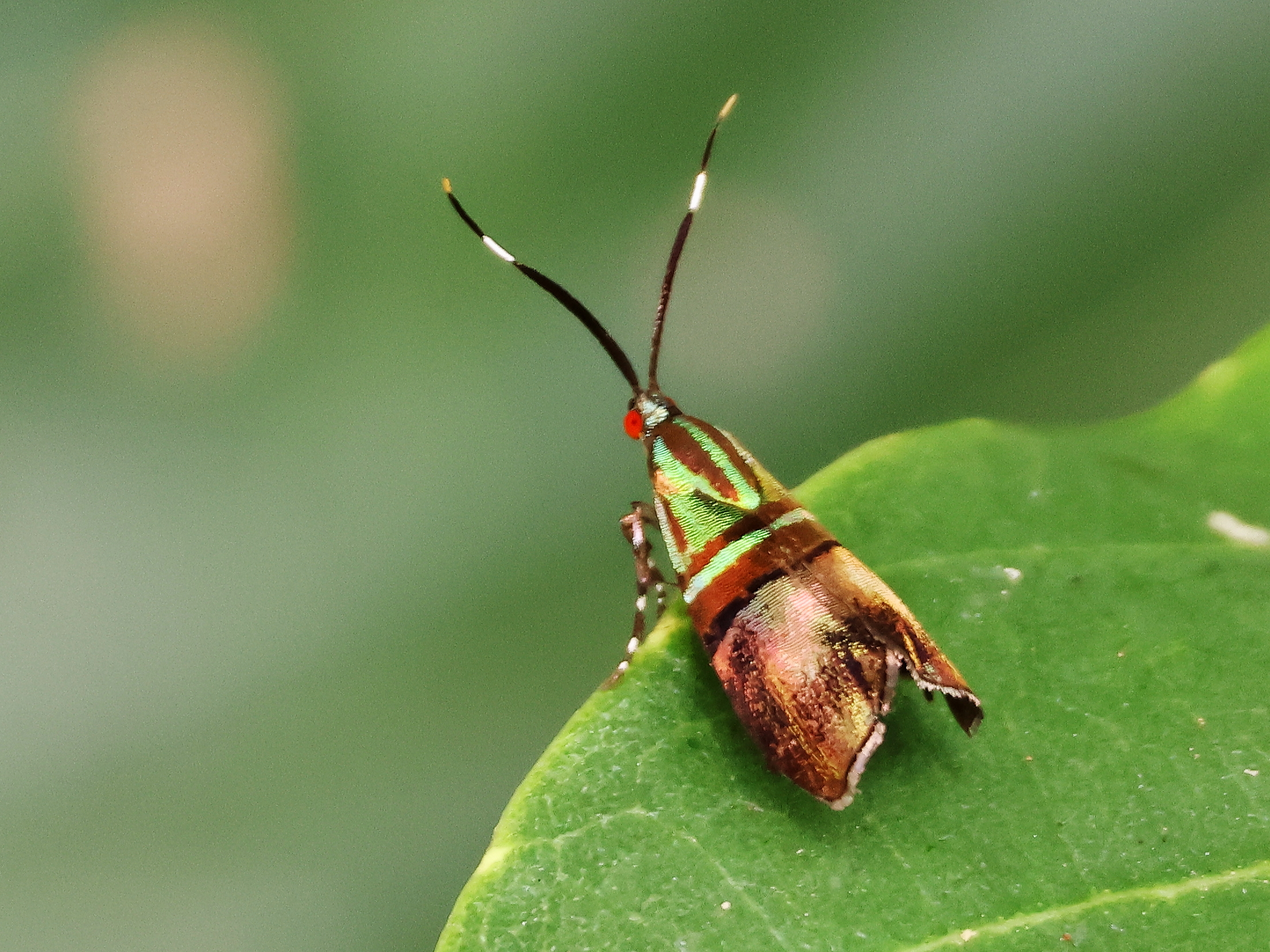
Cairns, Queensland
