= Hemerophila diva =

Scientific classification
- Kingdom: Animalia
- Phylum: Arthropoda
- Class: Insecta
- Order: Lepidoptera
- Family: Choreutidae
- Genus: Hemerophila
- Species: H. diva

Binomial name
- Hemerophila diva (Riley, 1889)

Synonyms
- Walsinghamia diva Riley, 1889

Species of moth

Hemerophila diva, the Diva Hemerophila moth, is a moth in the family Choreutidae. It was described by Riley in 1889. It is found in Florida and Cuba.

The larvae feed on Ficus species, including Ficus citrifolia. They curl the leaves of their host plant and skeletonize the surface.
