= Saptha tabularia =

Scientific classification
- Kingdom: Animalia
- Phylum: Arthropoda
- Class: Insecta
- Order: Lepidoptera
- Family: Choreutidae
- Genus: Saptha
- Species: S. tabularia

Binomial name
- Saptha tabularia (Meyrick, 1912)

Synonyms
- Tortyra tabularia Meyrick, 1912

Species of moth

Saptha tabularia is a moth in the family Choreutidae. It was described by Edward Meyrick in 1912. It is found on the Loyalty Islands of New Caledonia.
