= Caloreas schausiella =

Scientific classification
- Domain: Eukaryota
- Kingdom: Animalia
- Phylum: Arthropoda
- Class: Insecta
- Order: Lepidoptera
- Family: Choreutidae
- Genus: Caloreas
- Species: C. schausiella

Binomial name
- Caloreas schausiella (Busck, 1907)

Synonyms
- Choreutis schausiella Busck, 1907

Species of moth

Caloreas schausiella is a moth in the family Choreutidae. It was described by August Busck in 1907. It is found in North America, where it has been recorded from New Mexico.
