= Saptha macrospila =

Scientific classification
- Domain: Eukaryota
- Kingdom: Animalia
- Phylum: Arthropoda
- Class: Insecta
- Order: Lepidoptera
- Family: Choreutidae
- Genus: Saptha
- Species: S. macrospila

Binomial name
- Saptha macrospila (Diakonoff, 1968)

Synonyms
- Tortyra macrospila Diakonoff, 1968

Species of moth

Saptha macrospila is a moth in the family Choreutidae. It was described by Alexey Diakonoff in 1968. It is found in the Philippines.
