= Caloreas enantia =

Scientific classification
- Domain: Eukaryota
- Kingdom: Animalia
- Phylum: Arthropoda
- Class: Insecta
- Order: Lepidoptera
- Family: Choreutidae
- Genus: Caloreas
- Species: C. enantia

Binomial name
- Caloreas enantia (Walsingham, 1914)

Synonyms
- Porpe enantia Walsingham, 1914; Choreutis enantia

Species of moth

Caloreas enantia is a moth in the family Choreutidae. It was described by Walsingham in 1914. It is found in Central America.
