= Caloreas leucobasis =

Scientific classification
- Kingdom: Animalia
- Phylum: Arthropoda
- Clade: Pancrustacea
- Class: Insecta
- Order: Lepidoptera
- Family: Choreutidae
- Genus: Caloreas
- Species: C. leucobasis

Binomial name
- Caloreas leucobasis (Dyar, 1900)

Synonyms
- Choreutis leucobasis Dyar, 1900

Species of moth

Caloreas leucobasis is a moth of the family Choreutidae. It is found in North America, including Oregon, Quebec, Ontario, Alberta and California.

In Canada, adults have been recorded from mid May to early July.
