= Saptha elegans =

Scientific classification
- Kingdom: Animalia
- Phylum: Arthropoda
- Clade: Pancrustacea
- Class: Insecta
- Order: Lepidoptera
- Family: Choreutidae
- Genus: Saptha
- Species: S. elegans

Binomial name
- Saptha elegans Walsingham, 1900

Species of moth

Saptha elegans is a moth in the family Choreutidae. It was described by Walsingham in 1900. It is found in India, Sri Lanka and on the Andaman Islands.
