= Saptha pretiosa =

Scientific classification
- Kingdom: Animalia
- Phylum: Arthropoda
- Class: Insecta
- Order: Lepidoptera
- Family: Choreutidae
- Genus: Saptha
- Species: S. pretiosa

Binomial name
- Saptha pretiosa (Walker, 1866)

Synonyms
- Badera pretiosa Walker, 1866

Species of moth

Saptha pretiosa is a moth in the family Choreutidae. It was described by Francis Walker in 1866. It is found on Java in Indonesia.
