= Hemerophila musicosema =

Scientific classification
- Kingdom: Animalia
- Phylum: Arthropoda
- Class: Insecta
- Order: Lepidoptera
- Family: Choreutidae
- Genus: Hemerophila
- Species: H. musicosema

Binomial name
- Hemerophila musicosema (Meyrick, 1926)

Synonyms
- Simaethis musicosema Meyrick, 1926; Anthophila musicosema

Species of moth

Hemerophila musicosema is a moth in the family Choreutidae. It was described by Edward Meyrick in 1926. It is found in Bolivia.
