= Rhobonda gaurisana =

Scientific classification
- Kingdom: Animalia
- Phylum: Arthropoda
- Class: Insecta
- Order: Lepidoptera
- Family: Choreutidae
- Genus: Rhobonda
- Species: R. gaurisana

Binomial name
- Rhobonda gaurisana Walker, 1863

Species of moth

Rhobonda gaurisana is a moth in the family Choreutidae. It was described by Francis Walker in 1863. It is found from Brazil to Costa Rica.

Adults are sexually dimorphic, differing in coloration of the hindwing.
