= Caloreas pelinobasis =

Scientific classification
- Domain: Eukaryota
- Kingdom: Animalia
- Phylum: Arthropoda
- Class: Insecta
- Order: Lepidoptera
- Family: Choreutidae
- Genus: Caloreas
- Species: C. pelinobasis

Binomial name
- Caloreas pelinobasis (Walsingham, 1914)

Synonyms
- Porpe pelinobasis Walsingham, 1914; Choreutis pelinobasis

Species of moth

Caloreas pelinobasis is a moth in the family Choreutidae. It was described by Walsingham in 1914. It is found in Central America.
