= Caloreas apocynoglossa =

Scientific classification
- Kingdom: Animalia
- Phylum: Arthropoda
- Clade: Pancrustacea
- Class: Insecta
- Order: Lepidoptera
- Family: Choreutidae
- Genus: Caloreas
- Species: C. apocynoglossa

Binomial name
- Caloreas apocynoglossa (Heppner, 1976)

Synonyms
- Choreutis apocynoglossa Heppner, 1976

Species of moth

Caloreas apocynoglossa is a moth of the family Choreutidae. It is known from North America, including California.
