= Caloreas cydrota =

Scientific classification
- Kingdom: Animalia
- Phylum: Arthropoda
- Class: Insecta
- Order: Lepidoptera
- Family: Choreutidae
- Genus: Caloreas
- Species: C. cydrota

Binomial name
- Caloreas cydrota (Meyrick, 1915)

Synonyms
- Choreutis cydrota Meyrick, 1915

Species of moth

Caloreas cydrota is a moth in the family Choreutidae. It was described by Edward Meyrick in 1915. It is found in Colombia. According to a study in the Brazilian Journal of Biology, the species has also been noted to be naturally occurring in Brazil.
