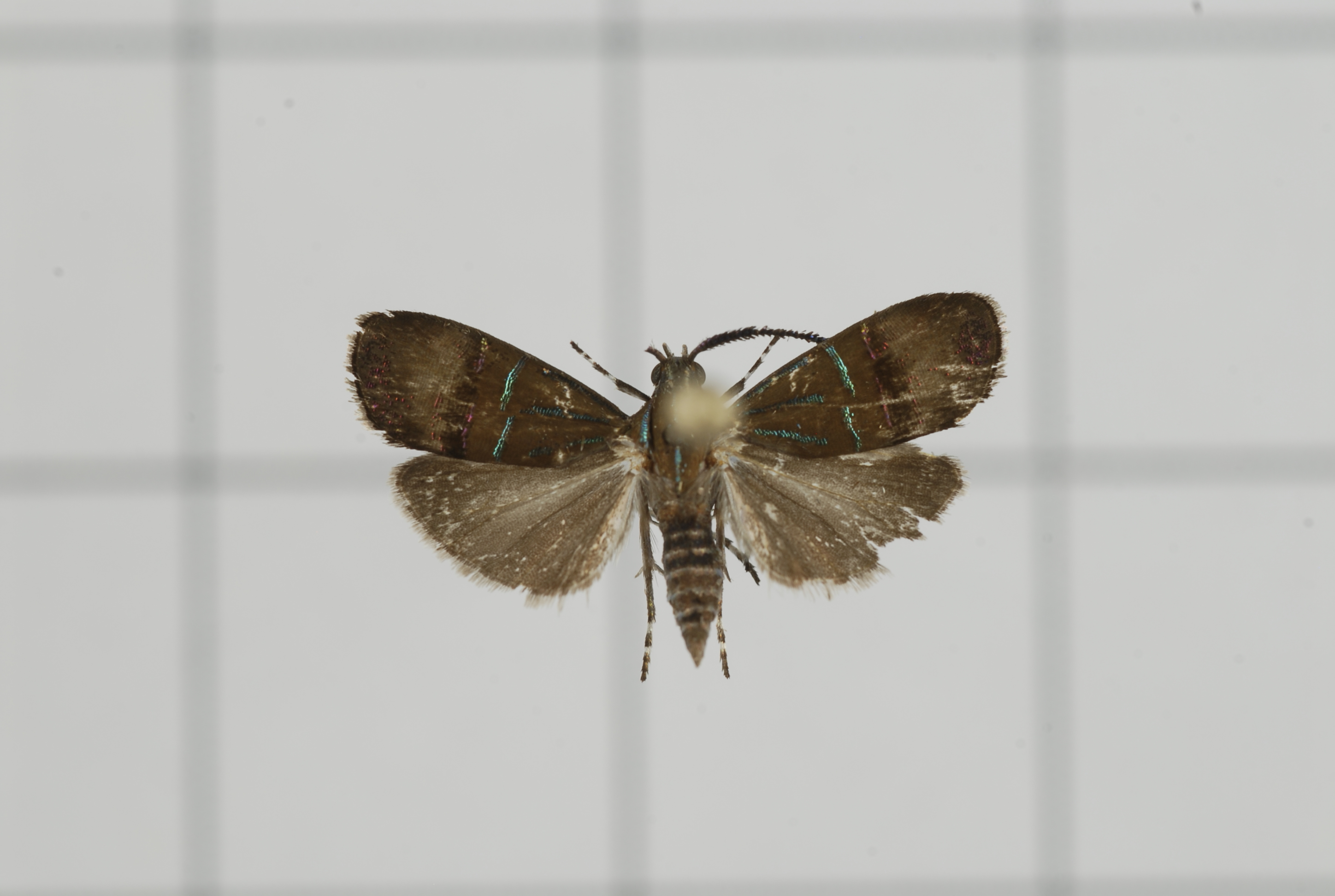

Scientific classification
- Kingdom: Animalia
- Phylum: Arthropoda
- Class: Insecta
- Order: Lepidoptera
- Family: Choreutidae
- Genus: Saptha
- Species: S. angustistriata

Binomial name
- Saptha angustistriata (Issiki, 1930)

Synonyms
- Tortyra angustistriata Issiki, 1930

= Saptha angustistriata =

Species of moth

Saptha angustistriata is a moth in the family Choreutidae. It was described by Syuti Issiki in 1930. It is found in Taiwan.
