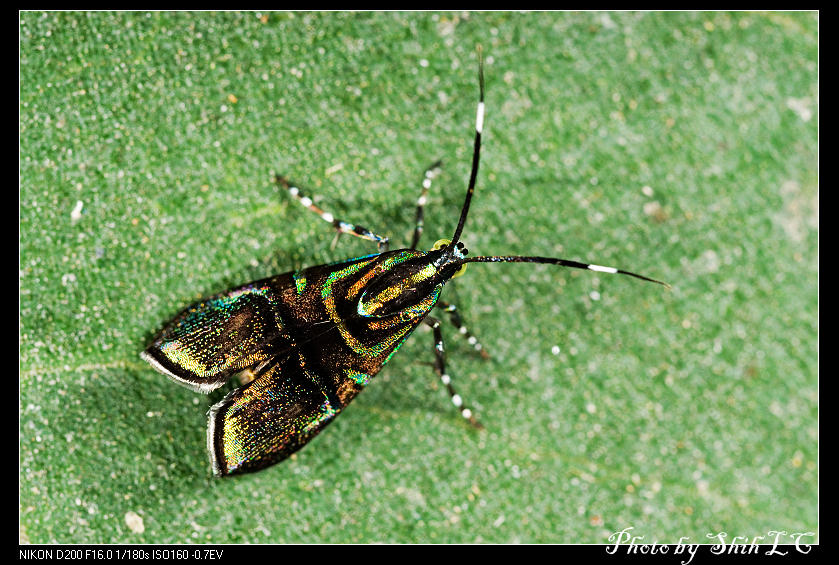

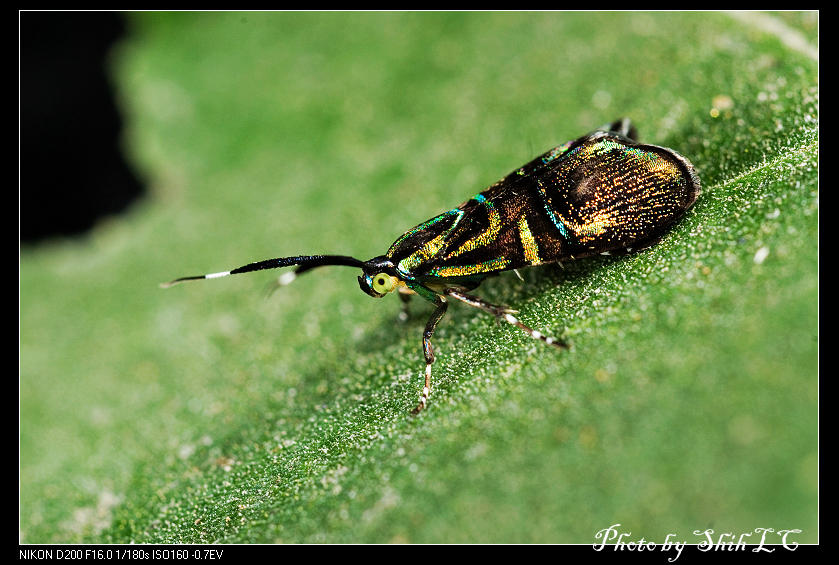

Scientific classification
- Kingdom: Animalia
- Phylum: Arthropoda
- Class: Insecta
- Order: Lepidoptera
- Family: Choreutidae
- Genus: Saptha
- Species: S. divitiosa

Binomial name
- Saptha divitiosa Walker, 1864

Synonyms
- Badera prodigella Walker, 1866; Badera nobilis Felder and Rogenhofer, 1875

= Saptha divitiosa =

Species of moth

Saptha divitiosa is a moth in the family Choreutidae. It was described by Francis Walker in 1864. It is found on Seram and Ambon islands in Indonesia.
