= Saptha iridopa =

Scientific classification
- Kingdom: Animalia
- Phylum: Arthropoda
- Class: Insecta
- Order: Lepidoptera
- Family: Choreutidae
- Genus: Saptha
- Species: S. iridopa

Binomial name
- Saptha iridopa (Meyrick, 1907)

Synonyms
- Tortyra iridopa Meyrick, 1907

Species of moth

Saptha iridopa is a moth in the family Choreutidae. It was described by Edward Meyrick in 1907. It is found on the Solomon Islands.
