= Hemerophila felis =

Scientific classification
- Domain: Eukaryota
- Kingdom: Animalia
- Phylum: Arthropoda
- Class: Insecta
- Order: Lepidoptera
- Family: Choreutidae
- Genus: Hemerophila
- Species: H. felis

Binomial name
- Hemerophila felis Walsingham, 1914

Species of moth

Hemerophila felis is a moth in the family Choreutidae. It was described by Thomas de Grey, 6th Baron Walsingham, in 1914. It is found in Mexico.
