= Rhobonda heliaspis =

Scientific classification
- Kingdom: Animalia
- Phylum: Arthropoda
- Class: Insecta
- Order: Lepidoptera
- Family: Choreutidae
- Genus: Rhobonda
- Species: R. heliaspis

Binomial name
- Rhobonda heliaspis (Meyrick, 1926)

Synonyms
- Tortyra heliaspis Meyrick, 1926

Species of moth

Rhobonda heliaspis is a moth in the family Choreutidae. It was described by Edward Meyrick in 1926. It is found in Bolivia.
