= Saptha cypridia =

Scientific classification
- Kingdom: Animalia
- Phylum: Arthropoda
- Class: Insecta
- Order: Lepidoptera
- Family: Choreutidae
- Genus: Saptha
- Species: S. cypridia

Binomial name
- Saptha cypridia (Meyrick, 1910)

Synonyms
- Tortyra cypridia Meyrick, 1910

Species of moth

Saptha cypridia is a moth in the family Choreutidae. It was described by Edward Meyrick in 1910. It is found on Borneo.
