= Caloreas augustella =

Scientific classification
- Domain: Eukaryota
- Kingdom: Animalia
- Phylum: Arthropoda
- Class: Insecta
- Order: Lepidoptera
- Family: Choreutidae
- Genus: Caloreas
- Species: C. augustella

Binomial name
- Caloreas augustella (Clarke, 1933)

Synonyms
- Choreutis augustella Clarke, 1933

Species of moth

Caloreas augustella is a moth in the family Choreutidae. It was described by Clarke in 1933. It is found in North America, where it has been recorded from Washington.
