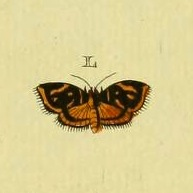

Scientific classification
- Kingdom: Animalia
- Phylum: Arthropoda
- Class: Insecta
- Order: Lepidoptera
- Family: Choreutidae
- Genus: Hemerophila
- Species: H. houttuinialis

Binomial name
- Hemerophila houttuinialis (Cramer, 1782)

Synonyms
- Phalaena (Pyralis) houttuinialis Cramer, 1782

= Hemerophila houttuinialis =

Species of moth

Hemerophila houttuinialis is a moth in the family Choreutidae. It was described by Pieter Cramer in 1782. It is found in Suriname.
