= Saptha pronubana =

Scientific classification
- Kingdom: Animalia
- Phylum: Arthropoda
- Class: Insecta
- Order: Lepidoptera
- Family: Choreutidae
- Genus: Saptha
- Species: S. pronubana

Binomial name
- Saptha pronubana (Snellen, 1877)

Synonyms
- Simaethis pronubana Snellen, 1877

Species of moth

Saptha pronubana is a moth in the family Choreutidae. It was described by Snellen in 1877. It is found on Java and Sulawesi.
