= Caloreas hymenaea =

Scientific classification
- Kingdom: Animalia
- Phylum: Arthropoda
- Class: Insecta
- Order: Lepidoptera
- Family: Choreutidae
- Genus: Caloreas
- Species: C. hymenaea

Binomial name
- Caloreas hymenaea (Meyrick, 1909)

Synonyms
- Choreutis hymenaea Meyrick, 1909

Species of moth

Caloreas hymenaea is a moth in the family Choreutidae. It was described by Edward Meyrick in 1909. It is found in Bolivia.
