= Saptha aeolodoxa =

Scientific classification
- Kingdom: Animalia
- Phylum: Arthropoda
- Class: Insecta
- Order: Lepidoptera
- Family: Choreutidae
- Genus: Saptha
- Species: S. aeolodoxa

Binomial name
- Saptha aeolodoxa (Meyrick, 1928)

Synonyms
- Tortyra aeolodoxa Meyrick, 1928

Species of moth

Saptha aeolodoxa is a moth in the family Choreutidae. It was described by Edward Meyrick in 1928. It is found on India's Andaman Islands.
