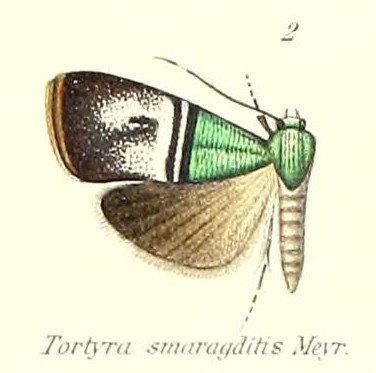

Scientific classification
- Kingdom: Animalia
- Phylum: Arthropoda
- Class: Insecta
- Order: Lepidoptera
- Family: Choreutidae
- Genus: Saptha
- Species: S. smaragditis

Binomial name
- Saptha smaragditis Meyrick, 1905

Synonyms
- Tortyra centrifuga Meyrick, 1912; Tortyra smaragditis Meyrick, 1912

= Saptha smaragditis =

Species of moth

Saptha smaragditis is a moth in the family Choreutidae. It was described by Edward Meyrick in 1905.

== Description ==
=== Original Description ===
Meyrick, 1905. Journal of the Bombay Natural History Society 16: 610-611

== Distribution ==
It is found in Sri Lanka; India; Sulawesi; Myanmar (Burma); Thailand; Borneo and Ambon (Maluku Islands, Indonesia).

== Ecology ==
=== Larval Host Plant ===
Unknown.

=== Habitat ===
Observations of adult moths from Sri Lanka in 2011 & 2021 were from forest fragments in urban areas. The elevational range is lowland to montane (1500m).

=== Activity ===
The adult moths are both diurnal and nocturnal.

=== Phenology ===
The known temporal occurrence of each stage of the life cycle across the geographic distribution of S. smaragditis is as follows:

life stage	Sri Lanka	India	Myanmar	Thailand	Borneo	Sulawesi	Ambon
ovum	no data	no data	no data	no data	no data	no data	no data
1st instar larva	no data	no data	no data	no data	no data	no data	no data
2nd instar	no data	no data	no data	no data	no data	no data	no data
3rd instar	no data	no data	no data	no data	no data	no data	no data
4th instar	no data	no data	no data	no data	no data	no data	no data
5th instar	no data	no data	no data	no data	no data	no data	no data
pupa	no data	no data	no data	no data	no data	no data	no data
imago	March, April; Aug. & Sept.	Nov. & Dec.	no data	no data	no data	no data	no data
possible voltinism	bivoltine	univoltine	no data	no data	no data	no data	no data

== Conservation status ==
=== IUCN Red List ===
Not evaluated (NE).
