= Ornarantia meratella =

Scientific classification
- Domain: Eukaryota
- Kingdom: Animalia
- Phylum: Arthropoda
- Class: Insecta
- Order: Lepidoptera
- Family: Choreutidae
- Genus: Ornarantia
- Species: O. meratella

Binomial name
- Ornarantia meratella (Busck, 1914)

Synonyms
- Hemerophila meratella Busck, 1914; Tortyra meratella

Species of moth

Ornarantia meratella is a moth in the family Choreutidae. It was described by August Busck in 1914. It is found in Panama.
