= Ornarantia contubernalis =

Scientific classification
- Kingdom: Animalia
- Phylum: Arthropoda
- Clade: Pancrustacea
- Class: Insecta
- Order: Lepidoptera
- Family: Choreutidae
- Genus: Ornarantia
- Species: O. contubernalis

Binomial name
- Ornarantia contubernalis (Zeller, 1877)

Synonyms
- Simaethis contubernalis Zeller, 1877; Tortyra contubernalis; Hemerophila contubernalis

Species of moth

Ornarantia contubernalis is a moth in the family Choreutidae. It was described by Zeller in 1877.
