= Ornarantia gradella =

Scientific classification
- Domain: Eukaryota
- Kingdom: Animalia
- Phylum: Arthropoda
- Class: Insecta
- Order: Lepidoptera
- Family: Choreutidae
- Genus: Ornarantia
- Species: O. gradella

Binomial name
- Ornarantia gradella (Walsingham, 1914)

Synonyms
- Hemerophila gradella Walsingham, 1914

Species of moth

Ornarantia gradella is a moth in the family Choreutidae. It was described by Walsingham in 1914. It is found in Guatemala.
