= Rhobonda =

Scientific classification
- Kingdom: Animalia
- Phylum: Arthropoda
- Class: Insecta
- Order: Lepidoptera
- Family: Choreutidae
- Genus: Rhobonda; Walker, 1863

Genus of moths

Rhobonda is a genus of moths in the family Choreutidae.

== Species ==
- Rhobonda gaurisana Walker, 1863
- Rhobonda heliaspis (Meyrick, 1926)
- Rhobonda palaeocosma (Meyrick, 1926)
