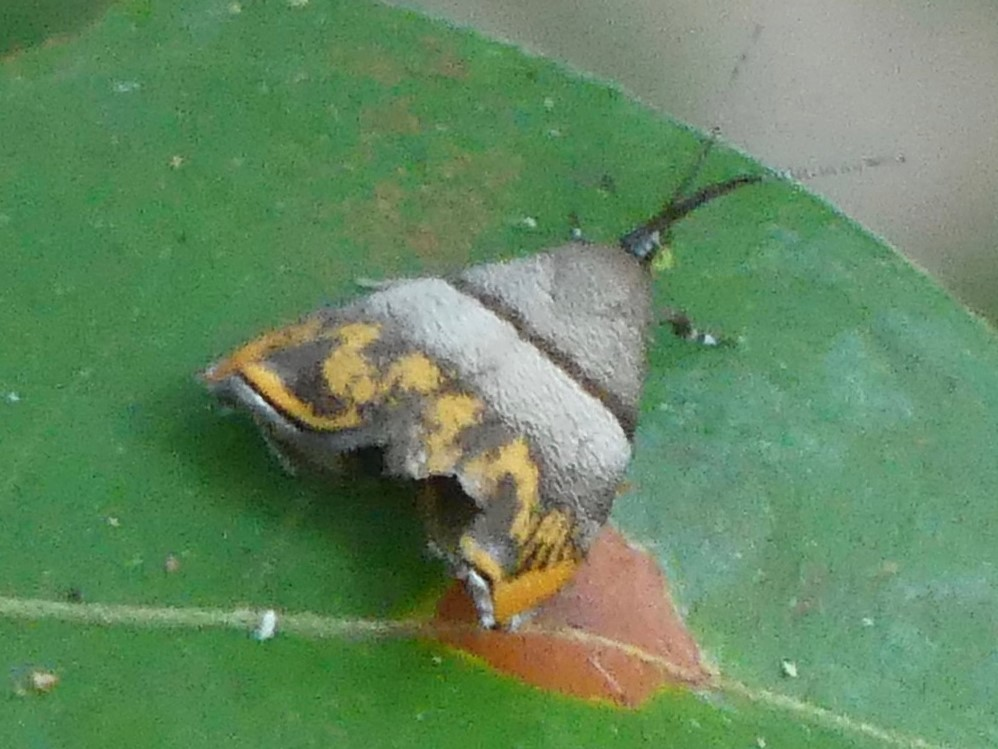

Scientific classification
- Kingdom: Animalia
- Phylum: Arthropoda
- Class: Insecta
- Order: Lepidoptera
- Family: Choreutidae
- Genus: Ornarantia
- Species: O. bigerana

Binomial name
- Ornarantia bigerana (Walker, 1863)

Synonyms
- Gauris bigerana Walker, 1863; Hemerophila bigerana

= Ornarantia bigerana =

Species of moth

Ornarantia bigerana is a species of moth in the family Choreutidae. It was first described by Francis Walker in 1863. It is found in Brazil.
