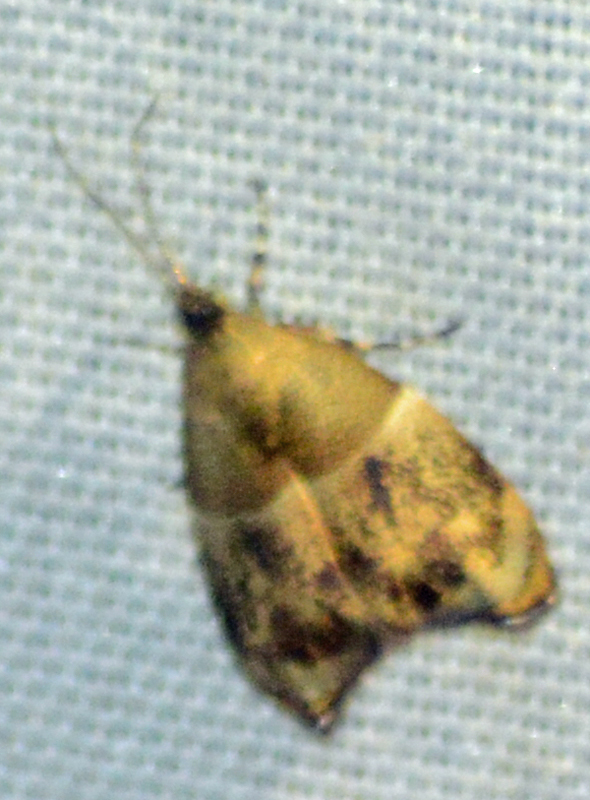

Scientific classification
- Kingdom: Animalia
- Phylum: Arthropoda
- Class: Insecta
- Order: Lepidoptera
- Family: Choreutidae
- Genus: Ornarantia
- Species: O. dyari

Binomial name
- Ornarantia dyari (Busck, 1900)

Synonyms
- Hemerophila dyari Busck, 1900

= Ornarantia dyari =

Species of moth

Ornarantia dyari is a species of moth in the family Choreutidae. It was first described by August Busck in 1900. It is found in Florida and on the Bahamas. The species name honors entomologist Harrison Gray Dyar Jr.

The length of the forewings is 6.2 mm for males and 7.7 mm for females. Adults are on wing in January, March and April in Florida and in July in the Bahamas.

The larvae feed on Ficus species. They skeletonize the leaves of their host plant.
