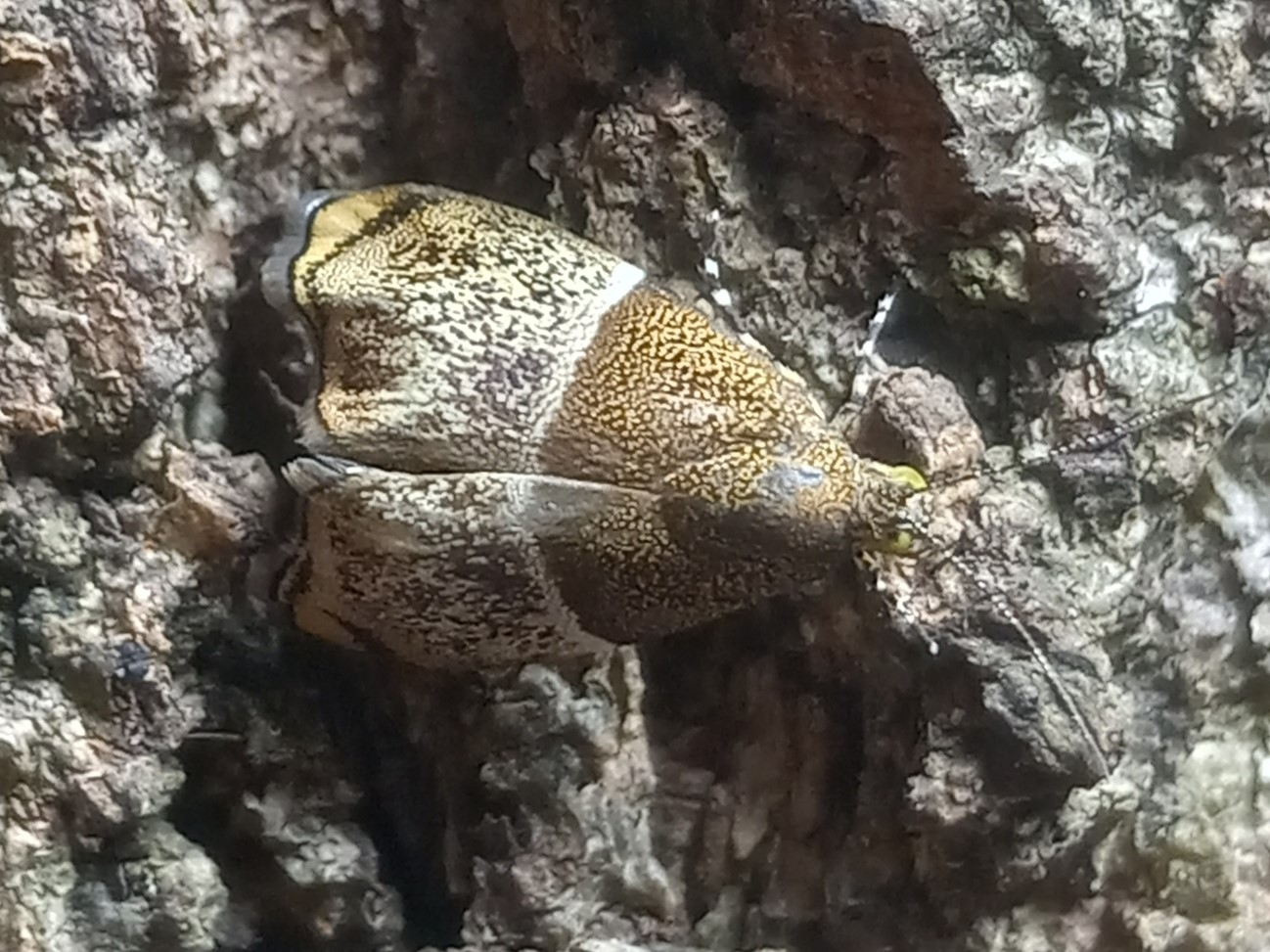

Scientific classification
- Kingdom: Animalia
- Phylum: Arthropoda
- Class: Insecta
- Order: Lepidoptera
- Family: Choreutidae
- Genus: Ornarantia
- Species: O. biferana

Binomial name
- Ornarantia biferana (Walker, 1863)

Synonyms
- Gauris biferana Walker, 1863; Hemerophila biferana; Tortyra biferana

= Ornarantia biferana =

Species of moth

Ornarantia biferana is a species of moth in the family Choreutidae. It was first described by Francis Walker in 1863. It is found in the West Indies and Brazil.
