= Melanoxena =

Scientific classification
- Kingdom: Animalia
- Phylum: Arthropoda
- Class: Insecta
- Order: Lepidoptera
- Family: Choreutidae
- Genus: Melanoxena; Dognin, 1910
- Species: M. falsissima

Binomial name
- Melanoxena falsissima Dognin, 1910

Genus of moths

Melanoxena is a genus of moths in the family Choreutidae, containing only one species, Melanoxena falsissima, which is known from Colombia.
