= Ornarantia rimulalis =

Scientific classification
- Kingdom: Animalia
- Phylum: Arthropoda
- Clade: Pancrustacea
- Class: Insecta
- Order: Lepidoptera
- Family: Choreutidae
- Genus: Ornarantia
- Species: O. rimulalis

Binomial name
- Ornarantia rimulalis (Zeller, 1875)

Synonyms
- Simaethis rimulalis Zeller, 1875; Hemerophila rimulalis; Tortyra rimulalis

Species of moth

Ornarantia rimulalis is a moth in the family Choreutidae. It was described by Zeller in 1875. It is found on the West Indies.
