= Alasea =

Scientific classification
- Domain: Eukaryota
- Kingdom: Animalia
- Phylum: Arthropoda
- Class: Insecta
- Order: Lepidoptera
- Family: Choreutidae
- Genus: Alasea; Rota, 2008
- Species: A. corniculata

Binomial name
- Alasea corniculata Rota, 2008

Genus of moths

Alasea is a genus of moths in the family Choreutidae, containing only one species, Alasea corniculata, which is known from Costa Rica.

The length of the forewings is 4.5–5.2 mm for males and 5.2–5.7 mm for females.

== Etymology ==
The species is named for the horn-shaped projection on the valva. The word is derived from the Latin adjective corniculatus.
