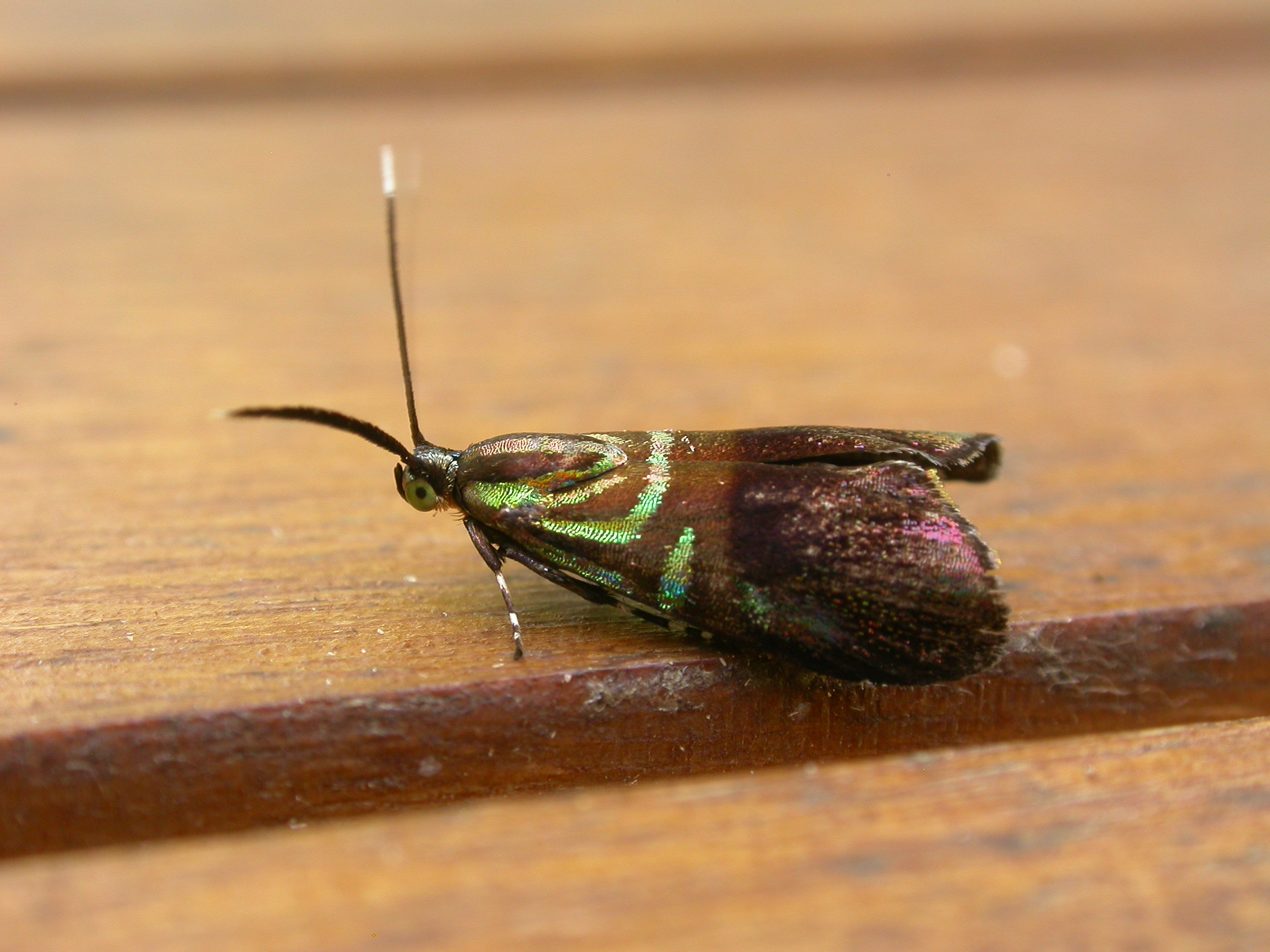
- Saptha exanthista

Scientific classification
- Kingdom: Animalia
- Phylum: Arthropoda
- Class: Insecta
- Order: Lepidoptera
- Family: Choreutidae
- Genus: Saptha; Walker, 1864

Synonyms
- Badera Walker, 1866; Chordates Snellen, 1877

= Saptha =

Genus of moths

Saptha is a genus of moths in the family Choreutidae.

== Species ==
- Saptha aeolodoxa (Meyrick, 1928)
- Saptha angustistriata (Issiki, 1930)
- Saptha beryllitis (Meyrick, 1910)
- Saptha chrysoprasitis (Meyrick, 1936)
- Saptha cypridia (Meyrick, 1910)
- Saptha divitiosa Walker, 1864
- Saptha elegans Walsingham, 1900
- Saptha exanthista (Meyrick, 1910)
- Saptha iridopa (Meyrick, 1907)
- Saptha libanota (Meyrick, 1910)
- Saptha macrospila (Diakonoff, 1968)
- Saptha paradelpha (Meyrick, 1907)
- Saptha prasochalca (Meyrick, 1907)
- Saptha pretiosa (Walker, 1866)
- Saptha pronubana (Snellen, 1877)
- Saptha smaragditis Meyrick, 1905
- Saptha tabularia (Meyrick, 1912)
