= Caloreas =

Scientific classification
- Kingdom: Animalia
- Phylum: Arthropoda
- Clade: Pancrustacea
- Class: Insecta
- Order: Lepidoptera
- Family: Choreutidae
- Subfamily: Choreutinae
- Genus: Caloreas; Heppner, 1977

Genus of moths

Caloreas is a genus of moths in the family Choreutidae.

== Species ==
- Caloreas apocynoglossa (Heppner, 1976)
- Caloreas augustella (Clarke, 1933)
- Caloreas blandinalis (Zeller, 1877)
- Caloreas caliginosa (Braun, 1921)
- Caloreas charmonica (Walsingham, 1914)
- Caloreas coloradella (Dyar, 1900)
- Caloreas cydrota (Meyrick, 1915)
- Caloreas enantia (Walsingham, 1914)
- Caloreas hymenaea (Meyrick, 1909)
- Caloreas lactibasis (Walsingham, 1914)
- Caloreas leucobasis (Dyar, 1900)
- Caloreas loxotenes (Walsingham, 1914)
- Caloreas multimarginata (Braun, 1925)
- Caloreas occidentella (Dyar, 1900)
- Caloreas pelinobasis (Walsingham, 1914)
- Caloreas schausiella (Busck, 1907)
- Caloreas tacubayella (Kearfott, 1908)
- Caloreas venusta (Walsingham, 1914)
