= Ornarantia velatana =

Scientific classification
- Kingdom: Animalia
- Phylum: Arthropoda
- Class: Insecta
- Order: Lepidoptera
- Family: Choreutidae
- Genus: Ornarantia
- Species: O. velatana

Binomial name
- Ornarantia velatana (Walker, 1863)

Synonyms
- Gauris velatana Walker, 1863; Hemerophila velatana

Species of moth

Ornarantia velatana is a moth in the family Choreutidae. It was described by Francis Walker in 1863. It is found in Brazil.
