= Ornarantia tristis =

Scientific classification
- Domain: Eukaryota
- Kingdom: Animalia
- Phylum: Arthropoda
- Class: Insecta
- Order: Lepidoptera
- Family: Choreutidae
- Genus: Ornarantia
- Species: O. tristis

Binomial name
- Ornarantia tristis (C. Felder, R. Felder & Rogenhofer, 1875)

Synonyms
- Gauris tristis Felder & Rogenhofer, 1875; Hemerophila tristis; Tortyra tristis

Species of moth

Ornarantia tristis is a moth in the family Choreutidae. It was described by Cajetan Felder, Rudolf Felder and Alois Friedrich Rogenhofer in 1875. It is found in the Amazon region.
