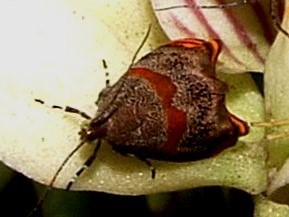

Scientific classification
- Domain: Eukaryota
- Kingdom: Animalia
- Phylum: Arthropoda
- Class: Insecta
- Order: Lepidoptera
- Family: Choreutidae
- Genus: Ornarantia
- Species: O. laciniosella

Binomial name
- Ornarantia laciniosella (Busck, 1914)

Synonyms
- Hemerophila laciniosella Busck, 1914

= Ornarantia laciniosella =

Species of moth

Ornarantia laciniosella is a species of moth in the family Choreutidae. It was described by August Busck in 1914. It is found in Panama.
