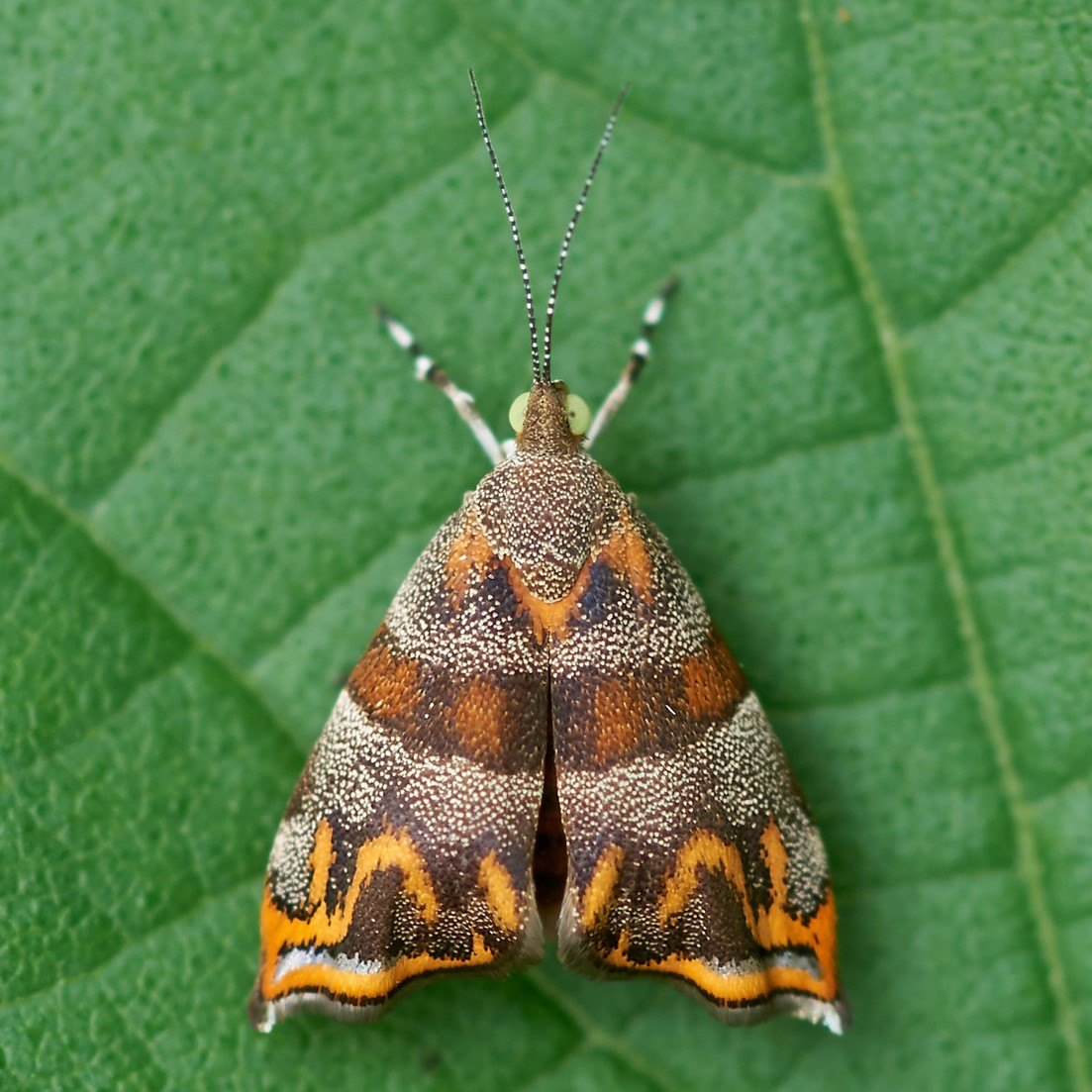

Scientific classification
- Domain: Eukaryota
- Kingdom: Animalia
- Phylum: Arthropoda
- Class: Insecta
- Order: Lepidoptera
- Family: Choreutidae
- Genus: Ornarantia
- Species: O. xutholopa

Binomial name
- Ornarantia xutholopa (Walsingham, 1914)

Synonyms
- Hemerophila xutholopa Walsingham, 1914

= Ornarantia xutholopa =

Species of moth

Ornarantia xutholopa is a species of moth in the family Choreutidae. It was first described by Walsingham in 1914. It is found in Mexico.
