= Trichocirca =

Scientific classification
- Kingdom: Animalia
- Phylum: Arthropoda
- Class: Insecta
- Order: Lepidoptera
- Family: Choreutidae
- Genus: Trichocirca; Meyrick, 1920
- Species: T. tyrota

Binomial name
- Trichocirca tyrota Meyrick, 1920

Genus of moths

Trichocirca is a monotypic moth genus in the family Choreutidae described by Edward Meyrick in 1920. Its only species, Trichocirca tyrota, described in the same publication, is known from Kenya, Kilimanjaro and Bismarckhügel.

It is described as having a wingspan of 17-20 mm that excludes it actually from Choreutidae, as these species are smaller. Meyrick included it to Yponomeutinae

== Taxonomy ==
Trichocirca was included in the Yponomeutidae by Thomas Bainbrigge Fletcher in 1929. It was transferred to the Choreutidae on the advice of the late Jorma Kyrki of Finland.
