= Telosphrantis =

Scientific classification
- Kingdom: Animalia
- Phylum: Arthropoda
- Class: Insecta
- Order: Lepidoptera
- Family: Choreutidae
- Genus: Telosphrantis; Meyrick, 1932
- Species: T. aethiopica

Binomial name
- Telosphrantis aethiopica Meyrick, 1932

Genus of moths

Telosphrantis is a genus of moths in the family Choreutidae, containing only one species, Telosphrantis aethiopica, which is known from Ethiopia (Mount Chilallo, alt.2743 m)

The length of the forewings is about 7 mm.
