= Ornarantia chorica =

Scientific classification
- Kingdom: Animalia
- Phylum: Arthropoda
- Class: Insecta
- Order: Lepidoptera
- Family: Choreutidae
- Genus: Ornarantia
- Species: O. chorica

Binomial name
- Ornarantia chorica (Meyrick, 1926)

Synonyms
- Tortyra chorica Meyrick, 1926; Hemerophila chorica

Species of moth

Ornarantia chorica is a moth in the family Choreutidae. It was described by Edward Meyrick in 1926. It is found in Colombia.
