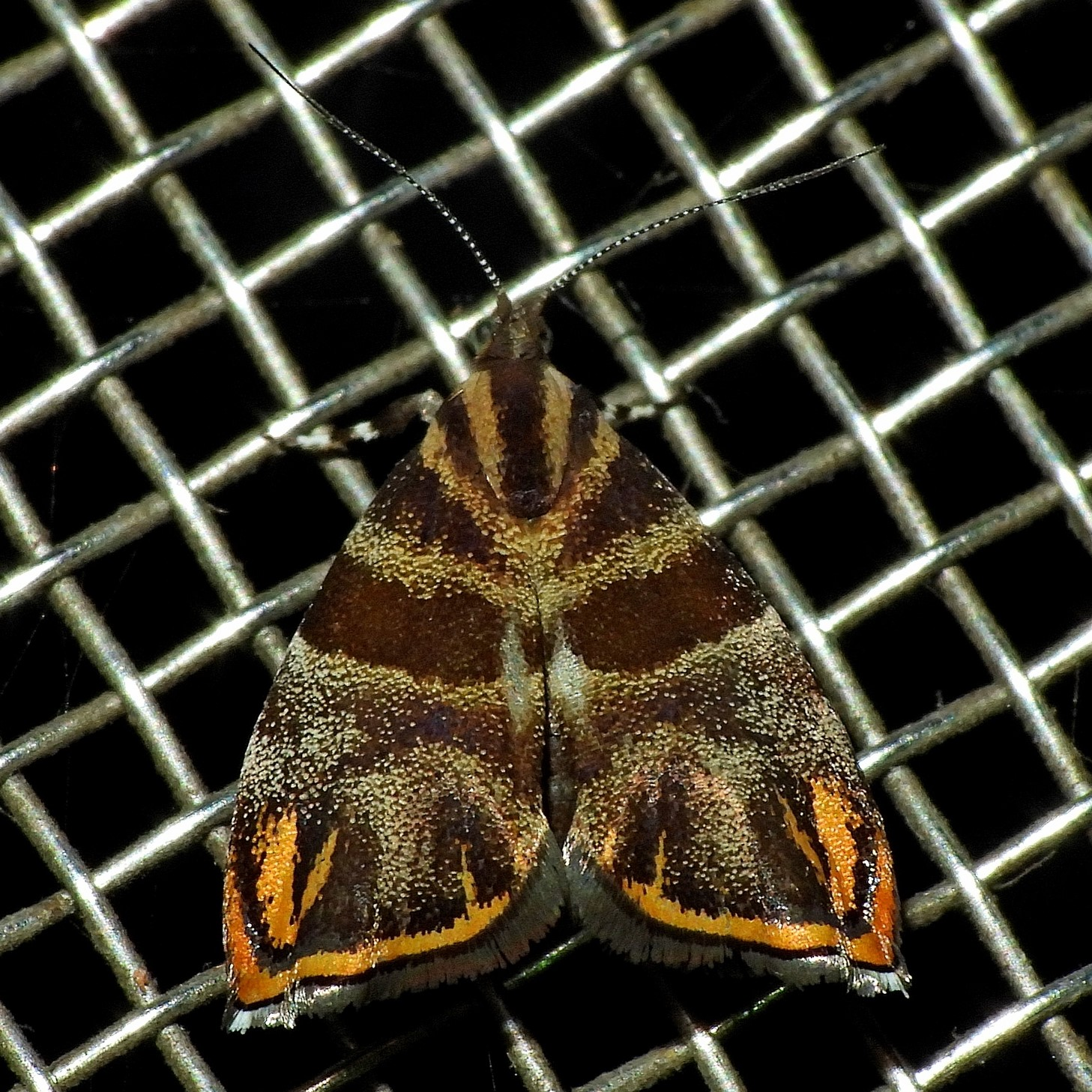

Scientific classification
- Kingdom: Animalia
- Phylum: Arthropoda
- Clade: Pancrustacea
- Class: Insecta
- Order: Lepidoptera
- Family: Choreutidae
- Genus: Ornarantia
- Species: O. cinctipes

Binomial name
- Ornarantia cinctipes (C. Felder, R. Felder & Rogenhofer, 1875)

Synonyms
- Gauris cinctipes Felder & Rogenhofer, 1875; Hemerophila cinctipes; Anthophila cinctipes; Hemerophila isthmia Walsingham, 1914

= Ornarantia cinctipes =

Species of moth

Ornarantia cinctipes is a species of moth in the family Choreutidae. It was first described by Cajetan Felder, Rudolf Felder and Alois Friedrich Rogenhofer in 1875. It is found in Brazil and Central America.
