= Ornarantia scenophora =

Scientific classification
- Domain: Eukaryota
- Kingdom: Animalia
- Phylum: Arthropoda
- Class: Insecta
- Order: Lepidoptera
- Family: Choreutidae
- Genus: Ornarantia
- Species: O. scenophora

Binomial name
- Ornarantia scenophora (Meyrick, 1922)

Synonyms
- Simaethis scenophora Meyrick, 1922; Hemerophila scenophora

Species of moth

Ornarantia scenophora is a species of moth in the family Choreutidae. It was first described by Edward Meyrick in 1922. It is found in Peru.
