= Ornarantia ophiodesma =

Scientific classification
- Kingdom: Animalia
- Phylum: Arthropoda
- Class: Insecta
- Order: Lepidoptera
- Family: Choreutidae
- Genus: Ornarantia
- Species: O. ophiodesma

Binomial name
- Ornarantia ophiodesma (Meyrick, 1915)

Synonyms
- Simaethis ophiodesma Meyrick, 1915; Hemerophila ophiodesma

Species of moth

Ornarantia ophiodesma is a moth in the family Choreutidae. It was described by Edward Meyrick in 1915. It is found in Peru.
