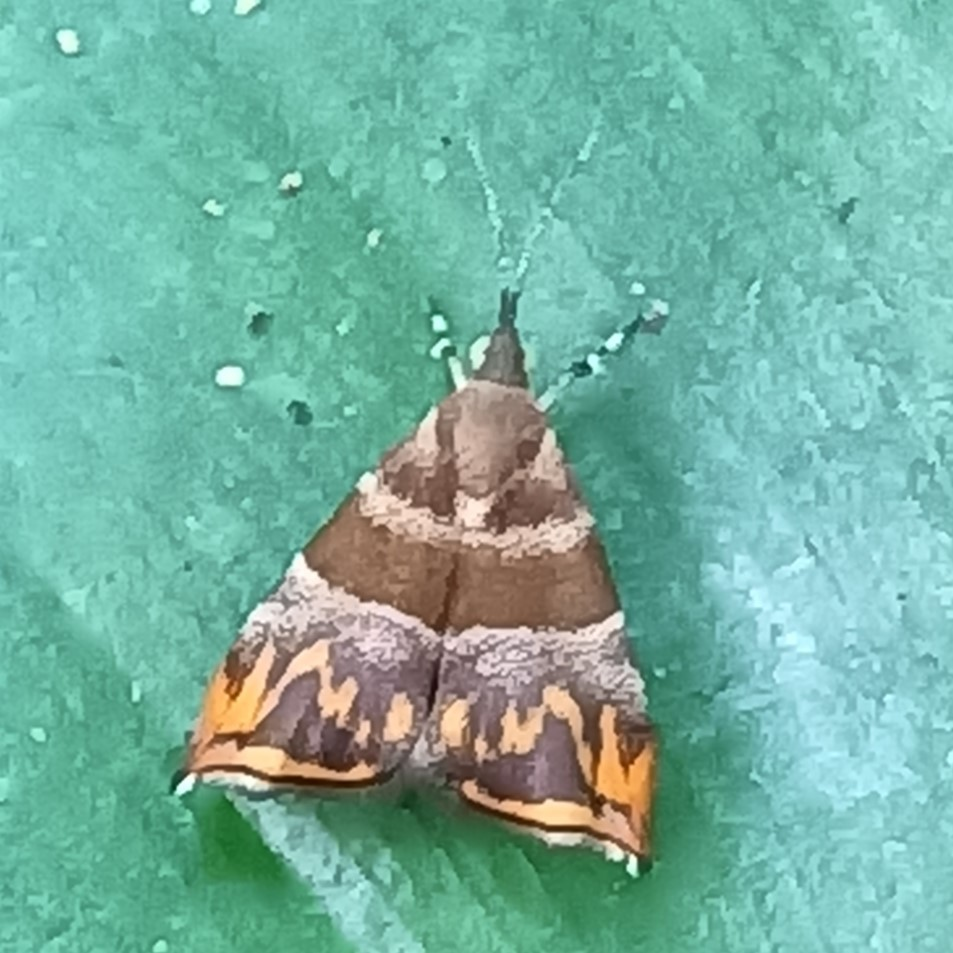
- Ornarantia contrariana

Scientific classification
- Kingdom: Animalia
- Phylum: Arthropoda
- Class: Insecta
- Order: Lepidoptera
- Family: Choreutidae
- Subfamily: Choreutinae
- Genus: Ornarantia; Rota, 2012

Type species
- Hemerophila laciniosella Busck, 1914.

= Ornarantia =

Genus of moths

Ornarantia is a genus of moths in the family Choreutidae.

== Species ==
- Ornarantia biferana (Walker, 1863)
- Ornarantia bigerana (Walker, 1863)
- Ornarantia canofusana (Walker, 1863)
- Ornarantia chorica (Meyrick, 1926)
- Ornarantia cinctipes (Felder & Rogenhofer, 1875)
- Ornarantia contrariana (Walker, 1863)
- Ornarantia contubernalis (Zeller, 1877)
- Ornarantia dyari Busck, 1900
- Ornarantia gradella Walsingham, 1914
- Ornarantia immarginata Walsingham, 1914
- Ornarantia laciniosella Busck, 1914
- Ornarantia meratella Busck, 1914
- Ornarantia ophiodesma (Meyrick, 1915)
- Ornarantia rimulalis (Zeller, 1875)
- Ornarantia scenophora (Meyrick, 1922)
- Ornarantia tristis (Felder & Rogenhofer, 1875)
- Ornarantia velatana (Walker, 1863)
- Ornarantia xutholopa Walsingham, 1914
