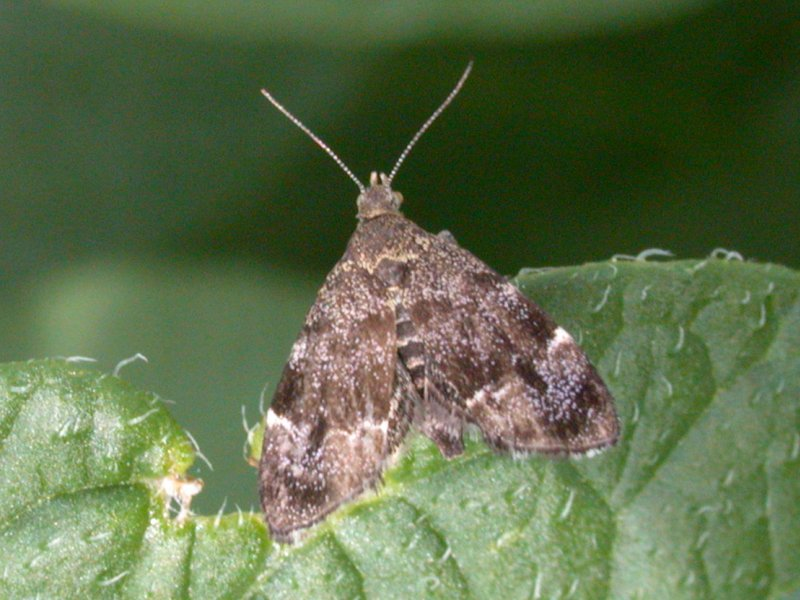
- Nettle-tap moth

Scientific classification
- Kingdom: Animalia
- Phylum: Arthropoda
- Clade: Pancrustacea
- Class: Insecta
- Order: Lepidoptera
- Infraorder: Heteroneura
- Clade: Eulepidoptera
- Clade: Ditrysia
- Clade: Apoditrysia
- Superfamily: Choreutoidea; Stainton, 1858
- Family: Choreutidae; Stainton, 1858

Subfamilies and genera
- Brenthiinae: Brenthia Clemens, 1860; =Microaethia Chambers, 1878; Litobrenthia Diakonoff, 1978; Choreutinae: Alasea Rota, 2008; Anthophila Haworth, [1811]; Asterivora Dugdale, 1979; Caloreas Heppner, 1977; Choreutis Hübner [1825]; =Choreutidia Sauber, 1902; =Hemerophila Fernald, 1900; =Allononyma Busck, 1904; =Macropia Costa, 1836; Hemerophila Hübner, [1817]; ?Melanoxena Dognin, 1910; Neocaloreas Heppner, 2022; Neochoreutis Heppner, 2020; Niveas Rota, 2013; Ornarantia Rota in Rota & Wahlberg, 2012; Peotyle Diakonoff, 1978; Prochoreutis Diakonoff & Heppner, 1980; Protochoreutis Heppner, 2019; Pseudocaloreas Heppner, 2021; Pseudotebenna Heppner, 2023; Rhobonda Walker, 1863; Saptha Walker, 1864; =Badera Walker, 1866; =Chordates Snellen, 1877; Tebenna Billberg, 1820; =Porpe Hübner, 1825; Telosphrantis Meyrick, 1932; Tortyra Walker, 1863; =Choregia Zeller, 1877; =Walsinghamia Riley, 1889; Trichocirca Meyrick, 1920; Zodia Heppner, 1979

Diversity
- 402 species

= Choreutidae =

Family of moths

Choreutidae, or metalmark moths, are a family of insects in the lepidopteran order whose relationships have been long disputed. It was placed previously in the superfamily Yponomeutoidea in family Glyphipterigidae and in superfamily Sesioidea. It is now considered to represent its own superfamily (Minet, 1986). The relationship of the family to the other lineages in the group "Apoditrysia" need a new assessment, especially with new molecular data.

== Distribution ==
The moths occur worldwide, with 19 genera in three subfamilies defined by the structural characteristics of the immature stages (larvae and pupae), rather than the characters of the adults (Heppner and Duckworth, 1981; Rota, 2005).

== Behaviour ==
These small moths often bear metallic scales and are mostly day-flying (some also come to lights), with a jerky, pivoting behaviour, and may fluff up their wings at an extreme angle. Some tropical exemplars such as the genus Saptha are quite spectacular, with bright green metallic bands. The members of the genus Brenthia, usually placed in their own subfamily Brenthiinae, have eyespots on the wings and have been shown to mimic jumping spiders (Rota and Wagner, 2006).

== Larval hostplants ==
Most species skeletonize leaves often among silken webbing. The foodplants of many Choreutinae occurring in the temperate region and some tropical species are known being dominated by Asteraceae, Betulaceae, Boraginaceae, Dipterocarpaceae, Fabaceae, Labiatae, Moraceae (mainly Ficus), Rosaceae, Sapindaceae and Urticaceae. The European nettle-tap moth (Anthophila fabriciana Linnaeus, 1767), (Note: illustrated here)is a familiar sight pirouetting around "stinging nettles" Urtica and nearby flowers while Choreutis pariana skeletonizes apple leaves. The last genus has 85 species worldwide one of which, C. tigroides, is a pest of "jackfruit" (Artocarpus) (Dugdale et al., 1999).

== Sources ==
- O'Toole, Christopher, ed. (2002). Firefly Encyclopedia of Insects and Spiders. ISBN 1-55297-612-2.
- Dugdale, J.S., Kristensen, N.P., Robinson, G.S. and Scoble, M.J. (1999) [1998]. The smaller microlepidoptera grade superfamilies, Ch.13., pp. 217–232 in Kristensen, N.P. (Ed.). Lepidoptera, Moths and Butterflies. Volume 1: Evolution, Systematics, and Biogeography. Handbuch der Zoologie. Eine Naturgeschichte der Stämme des Tierreiches / Handbook of Zoology. A Natural History of the phyla of the Animal Kingdom. Band / Volume IV Arthropoda: Insecta Teilband / Part 35: 491 pp. Walter de Gruyter, Berlin, New York.
- Heppner, J. B.; Duckworth, W. D. (1981). "Classification of the superfamily Sesioidea (Lepidoptera: Ditrysia)". Smithsonian Contributions to Zoology. 314 (314): 1–144. doi:10.5479/si.00810282.314.
- Minet, J. (1986). "Ébauche d'une classification moderne de l'ordre des Lépidoptères". Alexanor (in French). 14 (7): 291–313.
- Rota, J. (2005). "Larval and Pupal Descriptions of the Neotropical Choreutid Genera Rhobonda Walker and Zodia Heppner (Lepidoptera: Choreutidae)". Annals of the Entomological Society of America. 98 (1) (published 1 January 2005): 37–47. doi:10.1603/0013-8746(2005)098[0037:LAPDOT]2.0.CO;2. S2CID 86311824.
- Rota, J.; Wagner, D.L. (2006). "Predator Mimicry: Metalmark Moths Mimic Their Jumping Spider Predators". PLOS ONE. 1 (1) (published 20 December 2006): e45. Bibcode:2006PLoSO...1...45R. doi:10.1371/journal.pone.0000045. PMC 1762363. PMID 17183674.
