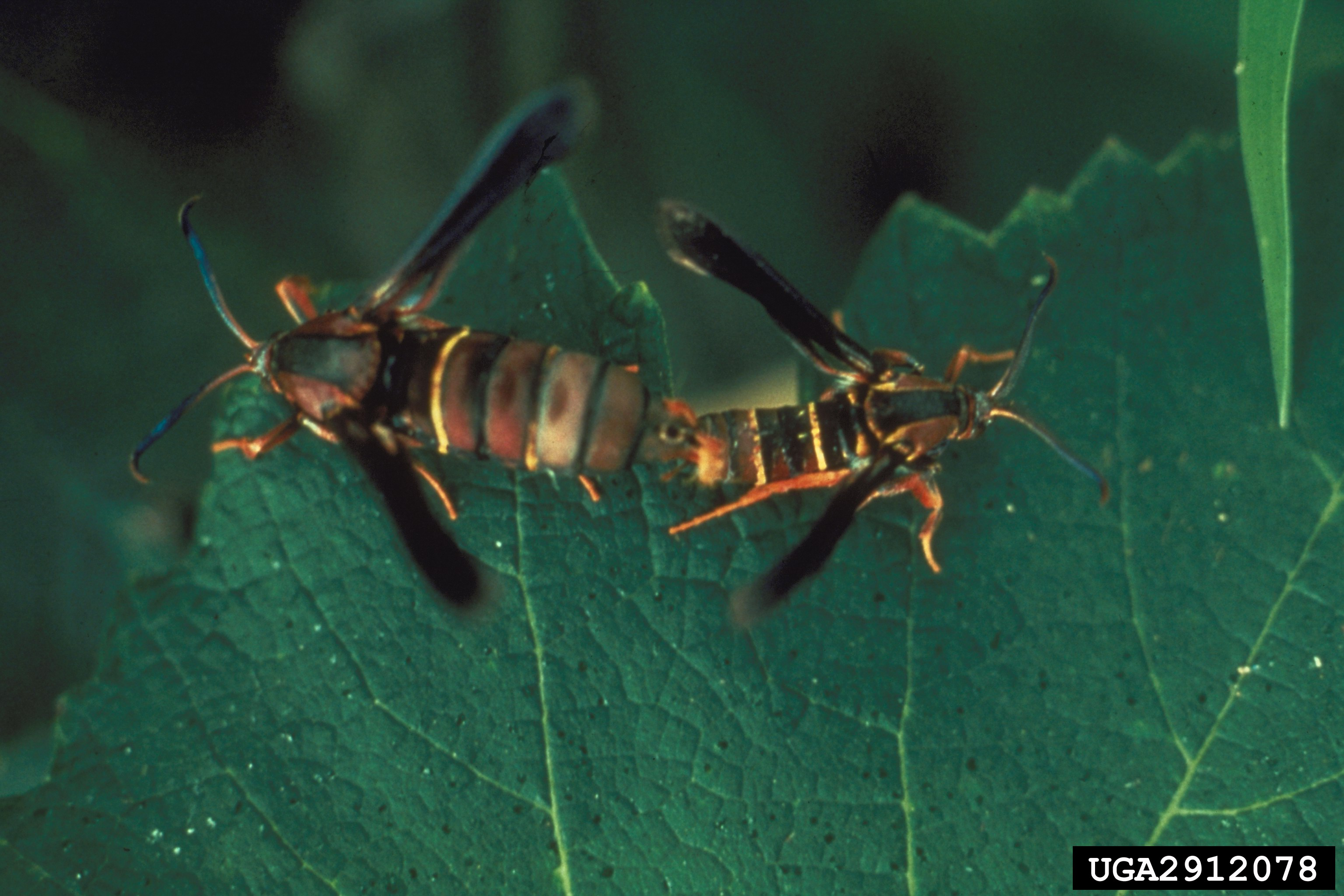
- Vitacea polistiformis

Scientific classification
- Kingdom: Animalia
- Phylum: Arthropoda
- Class: Insecta
- Order: Lepidoptera
- Family: Sesiidae
- Tribe: Paranthrenini
- Genus: Vitacea; Engelhardt, 1946

Species
- See text

= Vitacea =

Genus of moths

Vitacea is a genus of moths in the family Sesiidae.

== Species ==
- Vitacea cupressi (Edwards, 1881)
- Vitacea polistiformis (Harris, 1854)
- Vitacea scepsiformis (Edwards, 1881)
- Vitacea admiranda (Edwards, 1882)
