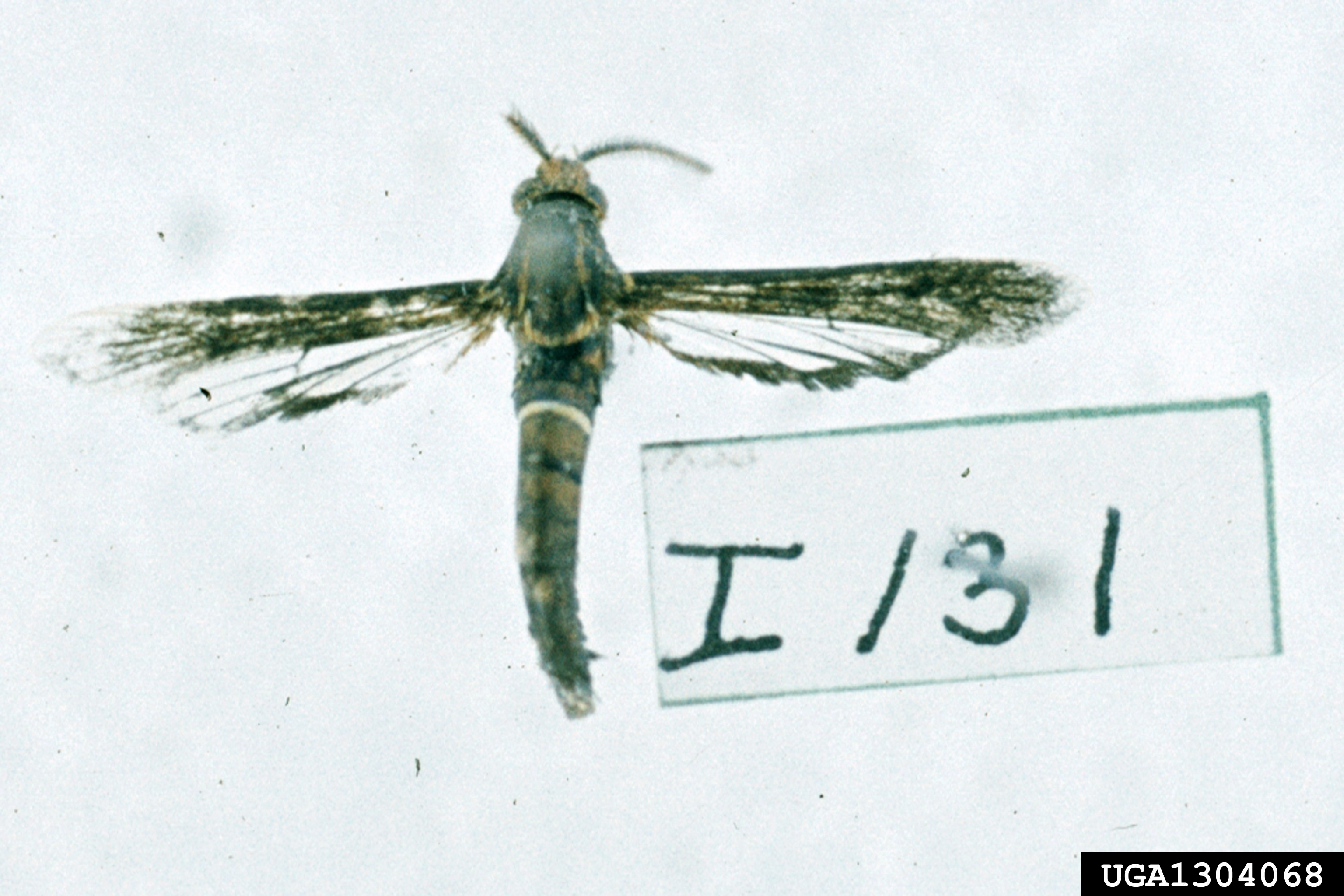

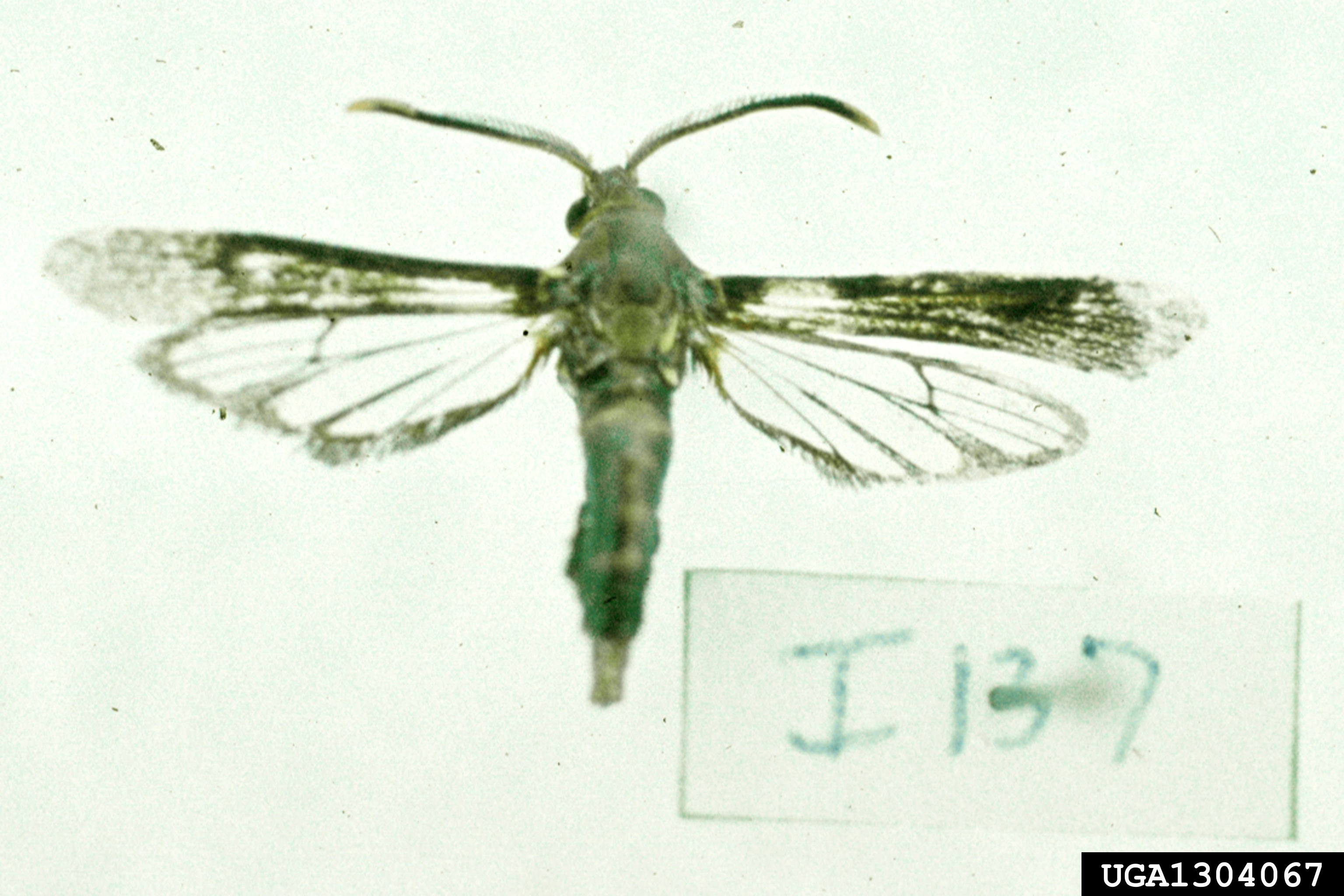

Scientific classification
- Domain: Eukaryota
- Kingdom: Animalia
- Phylum: Arthropoda
- Class: Insecta
- Order: Lepidoptera
- Family: Sesiidae
- Genus: Vitacea
- Species: V. scepsiformis

Binomial name
- Vitacea scepsiformis (Edwards, 1881)

Synonyms
- Sciapteron scepsiformis Edwards, 1881

= Vitacea scepsiformis =

Species of moth

Vitacea scepsiformis, the lesser grape root borer moth, is a moth of the family Sesiidae. It is found in North America, from New York south to Florida and west to Texas, Kansas and Missouri.

The wingspan is about 23 mm. Adults are on wing from July to October.

The larvae feed in the roots of Vitis species.

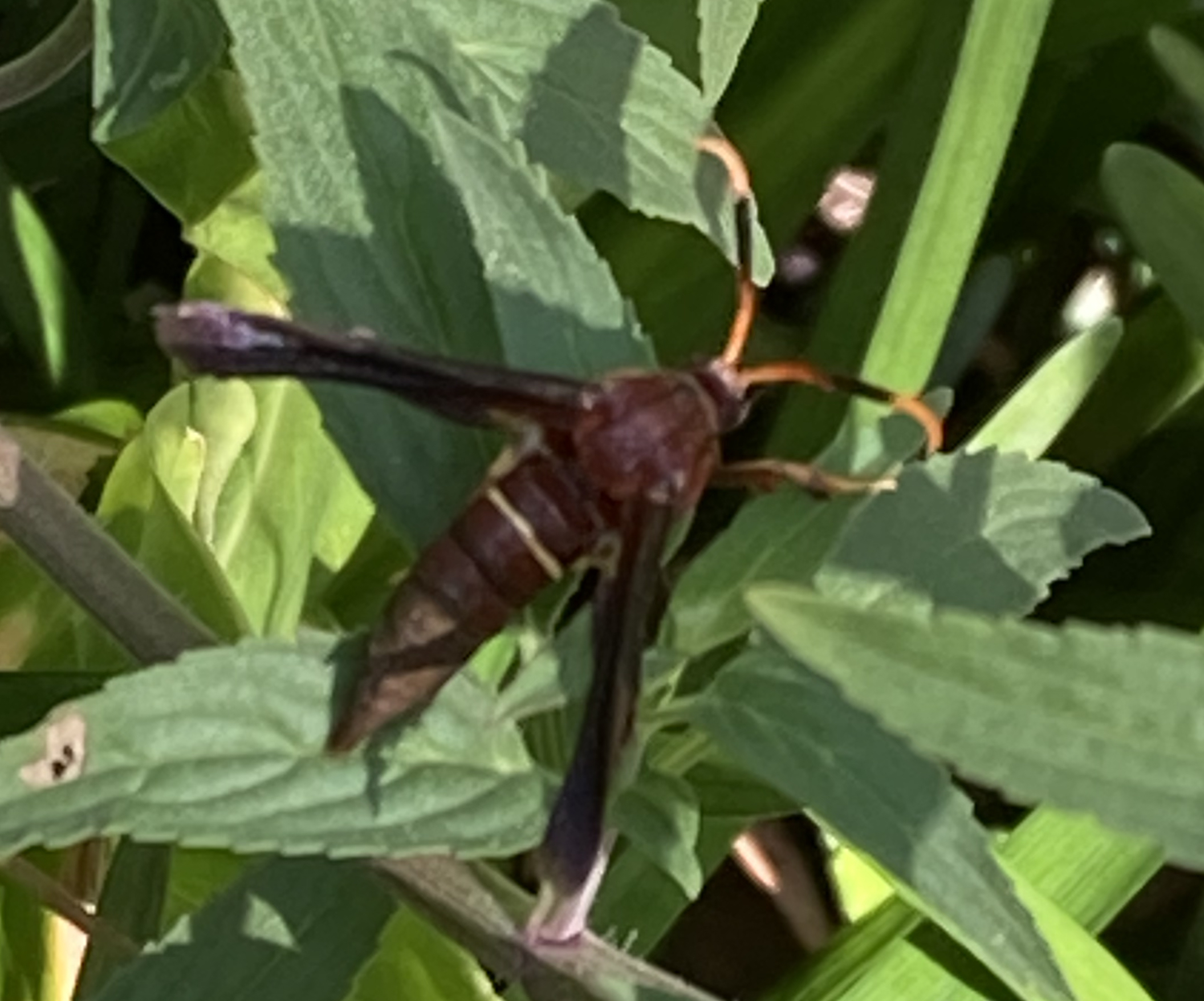
Vitacea scepsiformis (lesser grape root borer moth), seen in Gainesville, FL, on Monarda punctata (spotted beebalm).
