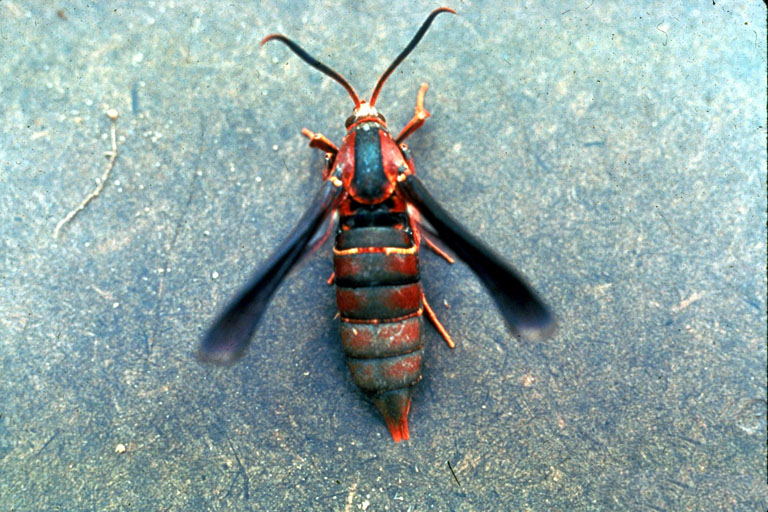

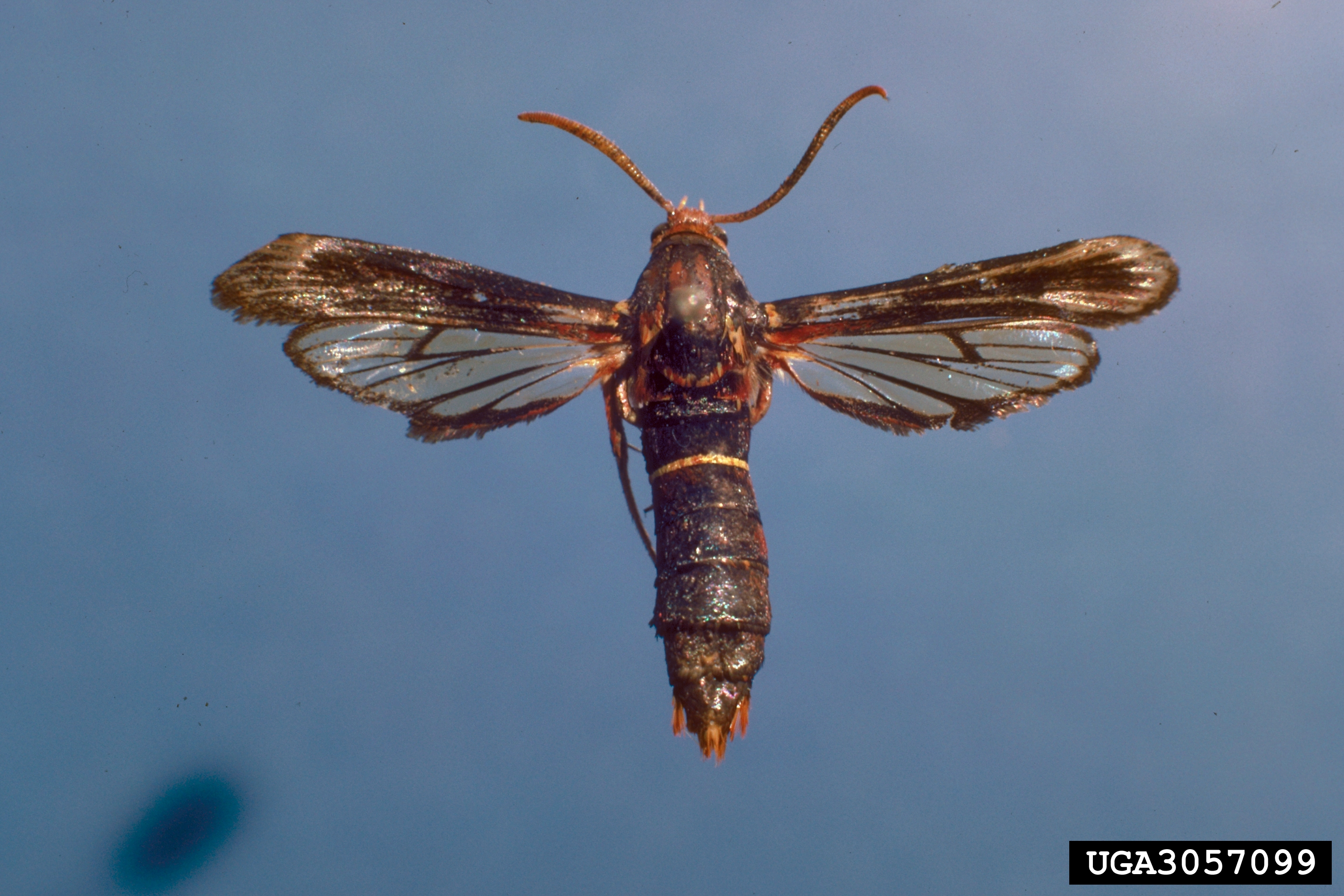

Scientific classification
- Kingdom: Animalia
- Phylum: Arthropoda
- Class: Insecta
- Order: Lepidoptera
- Family: Sesiidae
- Genus: Vitacea
- Species: V. polistiformis

Binomial name
- Vitacea polistiformis (Harris, 1854)

Synonyms
- Aegeria polistiformis Harris, 1854; Trichilium polistiformis Fitch, 1856; Sciapteron seminole Neumoegen, 1894; Vitacea polistiformis f. huron Engelhardt, 1946

= Vitacea polistiformis =

Species of moth

Vitacea polistiformis, the grape root borer, is a moth of the family Sesiidae. It is found throughout the midwest of the United States, south to Florida and Texas. It can reduce productivity as much as 47%. Scientists are exploring the possibility of using soil acoustics to locate and combat infestations of pests. Adults are Batesian mimics of Polistes paper wasps.

== Gallery ==
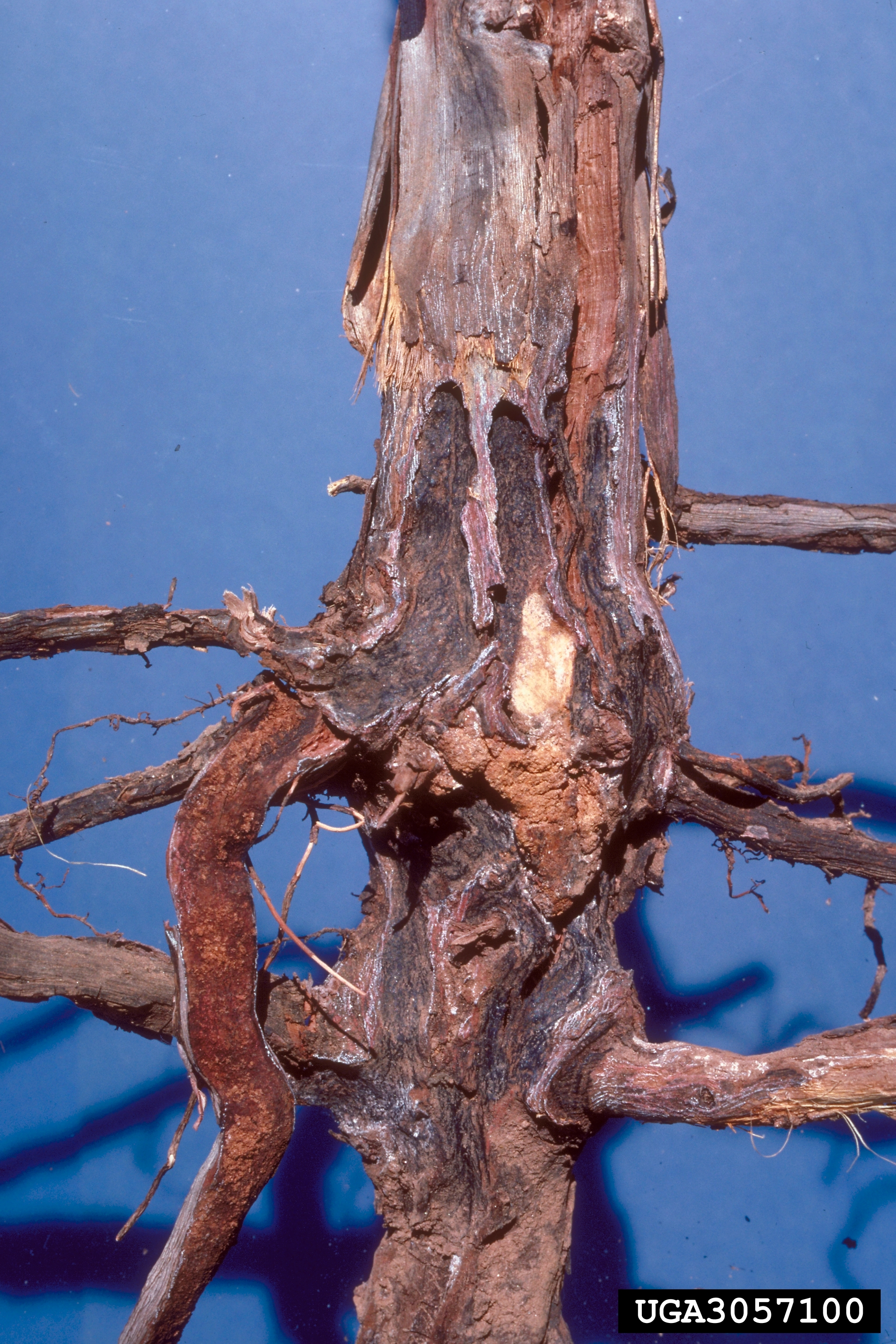
Larva

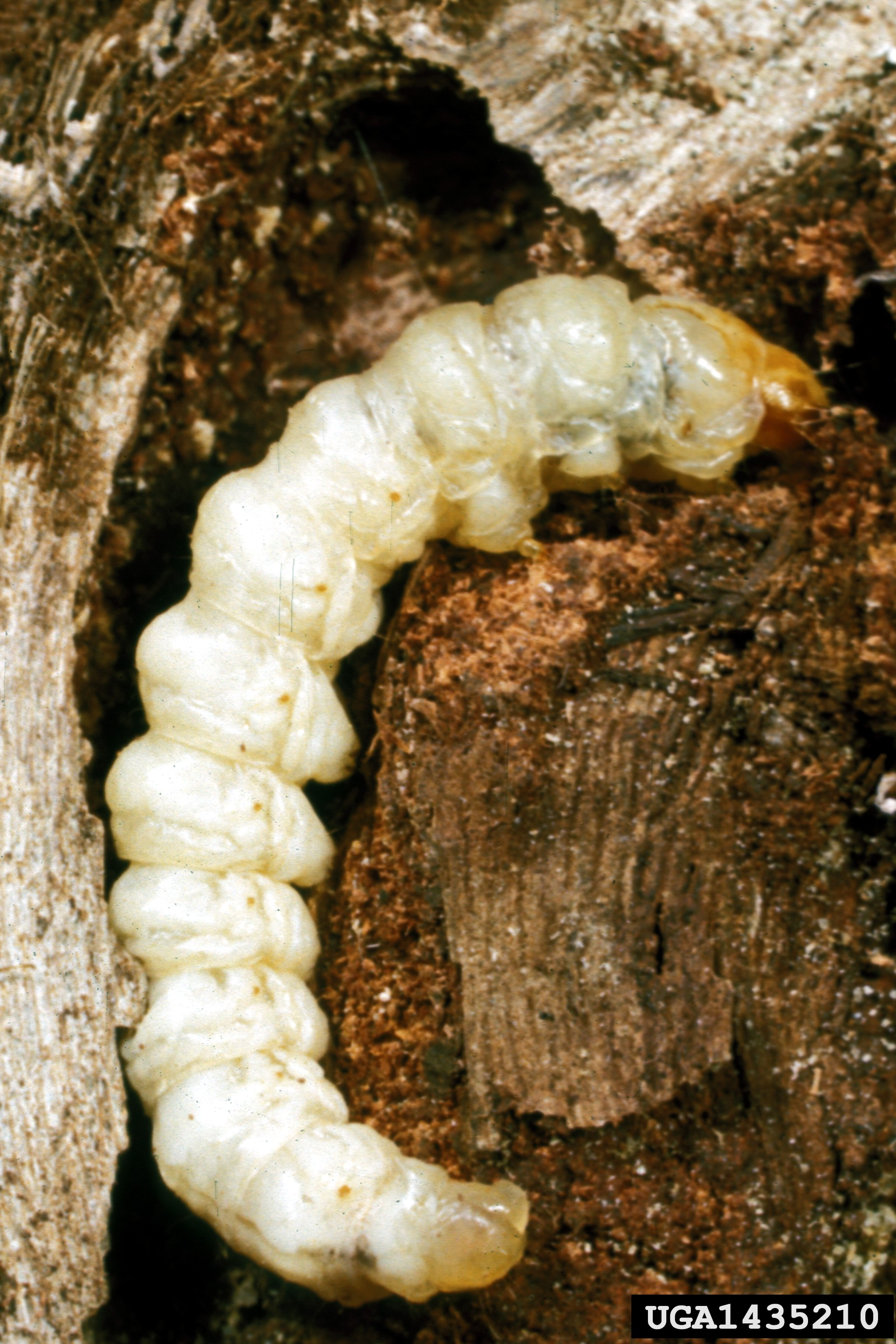
Larva

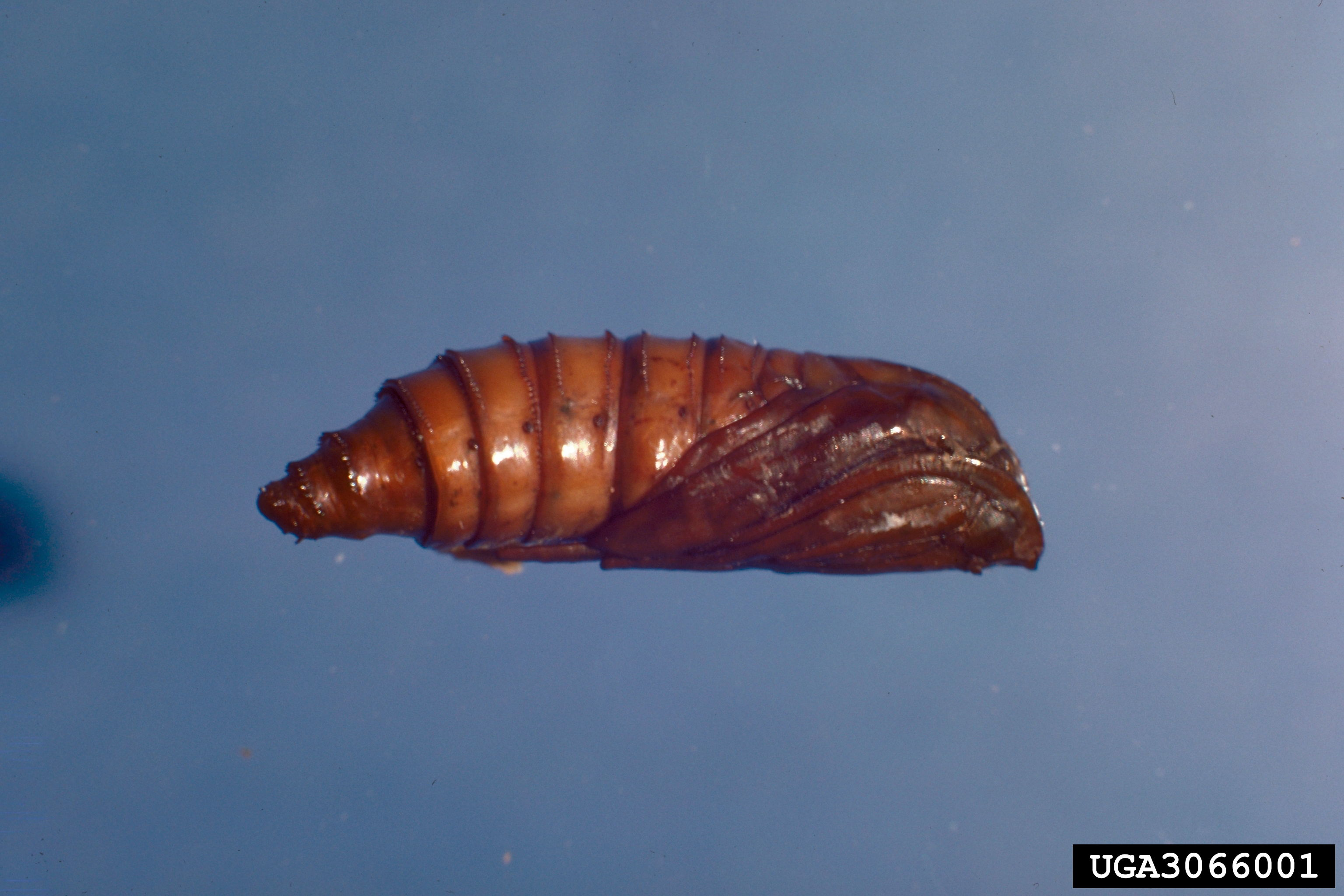
Pupa

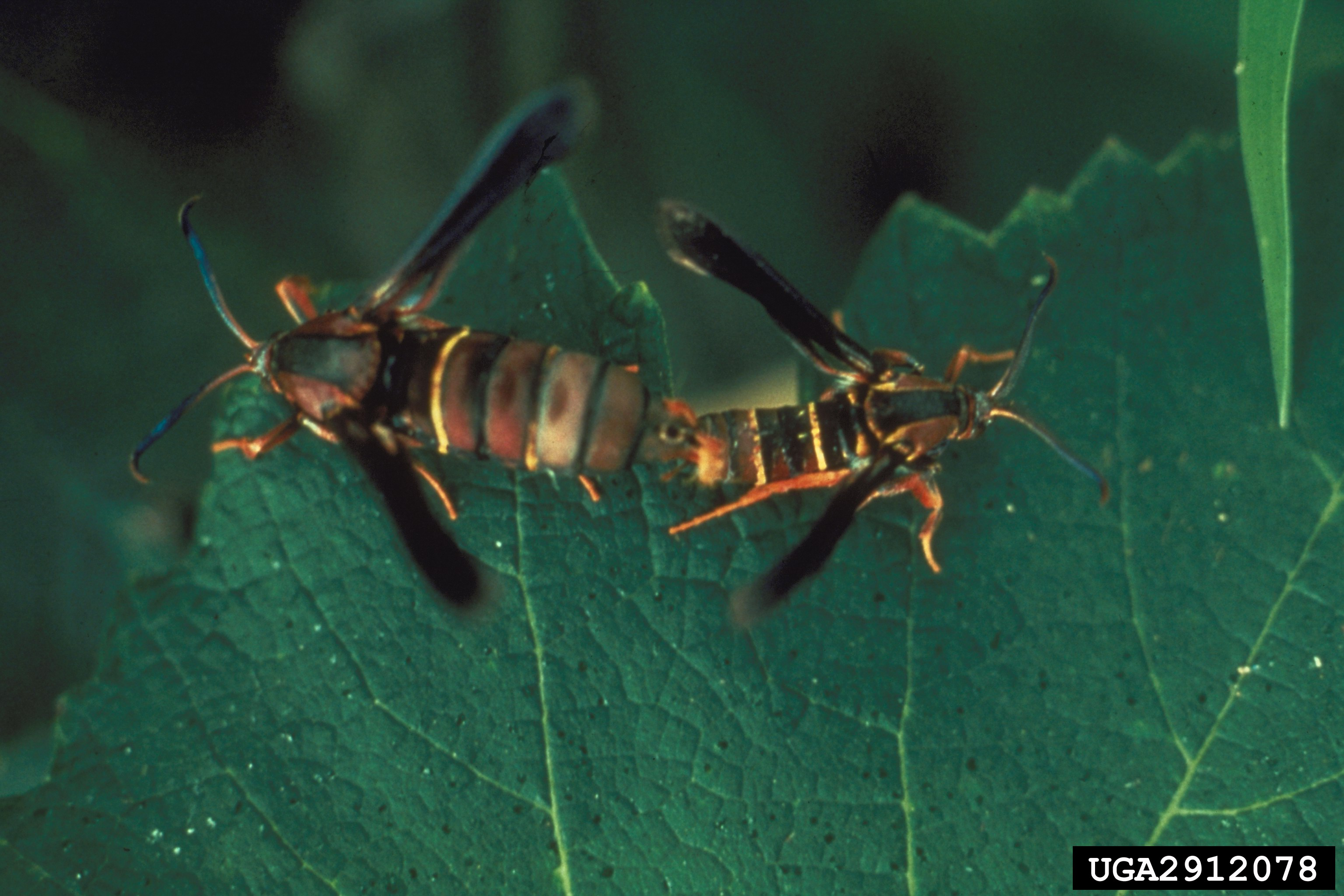
Mating
