= Puseyia =

Scientific classification
- Kingdom: Animalia
- Phylum: Arthropoda
- Class: Insecta
- Order: Lepidoptera
- Family: Cossidae
- Subfamily: Hypoptinae
- Genus: Puseyia; Dyar, 1937

Moth genus in family Cossidae

Puseyia is a genus of moths in the family Cossidae.

== Species ==
- Puseyia puseyiae Dyar, 1937
- Puseyia hiscelis Dyar, 1937
- Puseyia ban Dyar, 1937
