= Puseyia hiscelis =

Scientific classification
- Kingdom: Animalia
- Phylum: Arthropoda
- Class: Insecta
- Order: Lepidoptera
- Family: Cossidae
- Genus: Puseyia
- Species: P. hiscelis

Binomial name
- Puseyia hiscelis Dyar, 1937

Species of moth

Puseyia hiscelis is a moth in the family Cossidae. It is found in the Amazon region.
