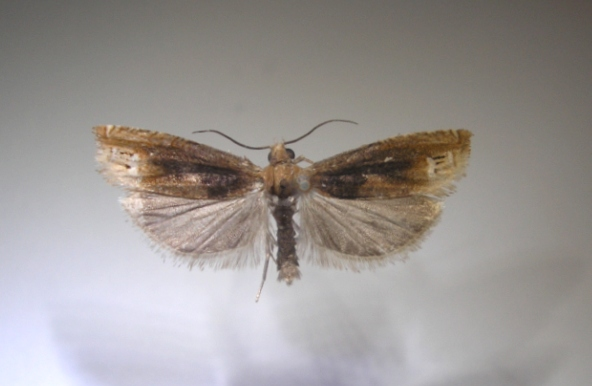

Scientific classification
- Kingdom: Animalia
- Phylum: Arthropoda
- Clade: Pancrustacea
- Class: Insecta
- Order: Lepidoptera
- Family: Tortricidae
- Genus: Eucosma
- Species: E. flavispecula

Binomial name
- Eucosma flavispecula Kuznetsov, 1964

= Eucosma flavispecula =

Species of moth

Eucosma flavispecula is a moth of the family Tortricidae. It is found in China (Tianjin, Hebei, Shanxi, Inner Mongolia, Heilongjiang, Zhejiang, Shaanxi, Ningxia), Mongolia, Russia, Kazakhstan and Europe, where it is found in Finland, from Germany to Italy and in Hungary, Romania and Ukraine.

The wingspan is 14–18 mm. Adults are on wing from the end of June to August.

The larvae feed on Centaurea jacea.
