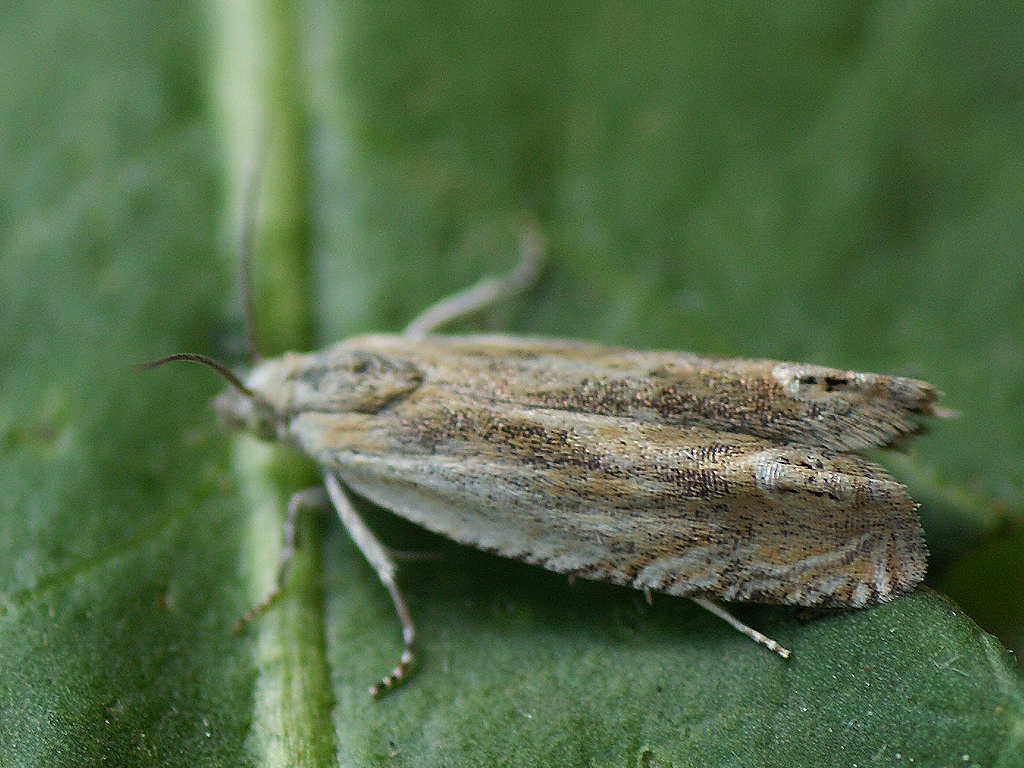

Scientific classification
- Kingdom: Animalia
- Phylum: Arthropoda
- Clade: Pancrustacea
- Class: Insecta
- Order: Lepidoptera
- Family: Tortricidae
- Genus: Eucosma
- Species: E. wimmerana

Binomial name
- Eucosma wimmerana (Treitschke, 1835)

Synonyms
- Grapholitha wimmerana Treitschke, 1835; Semasia gracilis Filipjev, 1924; Grapholitha incana Lienig & Zeller, 1846; Grapholitha maritimana Walker, 1863; Grapholitha wimmeriana Lederer, 1859

= Eucosma wimmerana =

Species of moth

Eucosma wimmerana is a species of moth of the family Tortricidae. It is found in China (Tianjin, Hebei, Henan, Shaanxi, Gansu, Xinjiang), Mongolia, Japan, Russia, Kazakhstan and Europe, where it has been recorded from Sicily, France, the Netherlands, Germany, Austria, Switzerland, Italy, the Czech Republic, Slovakia, Poland, the Baltic region, Slovenia and Romania.

The wingspan is 14–17 mm. Adults are on wing from June to July.

The larvae feed on Artemisia campestris and Artemisia dracunculus. Larval feeding results in gall formation. Larvae can be found from September to May.
