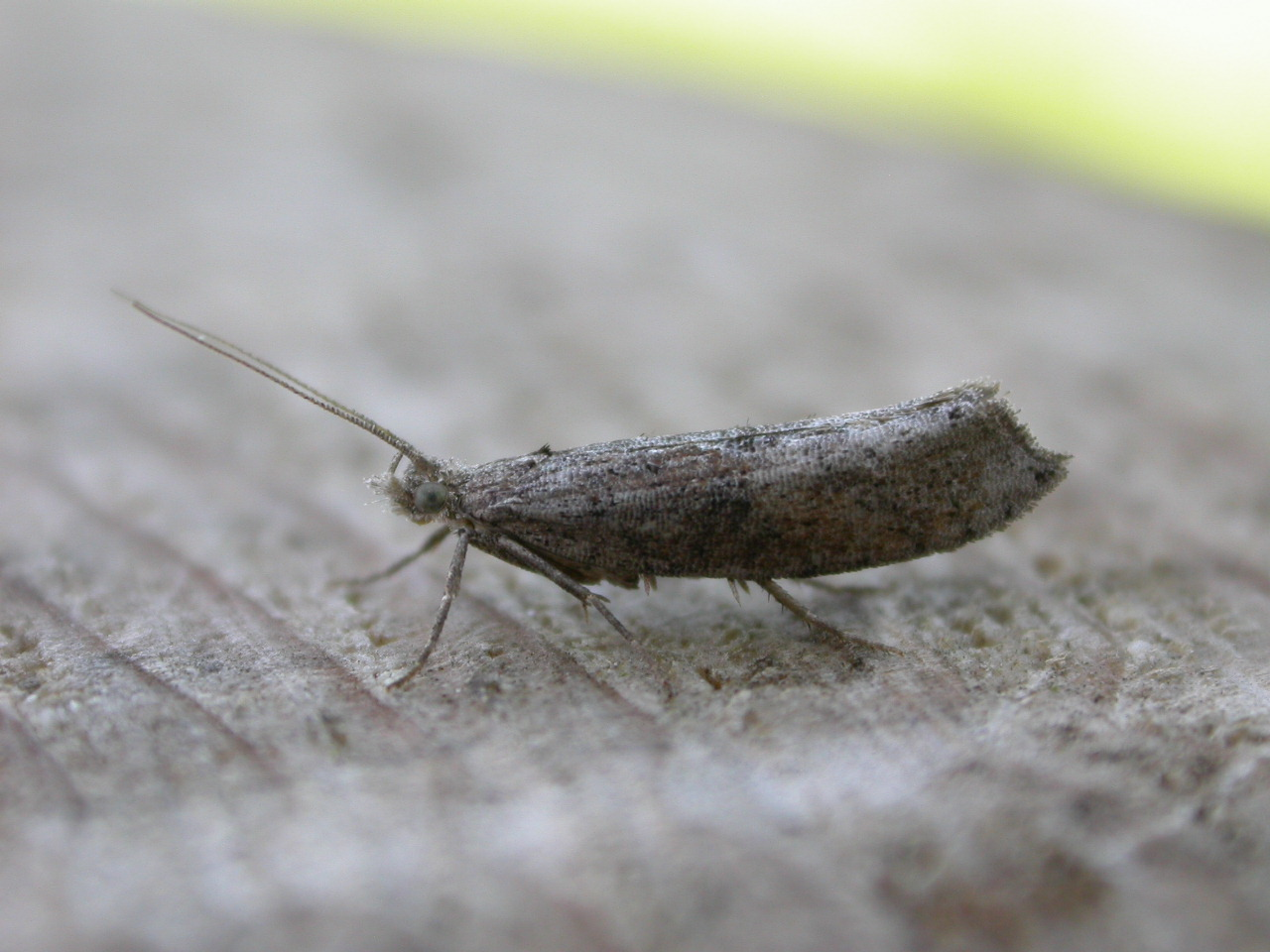

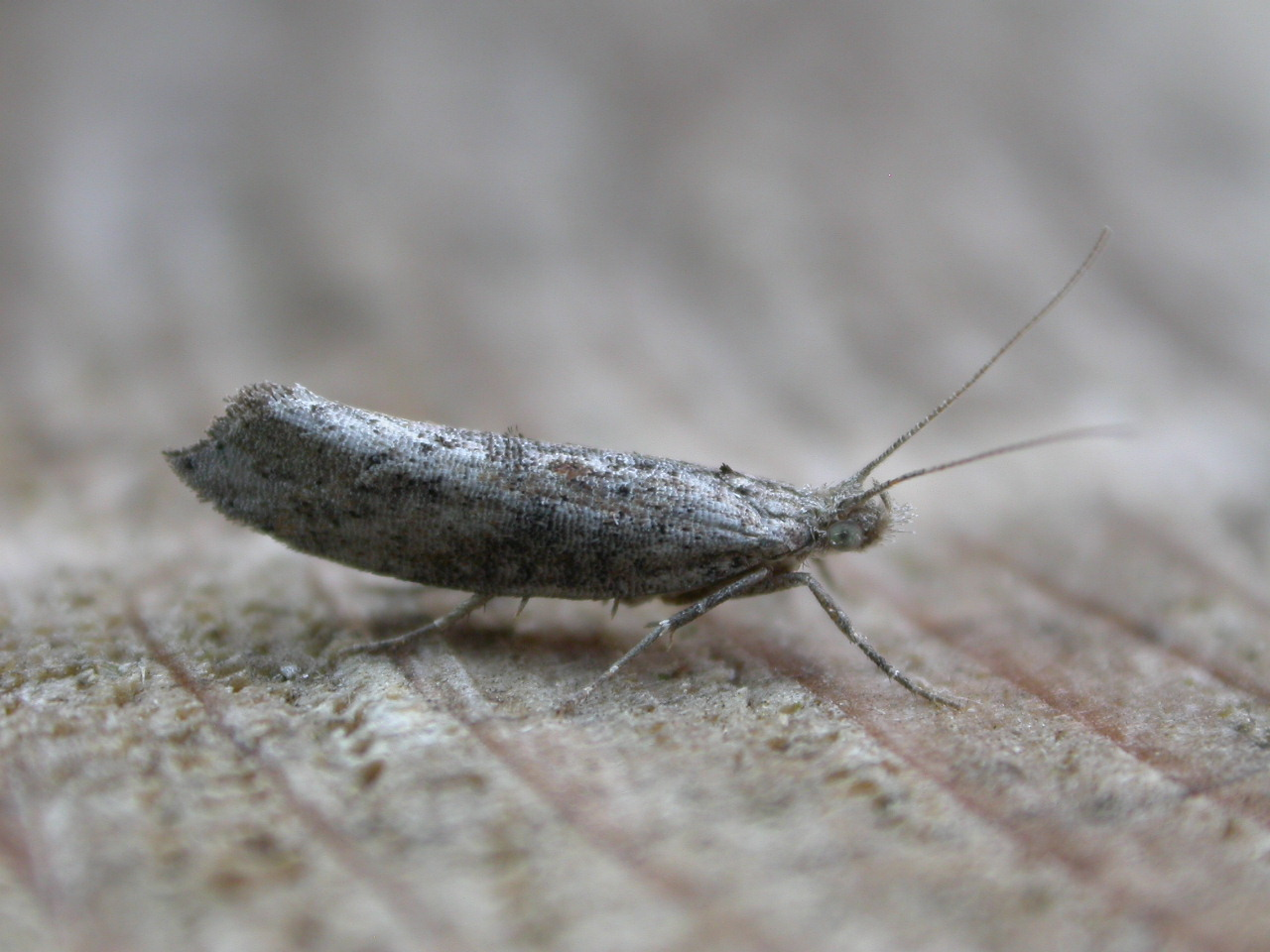

Scientific classification
- Domain: Eukaryota
- Kingdom: Animalia
- Phylum: Arthropoda
- Class: Insecta
- Order: Lepidoptera
- Family: Ypsolophidae
- Genus: Ypsolopha
- Species: Y. horridella

Binomial name
- Ypsolopha horridella (Treitschke, 1835)

Synonyms
- Harpipteryx horridella Treitschke, 1835

= Ypsolopha horridella =

Species of moth

Ypsolopha horridella is a moth of the family Ypsolophidae. It is found in northern and central Europe, the Middle East, China and Russia.

The wingspan is 16–21 mm. Adults are on wing from July to August.
