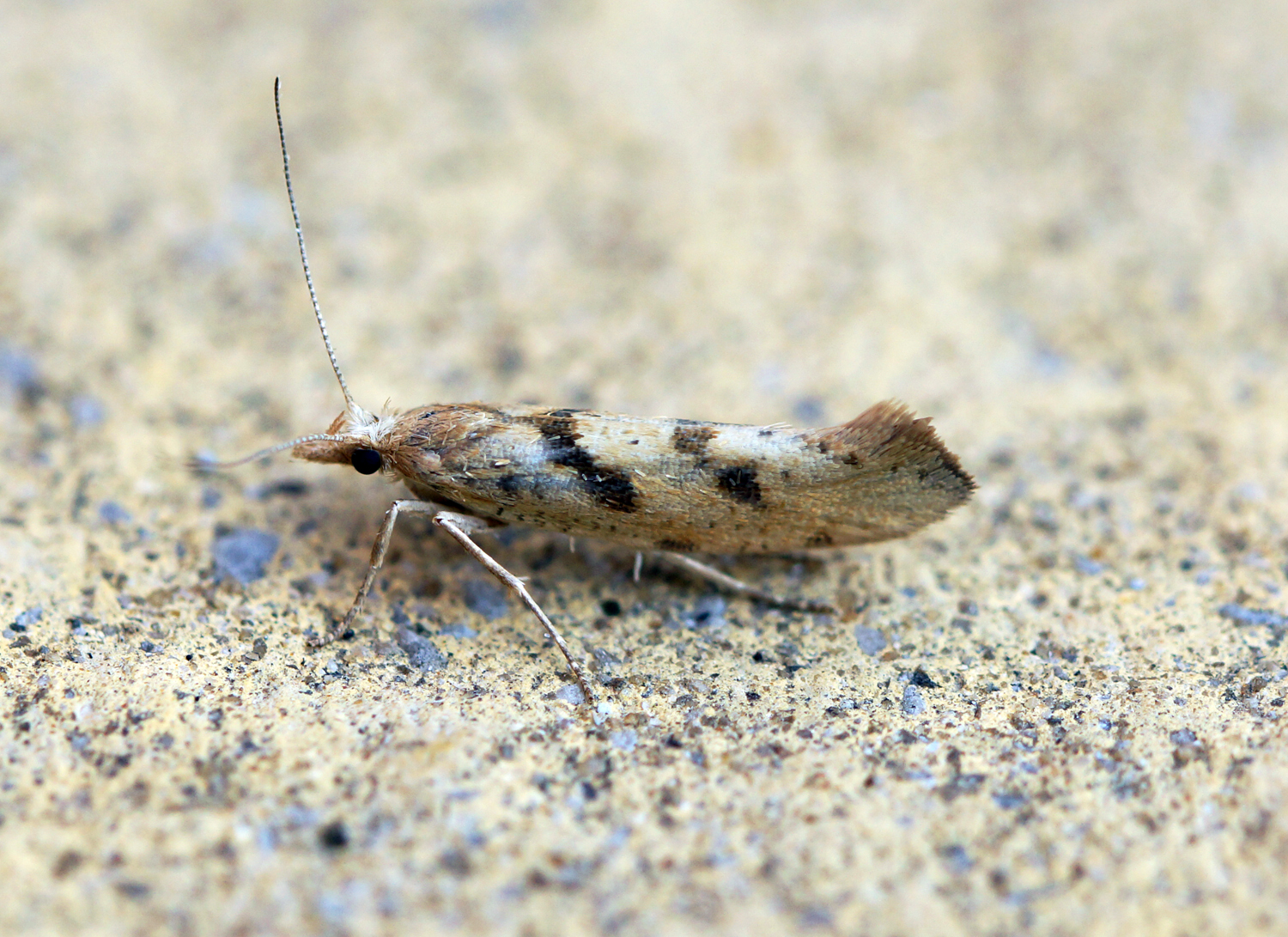

Scientific classification
- Kingdom: Animalia
- Phylum: Arthropoda
- Class: Insecta
- Order: Lepidoptera
- Family: Ypsolophidae
- Genus: Ypsolopha
- Species: Y. sylvella

Binomial name
- Ypsolopha sylvella (Linnaeus, 1767)

Synonyms
- Phalaena sylvella Linnaeus, 1767

= Ypsolopha sylvella =

Species of moth

Ypsolopha sylvella is a moth of the family Ypsolophidae. It is found in most of Europe.

The wingspan is 18–20 mm. Adults are on wing from August to September. There is one generation per year.

The larvae feed on the leaves of Quercus species.
