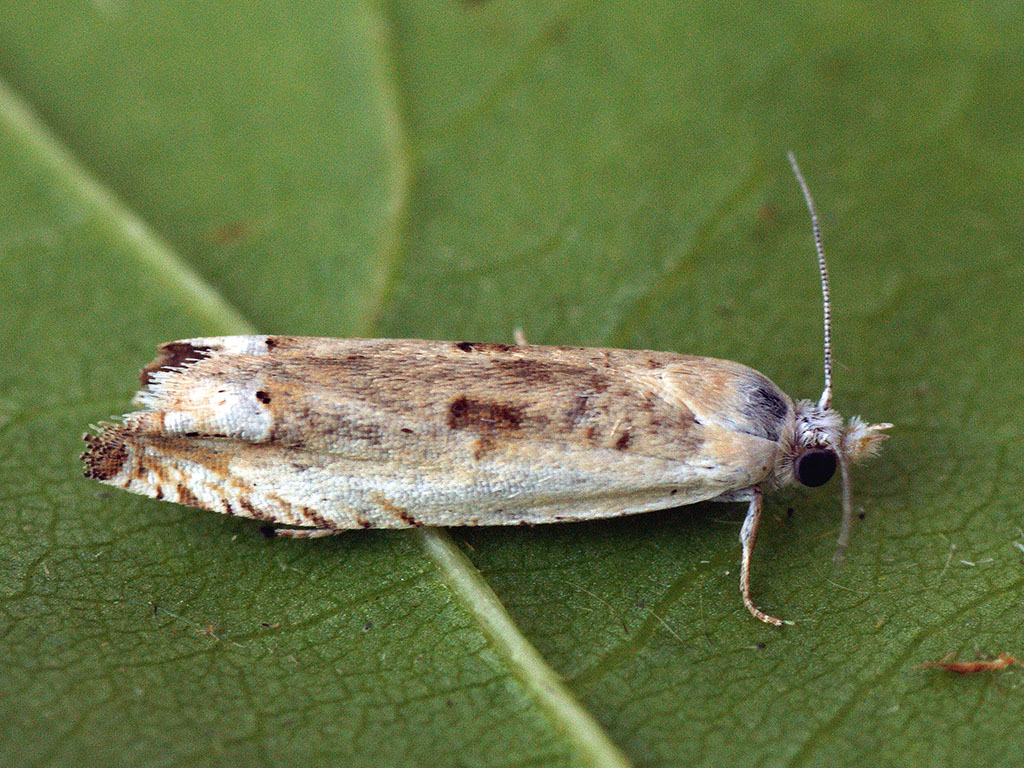

Scientific classification
- Kingdom: Animalia
- Phylum: Arthropoda
- Clade: Pancrustacea
- Class: Insecta
- Order: Lepidoptera
- Family: Tortricidae
- Genus: Eucosma
- Species: E. lacteana

Binomial name
- Eucosma lacteana (Treitschke, 1835)

= Eucosma lacteana =

Species of moth

Eucosma lacteana is a moth belonging to the family Tortricidae. The species was first described by Georg Friedrich Treitschke in 1835.

It is native to Europe.
