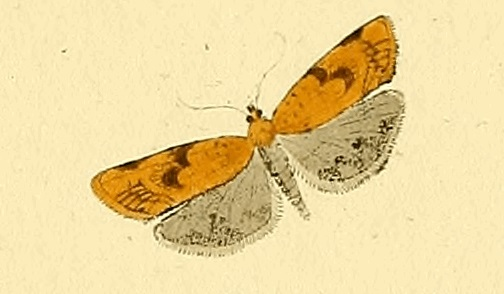

Scientific classification
- Kingdom: Animalia
- Phylum: Arthropoda
- Clade: Pancrustacea
- Class: Insecta
- Order: Lepidoptera
- Family: Tortricidae
- Genus: Clepsis
- Species: C. steineriana

Binomial name
- Clepsis steineriana (Hubner, [1796-1799])

Synonyms
- Tortrix steineriana Hubner, [1796-1799]; Tortrix steineriana var. caprana Della Beffa, 1935; Clepsis chrisitana Razowski, 1979; Tortrix chrysitana Frolich, 1828 (preocc.); Pseudomelia roganodes Hannemann, 1960

= Clepsis steineriana =

Species of moth

Clepsis steineriana is a species of moth of the family Tortricidae. It is found in Spain, Portugal, France, Germany, Austria, Switzerland, Italy, the Czech Republic, Slovakia, Slovenia, Bosnia and Herzegovina, Poland, Greece and Russia.

The wingspan is 21–22 mm for males and 17–20 mm for females. Adults have been recorded on wing from July to August.

The larvae feed on Vaccinium myrtillus, Vaccinium uliginosum, Veratrum album, Pulsatilla vulgaris and Luzula species.
