= Eucosma albidulana =

Scientific classification
- Kingdom: Animalia
- Phylum: Arthropoda
- Clade: Pancrustacea
- Class: Insecta
- Order: Lepidoptera
- Family: Tortricidae
- Genus: Eucosma
- Species: E. albidulana

Binomial name
- Eucosma albidulana (Herrich-Schäffer, 1851)

Species of moth

Eucosma albidulana is a moth belonging to the family Tortricidae. The species was first described by Gottlieb August Wilhelm Herrich-Schäffer in 1851.

It is native to Europe.
