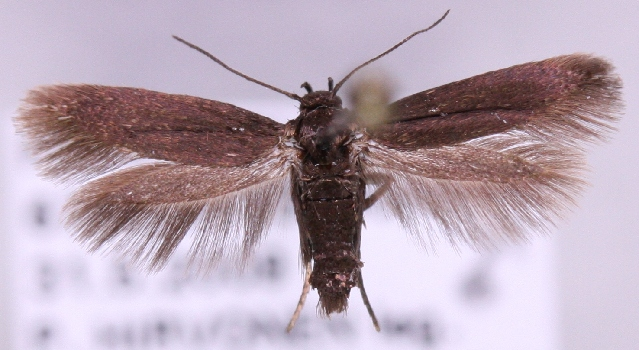

Scientific classification
- Kingdom: Animalia
- Phylum: Arthropoda
- Class: Insecta
- Order: Lepidoptera
- Family: Scythrididae
- Genus: Scythris
- Species: S. potentillella

Binomial name
- Scythris potentillella (Zeller, 1847)

Synonyms
- Butalis potentillella Zeller, 1847; Butalis potentillae Zeller, 1855; Scythris albiapex Hering, 1924

= Scythris potentillella =

Species of moth

Scythris potentillella is a moth of the family Scythrididae first described by the German entomologist Philipp Christoph Zeller in 1847. It is found in Asia Minor and Europe.

== Description ==
The wingspan is 8–12 mm. Adults are on wing from May to August, possibly in two generations per year.

The larvae feed on common sorrel (Rumex acetosa) and sheep's sorrel (Rumex acetosella) and can be found in April and May.

== Distribution ==
It is found from most of Europe (except Ireland, Portugal, Italy, most of the Balkan Peninsula, Ukraine, Latvia and Estonia) to Asia Minor. The habitat consists of dry sandy areas.
