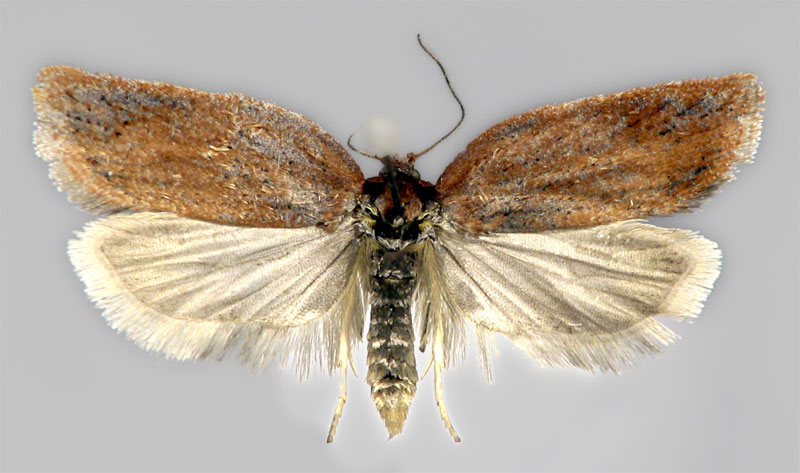

Scientific classification
- Domain: Eukaryota
- Kingdom: Animalia
- Phylum: Arthropoda
- Class: Insecta
- Order: Lepidoptera
- Family: Tortricidae
- Genus: Acleris
- Species: A. rufana

Binomial name
- Acleris rufana (Denis & Schiffermüller, 1775)

Synonyms
- Tortrix rufana [Denis & Schiffermuller], 1775; Phalaena (Tortrix) apiciana Hubner, 1793; Tortrix bistriana Haworth, [1811]; Peronea crassana Duponchel, in Godart, 1842; Teras lucidana Treitschke, 1830; Acalla olseniana Larsen, 1927; Peronea similana Curtis, 1834; Acalla rufana ab. wolfschlageriana Hauder, 1918

= Acleris rufana =

Species of moth

Acleris rufana is a moth of the family Tortricidae. It is found from northern, central and south-western Europe through southern Siberia to the Russian Far East and Japan.

The wingspan is about 19 mm. The thorax has a slight posterior crest. The forewings are suboblong, light yellow ochreous to dark grey. The tufts are slight and the costa is usually suffused with whitish from base to beyond middle. Sometimes there is a grey or fuscous triangular blotch on the costa posteriorly, and a dorsal spot towards the base and sometimes a ferruginous central longitudinal streak to the apex. The hindwings are pale grey, the apex darker. The larva is dark grey, blackish, or blackish-green; head black or dark brown; plate of 2 black.

Adults are on wing from August to October. The adult moths hibernate over winter and can reappear in spring.

The larvae mainly feed on Myrica gale, but have also been recorded on Salix.
