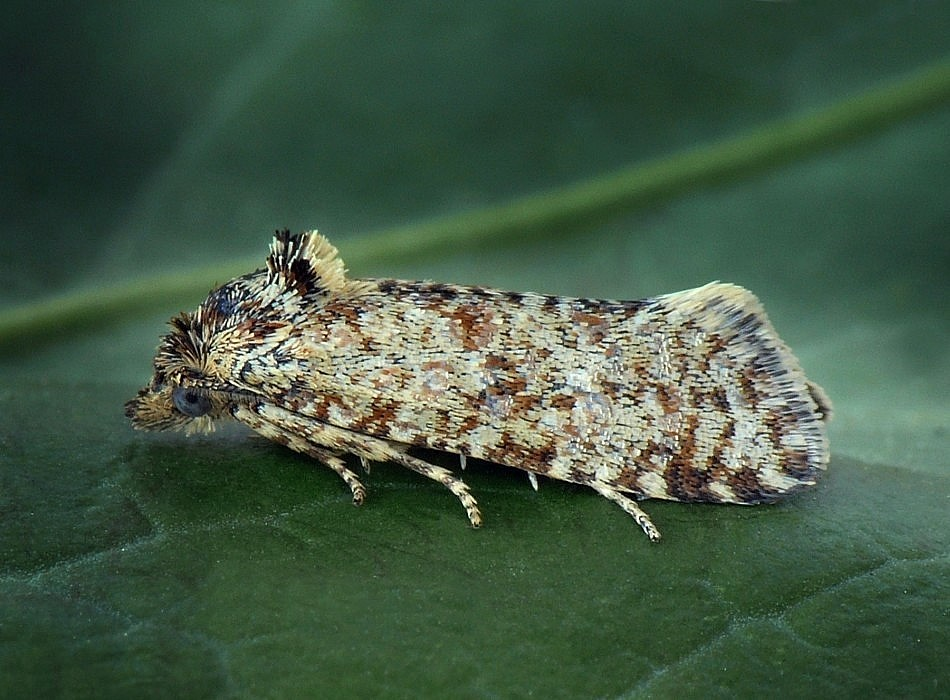

Scientific classification
- Domain: Eukaryota
- Kingdom: Animalia
- Phylum: Arthropoda
- Class: Insecta
- Order: Lepidoptera
- Family: Tortricidae
- Genus: Aethes
- Species: A. margarotana

Binomial name
- Aethes margarotana (Duponchel, 1836)

Synonyms
- Argyrolepia margarotana Duponchel, in Godart, 1836; Euxanthis edrisitana Chretien, in Oberthur, 1922; Argyrolepia maritimana Guenee, 1845; Falseuncaria paralellana Razowski, 1961; Phalonia parallelana Kennel, 1913; Phalonia paronyma Meyrick, 1932; Aethes margarotana ab. posticialba Obraztsov, 1952; Conchylis margarotana f. stygiana Rebel, 1916; Coccyx scabidulana Lederer, 1855

= Aethes margarotana =

Species of moth

Aethes margarotana is a species of moth of the family Tortricidae. It was described by Philogène Auguste Joseph Duponchel in 1836. It is found in most of Europe (except Ireland, the Benelux, Fennoscandia, Poland, the Baltic region, Switzerland and part of the Balkan Peninsula), Russia, North Africa and Iran. The habitat consists of sand-dunes and shingle beaches.

The wingspan is 13–17 millimetres (0.51–0.67 in).

The larvae feed on the flowers of Eryngium maritimum.
