= Cuprina fuscella =

Scientific classification
- Kingdom: Animalia
- Phylum: Arthropoda
- Clade: Pancrustacea
- Class: Insecta
- Order: Lepidoptera
- Family: Stathmopodidae
- Genus: Cuprina
- Species: C. fuscella

Binomial name
- Cuprina fuscella Sinev, 1988

Species of moth

Cuprina fuscella is a moth in the Stathmopodidae family. It was described by Sinev in 1988. It is found in Austria, Finland, and eastern Siberia.

The larvae feed on Onoclea sensibilis.
