= Phiaris obsoletana =

Scientific classification
- Domain: Eukaryota
- Kingdom: Animalia
- Phylum: Arthropoda
- Class: Insecta
- Order: Lepidoptera
- Family: Tortricidae
- Genus: Phiaris
- Species: P. obsoletana

Binomial name
- Phiaris obsoletana (Zetterstedt, 1839)

Species of moth

Phiaris obsoletana is a species of moth belonging to the family Tortricidae.

It is native to Europe.
