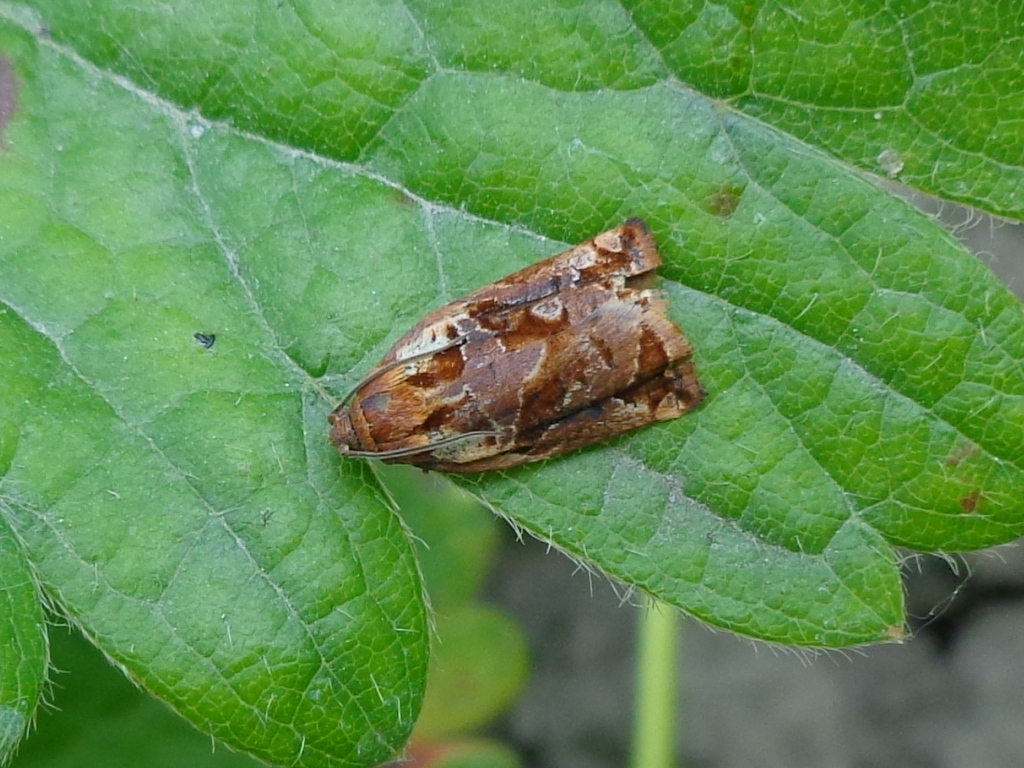

Scientific classification
- Kingdom: Animalia
- Phylum: Arthropoda
- Clade: Pancrustacea
- Class: Insecta
- Order: Lepidoptera
- Family: Tortricidae
- Genus: Archips
- Species: A. betulana

Binomial name
- Archips betulana (Hübner, 1787)

Synonyms
- List: Phalaena (Tortrix) betulana Hubner, [1787]; Tortrix decretana Treitschke, 1835; Archips decretana qinghai Liu, 1987; Tortrix testaceana Eversmann, 1844

= Archips betulana =

Species of moth

Archips betulana is a moth of the family Tortricidae. It is found from Fennoscandia south to Italy, Austria and Slovakia and from the Netherlands and Belgium east to southern Russia and the eastern part of the Palearctic realm.

It is extinct in Great Britain, where it was only known from damp heathland in the neighbourhood of King's Lynn in Norfolk. It was first recorded in around 1881 and was last seen around 1900.

Its wingspan is 18–28 mm and it can be found in August hiding amongst foliage.

The larvae feed between spun leaves, on birch (Betula species), Hazel (Corylus species), bog-myrtle (Myrica gale) and bilberry (Vaccinium myrtillus). The larvae can be found from May to June.
