= Scythris tributella =

Scientific classification
- Kingdom: Animalia
- Phylum: Arthropoda
- Clade: Pancrustacea
- Class: Insecta
- Order: Lepidoptera
- Family: Scythrididae
- Genus: Scythris
- Species: S. tributella

Binomial name
- Scythris tributella (Zeller, 1847)

Synonyms
- Oecophora tributella Zeller, 1847; Oecophora terrenella Zeller, 1847; Oecophora parvella Herrich-Schäffer, 1855; Oecophora denigratella Herrich-Schäffer, 1855; Butalis serella Constant, 1885; Scythris karnyella Rebel, 1918; Scythris monotinctella Turati, 1924; Scythris bulbosella Lhomme, 1949; Scythris igaloensis Amsel, 1951; Butalis cinefactella Bruand, 1851

Species of moth

Scythris tributella is a moth of the family Scythrididae. It was described by Philipp Christoph Zeller in 1847. It is found in central and southern Europe, North Africa (Libya) and Russia (southern Urals), Georgia, Turkey and Turkmenistan.

The wingspan is 9–12 mm. The fore- and hindwings are chocolate brown without markings. The wings are slightly shiny at the base, the head and abdomen black, and the hindwings lighter than the forewings.

The larvae feed on Coronilla varia.
