= Eucosma lugubrana =

Scientific classification
- Kingdom: Animalia
- Phylum: Arthropoda
- Clade: Pancrustacea
- Class: Insecta
- Order: Lepidoptera
- Family: Tortricidae
- Genus: Eucosma
- Species: E. lugubrana

Binomial name
- Eucosma lugubrana (Treitschke, 1830)

Synonyms
- Penthina lugubrana Treitschke, 1830; Pygolopha tariki Hartig, 1949; Pygolopha tinacriana Lederer, 1859; Pygolopha trinacriana Rebel, 1901

Species of moth

Eucosma lugubrana is a species of moth of the family Tortricidae. It is found on Sicily and in France, Austria, Italy, Slovakia, Hungary, North Macedonia, Greece and Russia, Kazakhstan and Kyrgyzstan.

The wingspan is 17–22 mm. Adults have been recorded on wing from June to July.

The larvae feed on Allium species.
