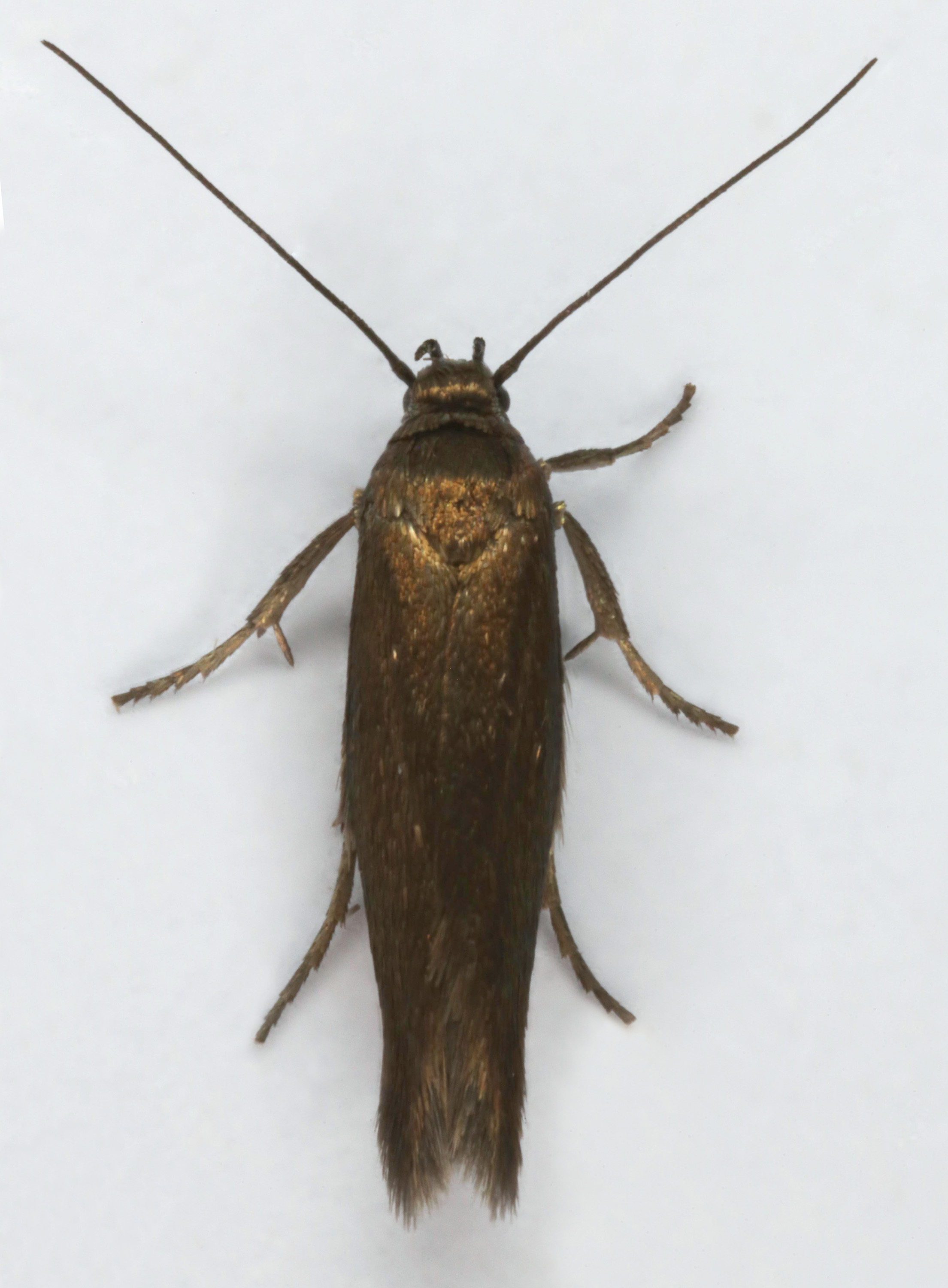

Scientific classification
- Kingdom: Animalia
- Phylum: Arthropoda
- Class: Insecta
- Order: Lepidoptera
- Family: Scythrididae
- Genus: Scythris
- Species: S. crassiuscula

Binomial name
- Scythris crassiuscula (Herrich-Schäffer, 1855)

Synonyms
- Oecophora crassiuscula Herrich-Schäffer, 1855

= Scythris crassiuscula =

Species of moth

Scythris picaepennis is a moth of the family Scythrididae first described by the German entomologist Gottlieb August Wilhelm Herrich-Schäffer in 1855. It is found in Europe.

== Description ==
The moth has a wingspan of circa 10 mm. The forewings are rather short-pointed, shining dark bronzy. Hindwings nearly 1, cilia less than 2; dark purplish -fuscous; 4 and 5 connate or stalked Abdomen in female beneath with an ochreous- whitish suffusion on anteapical segment. The moth flies during the day from June to September. The larvae form a loose spinning near the base of its food plant, rock-rose (Helianthemum species), eating the upper surface of the lower leaves.
