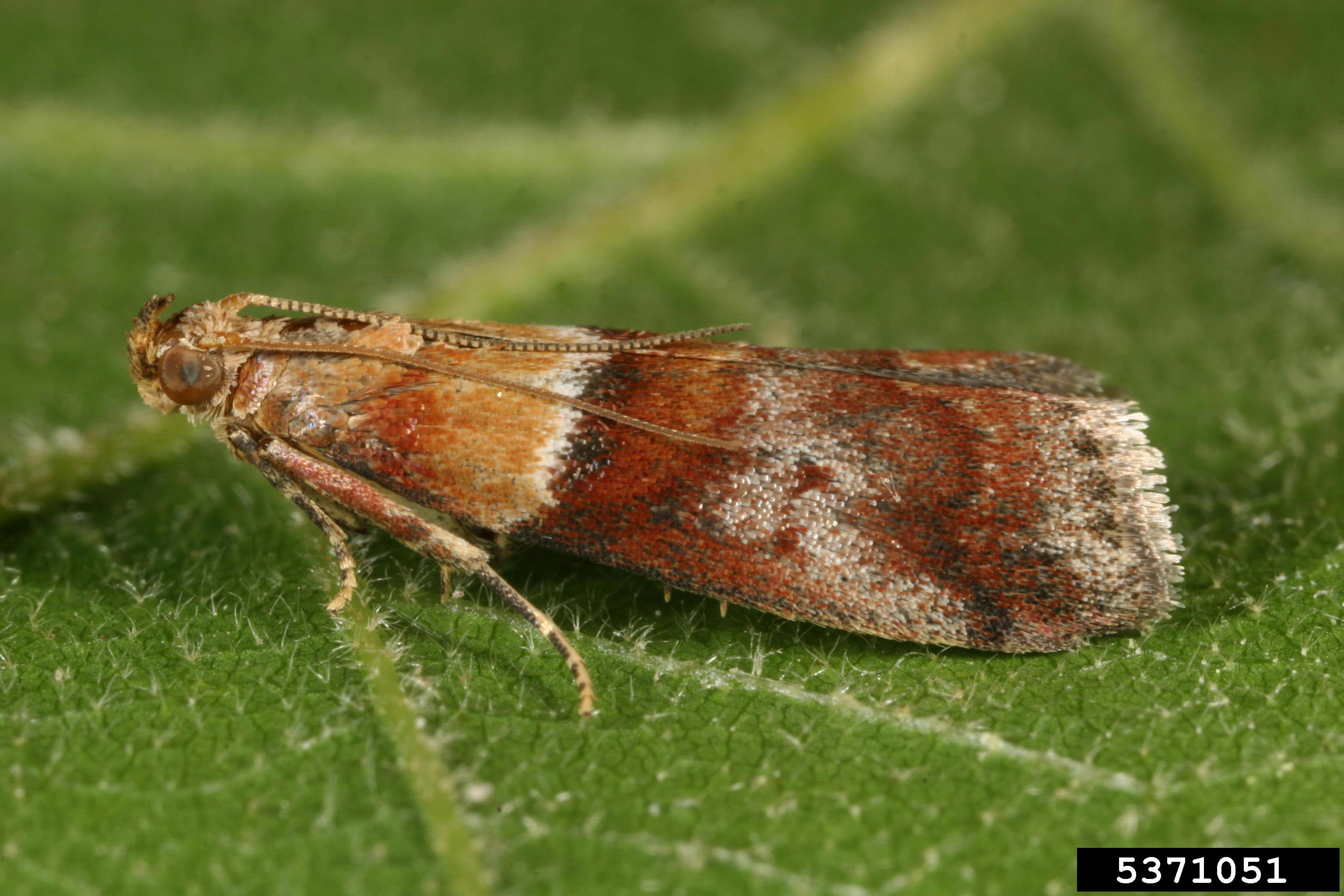

Scientific classification
- Kingdom: Animalia
- Phylum: Arthropoda
- Clade: Pancrustacea
- Class: Insecta
- Order: Lepidoptera
- Family: Pyralidae
- Genus: Acrobasis
- Species: A. repandana

Binomial name
- Acrobasis repandana (Fabricius, 1798)

Synonyms
- Pyralis repandana Fabricius, 1798; Conobathra repandana; Phycis tumidella Zincken, 1818; Acrobasis zelleri Ragonot, 1885

= Acrobasis repandana =

Species of moth

Acrobasis repandana is a moth of the family Pyralidae. It is found in Europe.

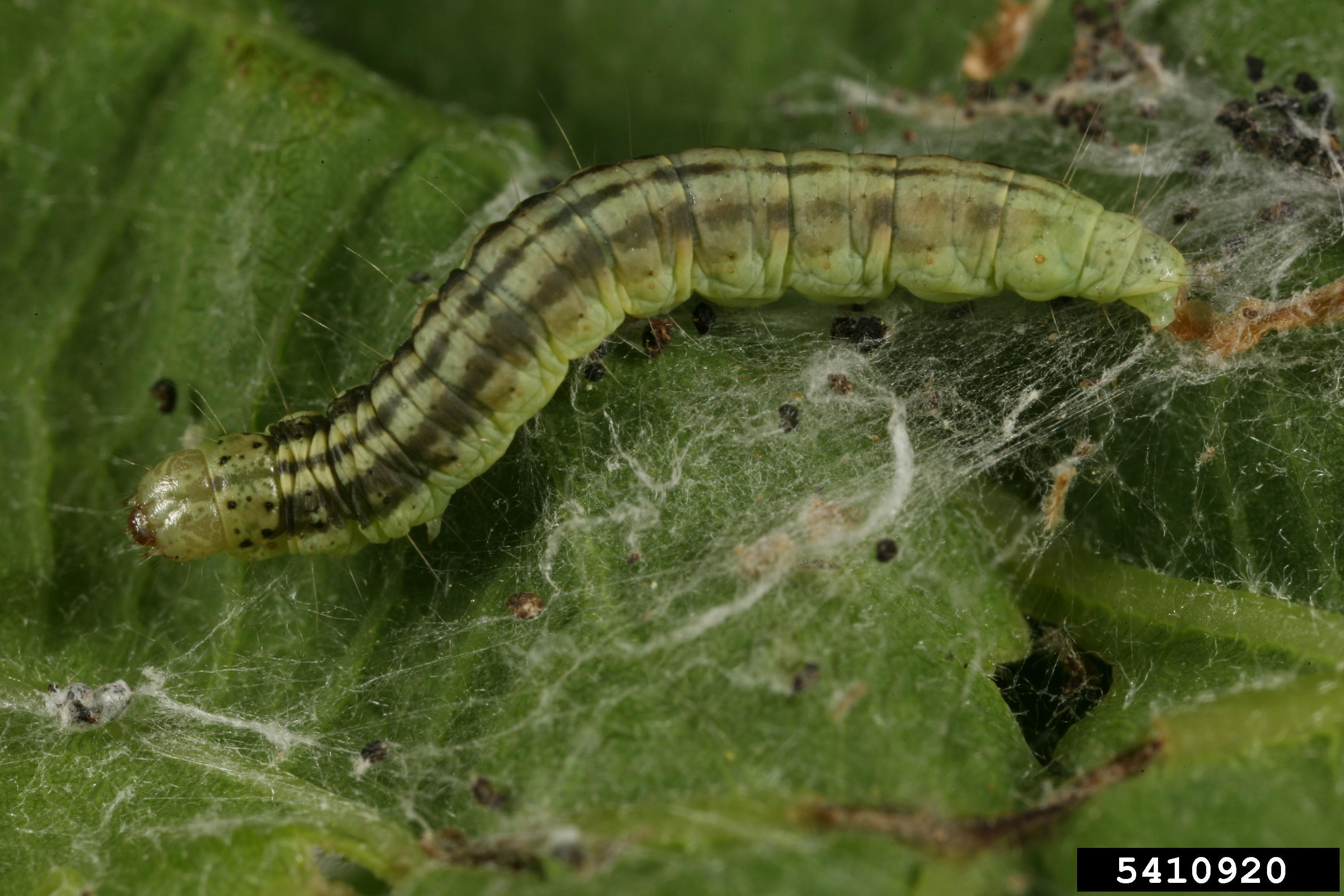
Larva

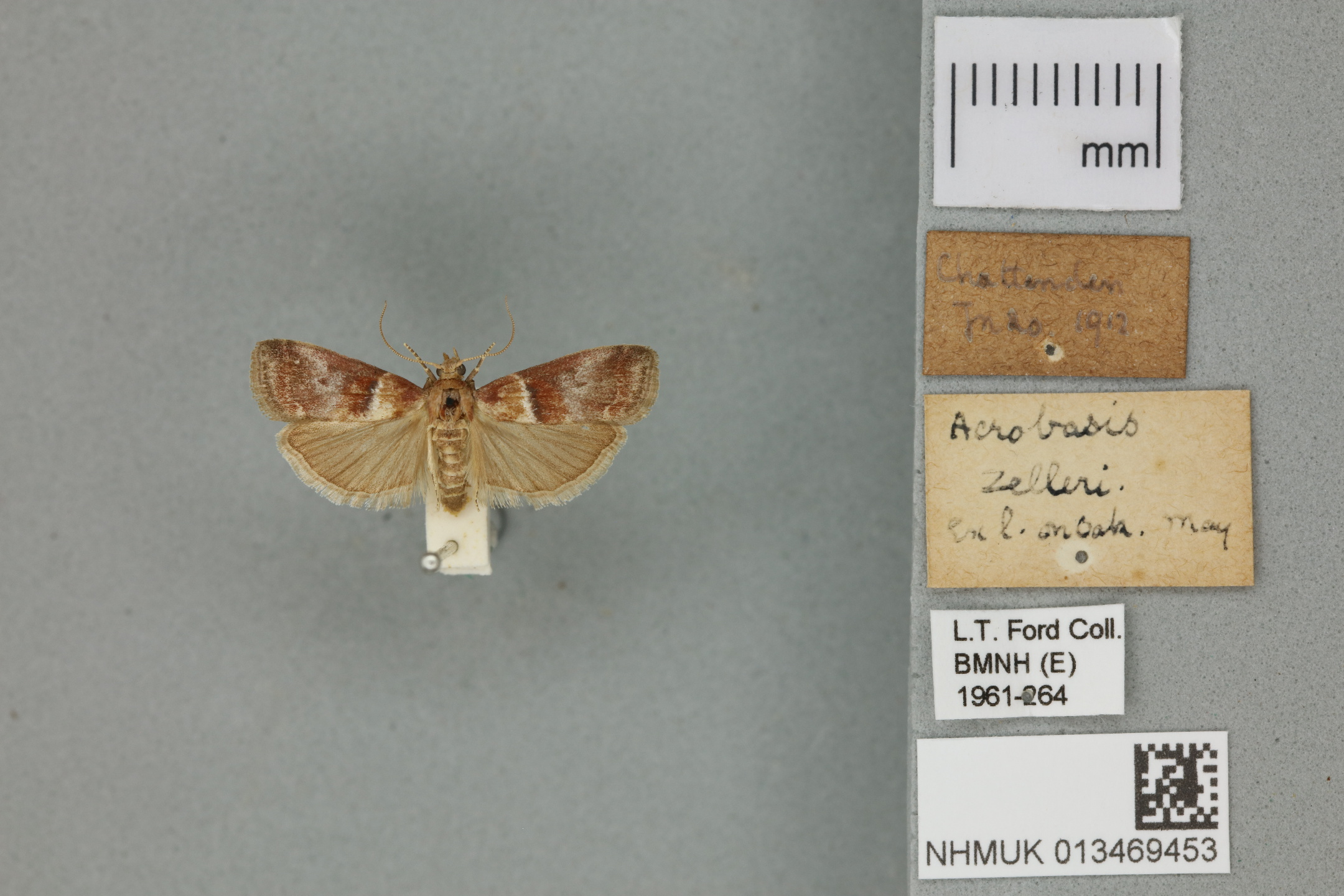
Pinned specimen of Acrobasis repandana

The wingspan is 20–25 mm. The moth flies from June to August depending on the location.

The larvae feed on oak.
