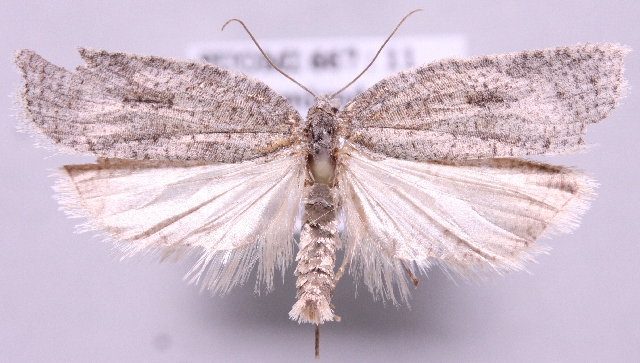

Scientific classification
- Kingdom: Animalia
- Phylum: Arthropoda
- Clade: Pancrustacea
- Class: Insecta
- Order: Lepidoptera
- Family: Tortricidae
- Genus: Acleris
- Species: A. roscidana

Binomial name
- Acleris roscidana (Hübner, 1796–1799)

Synonyms
- Tortrix roscidana Hubner, 1796–1799; Tortrix nebulana Hubner, [1796–1799]

= Acleris roscidana =

Species of moth

Acleris roscidana is a species of moth of the family Tortricidae. It is found in France, Germany, Austria, Switzerland, Italy, the Czech Republic, Slovakia, Hungary, Poland, Romania, Norway, Sweden, Finland, the Baltic region, Ukraine and Russia.

The wingspan is 26–28 mm. Adults are on wing from September to March.

The larvae feed on Populus tremula. Larvae can be found from June to July.
