= Aethes deutschiana =

Scientific classification
- Kingdom: Animalia
- Phylum: Arthropoda
- Clade: Pancrustacea
- Class: Insecta
- Order: Lepidoptera
- Family: Tortricidae
- Genus: Aethes
- Species: A. deutschiana

Binomial name
- Aethes deutschiana (Zetterstedt, [1839)])

Synonyms
- Tortrix deutschiana Zetterstedt, 1839; Conchylis chalcana Packard, 1866; Aethes fuscostriana Razowski, 1997; Lozopera fuscostrigana Clemens, 1864; Cochylis lutulentana Herrich-Schaffer, 1856

Species of moth

Aethes deutschiana is a moth of the family Tortricidae. It was described by Zetterstedt in 1839. It is found in south-eastern France, Italy, Switzerland, Austria, Norway, Sweden, northern Finland, Karelia, Bulgaria, Russia (Usgent, Altai, Alai, Sajan, Munko-Sardyk), Armenia, Iran, Japan and North America.

The wingspan is 15–23 millimetres (0.59–0.91 in). Adults are on wing from April to August in western Europe.
