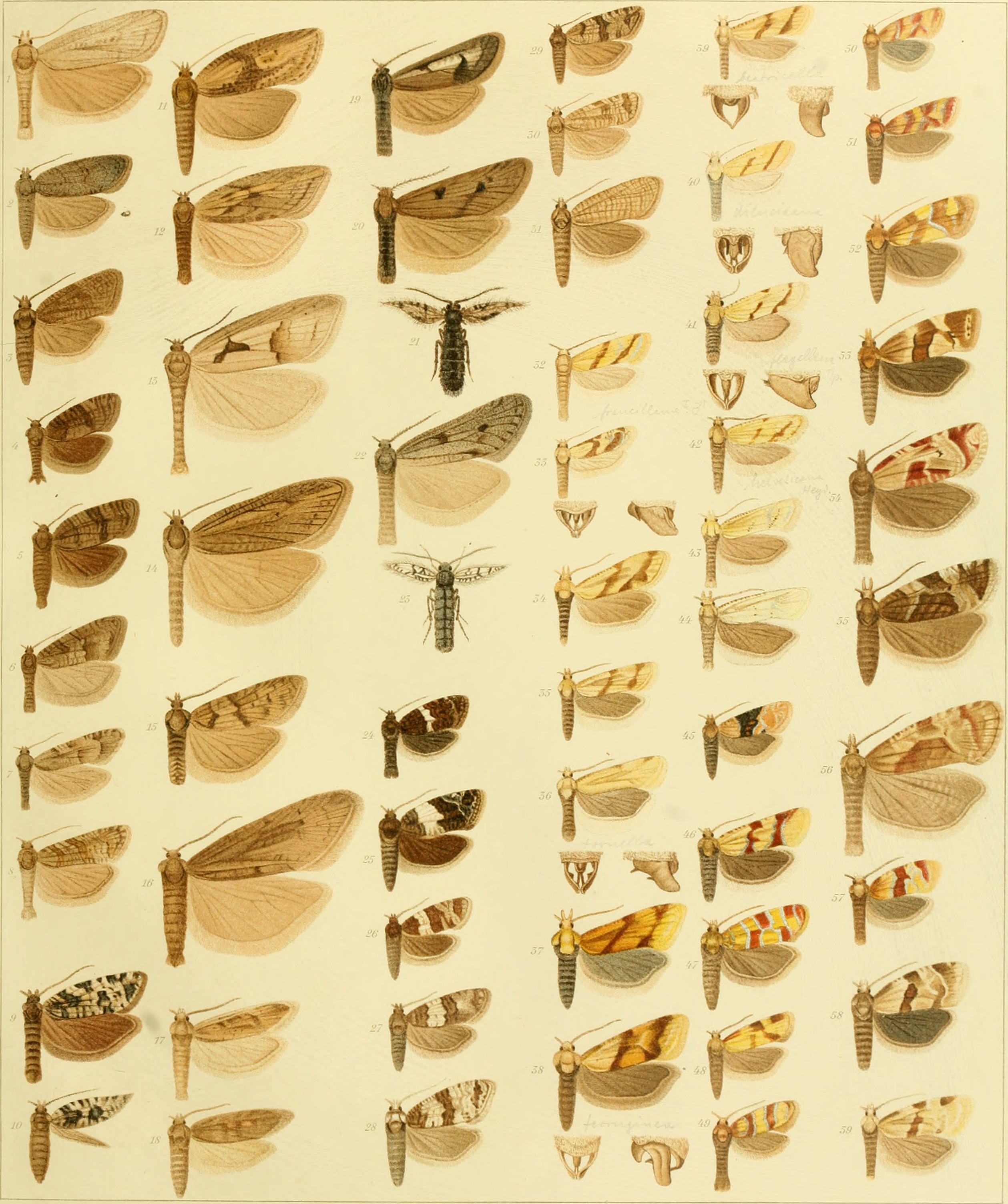
- Aethes sanguinana as Phalonia sanguinana in Die palaearktischen tortriciden figure 46

Scientific classification
- Domain: Eukaryota
- Kingdom: Animalia
- Phylum: Arthropoda
- Class: Insecta
- Order: Lepidoptera
- Family: Tortricidae
- Genus: Aethes
- Species: A. sanguinana

Binomial name
- Aethes sanguinana (Treitschke, 1830)

Synonyms
- Tortrix sanguinana Treitschke, 1830; Aethes sanguinea Humphreys & Westwood, 1845; Lozopera sanguinella Bradley Tremewan & Smith, 1973

= Aethes sanguinana =

Species of moth

Aethes sanguinana is a species of moth of the family Tortricidae. It was described by Treitschke in 1830. It is found in most of southern and central Europe, Morocco, Algeria and Asia Minor.

The wingspan is 13–18 millimetres (0.51–0.71 in). Adults are on wing from May to July.

The larvae feed on Eryngium campestre. Larvae have been recorded from January to March, in July and from September to December.
