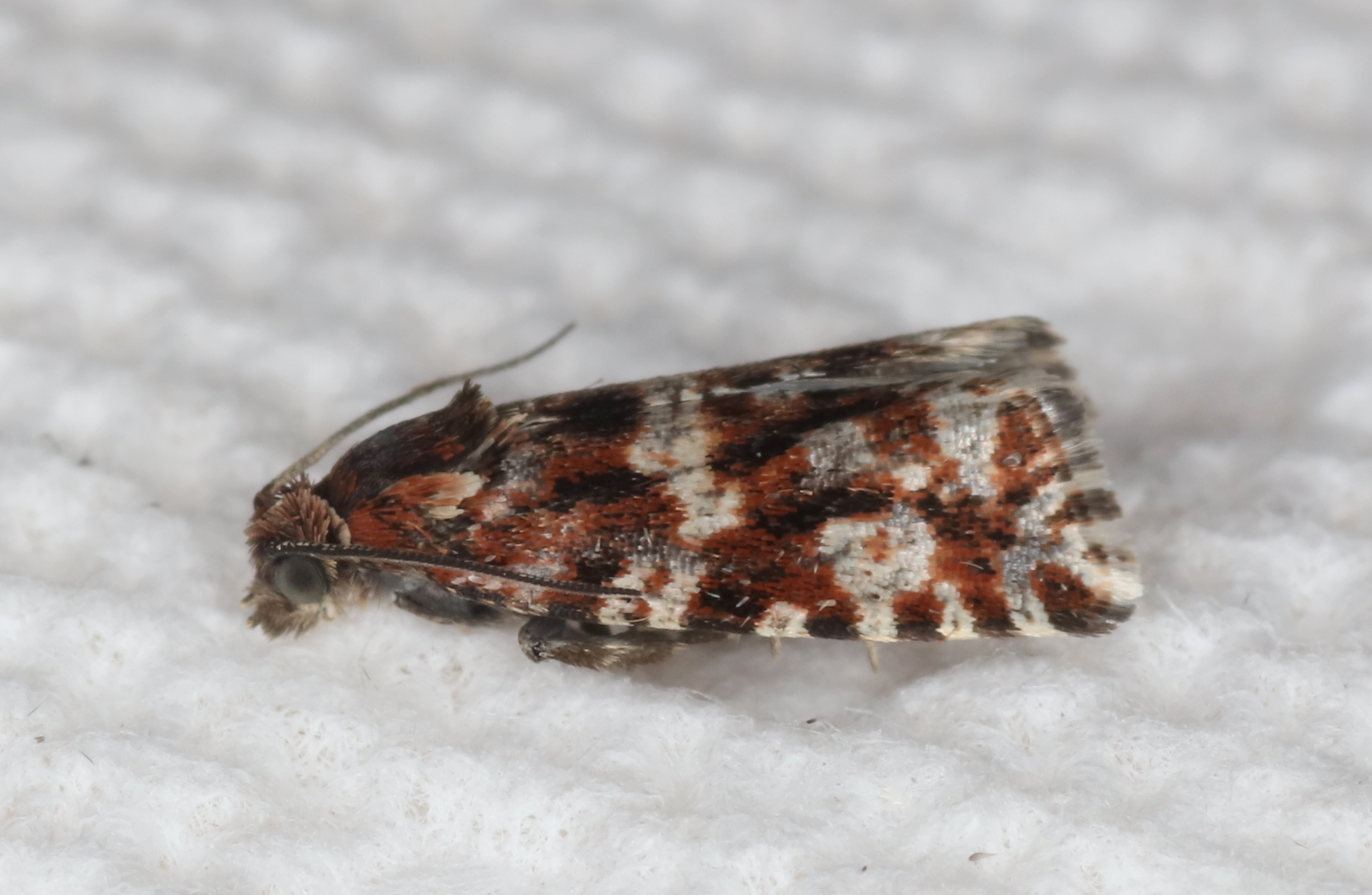

Scientific classification
- Kingdom: Animalia
- Phylum: Arthropoda
- Class: Insecta
- Order: Lepidoptera
- Family: Tortricidae
- Genus: Phiaris
- Species: P. septentrionana

Binomial name
- Phiaris septentrionana (Curtis, 1835)

= Phiaris septentrionana =

Species of moth

Phiaris septentrionana is a species of moth belonging to the family Tortricidae.

It is native to Northern Europe.
