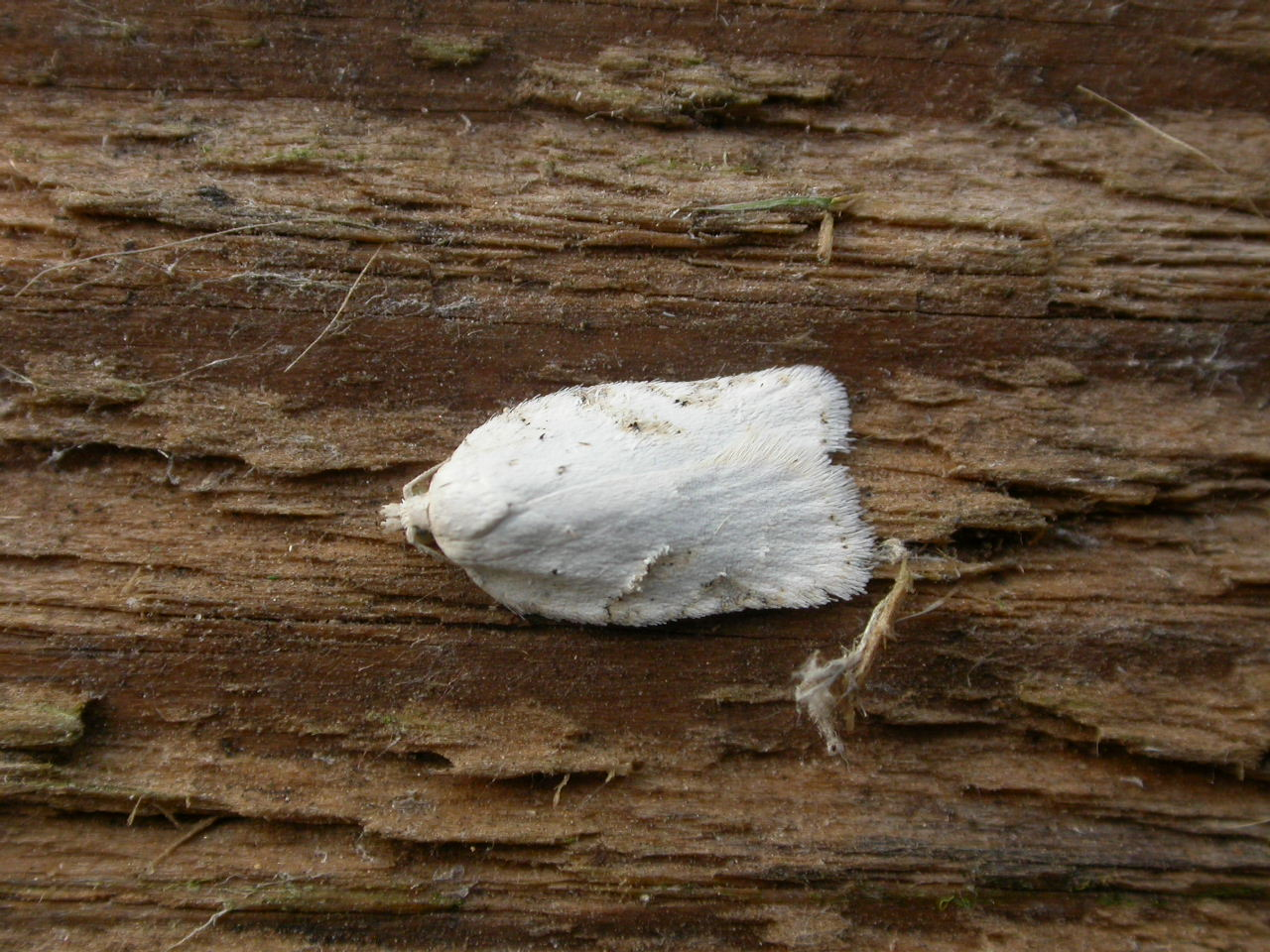

Scientific classification
- Domain: Eukaryota
- Kingdom: Animalia
- Phylum: Arthropoda
- Class: Insecta
- Order: Lepidoptera
- Family: Tortricidae
- Genus: Acleris
- Species: A. kochiella

Binomial name
- Acleris kochiella (Goeze, 1783)

Synonyms
- Phalaena (Tinea) kochiana Goeze, 1783; Acleris boscana (Fabricius, 1794); Acleris cerusana (Hübner, 1799); Acleris ulmana (Duponchel, 1836); Acleris parisiana (Guenée, 1845); Pyralis boscana Fabricius, 1894; Tortrix cerusana Hübner, [1799]; Glyphiptera spectrana Duponchel, 1836; Glyphiptera ulmana Duponchel, 1835; Leptogramma parisiana Guenée, 1845; Teras boscana ab. flava Norriel, 1913; Teras boscana ab. cineria Norriel, 1913; Acalla boscana Kennel, 1909; Pyralis scabrana Fabricius, 1781

= Acleris kochiella =

Species of moth

Acleris kochiella is a moth of the family Tortricidae. It is found in most of Europe, Kazakhstan, the Ural region, Irkutsk and China.

The wingspan is 15–18 mm. Adults are on the wing from June to July and in September. There are two generations per year.

The larvae feed on Ulmus species. They feed on folded or spun leaves.
