= Scythris fallacella =

Scientific classification
- Kingdom: Animalia
- Phylum: Arthropoda
- Class: Insecta
- Order: Lepidoptera
- Family: Scythrididae
- Genus: Scythris
- Species: S. fallacella

Binomial name
- Scythris fallacella (Schläger, 1847)

Synonyms
- Oecophora fallacella Schläger, 1847

Species of moth

Scythris fallacella is a moth of the family Scythrididae found in Europe.

== Description ==
The moth has a wingspan of circa 15 mm and are on the wing in May and June. There may be a possible second generation in August.

The larva feed within a silken web on rock-rose (Helianthemum species) and pupate in the soil.
