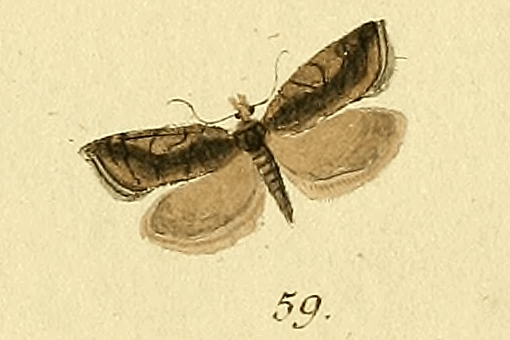

Scientific classification
- Kingdom: Animalia
- Phylum: Arthropoda
- Clade: Pancrustacea
- Class: Insecta
- Order: Lepidoptera
- Family: Tortricidae
- Genus: Acleris
- Species: A. umbrana

Binomial name
- Acleris umbrana (Hubner, 1796-1799)

Synonyms
- Tortrix umbrana Hubner, 1796-1799; Peronea umbrana f. brunneana Sheldon, 1930; Peronea umbrana f. lamprana Sheldon, 1930

= Acleris umbrana =

Species of moth

Acleris umbrana is a species of moth of the family Tortricidae. It is found in Great Britain, France, Belgium, Germany, Austria, Switzerland, Italy, the Czech Republic, Slovakia, Poland, Hungary, Norway, Sweden, Finland, the Baltic region and Russia. In the east, the range extends to Japan. The habitat consists of woodland, fens and marshes.

The wingspan is 18–23 mm. Adults are on wing in one generation from July and August to late October and, after overwintering, from late February to early May.

The larvae feed on Sorbus aucuparia, Alnus glutinosa, Cornus sanguinea, Salix caprea, Prunus spinosa, Prunus avium, Crataegus and Carpinus species. They feed within spun leaves of their host plant. Larvae can be found in June and July. The species overwinters as an adult.
