= Eucosma balatonana =

Scientific classification
- Kingdom: Animalia
- Phylum: Arthropoda
- Clade: Pancrustacea
- Class: Insecta
- Order: Lepidoptera
- Family: Tortricidae
- Genus: Eucosma
- Species: E. balatonana

Binomial name
- Eucosma balatonana (Osthelder, 1937)

Species of moth

Eucosma balatonana is a moth belonging to the family Tortricidae. The species was first described by Osthelder in 1937.

It is native to Europe.
