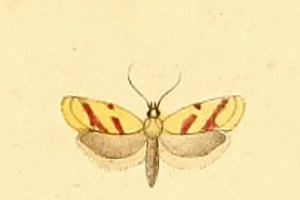

Scientific classification
- Domain: Eukaryota
- Kingdom: Animalia
- Phylum: Arthropoda
- Class: Insecta
- Order: Lepidoptera
- Family: Tortricidae
- Genus: Aethes
- Species: A. flagellana

Binomial name
- Aethes flagellana (Duponchel, in Godart, 1836)

Synonyms
- Argyrolepia flagellana Duponchel, in Godart, 1836; Aethes eryngiella Vallot, 1829; Lozopera flagellana sardoa Amsel, in Hartig & Amsel, 1952

= Aethes flagellana =

Species of moth

Aethes flagellana is a species of moth of the family Tortricidae. It is found on Corsica, Sardinia, Sicily and Crete and in the Netherlands, France, Spain, Italy, Germany, Austria, Switzerland, the Czech Republic, Slovakia, Slovenia, Poland, Albania, Hungary, Bulgaria, Romania, North Macedonia, Greece, Lithuania, Ukraine, Russia and Asia Minor, Lebanon, Iran and the Kopet Dagh mountains.

The wingspan is 15–19 millimetres (0.59–0.75 in). Adults are on wing in March and from June to July.

The larvae feed on Eryngium campestre. Larvae can be found from August to May.

== Subspecies ==
- Aethes flagellana flagellana
- Aethes flagellana atlasi Razowski, 1962
- Aethes flagellana sardoa (Amsel, in Hartig & Amsel, 1952) (Sardinia)
