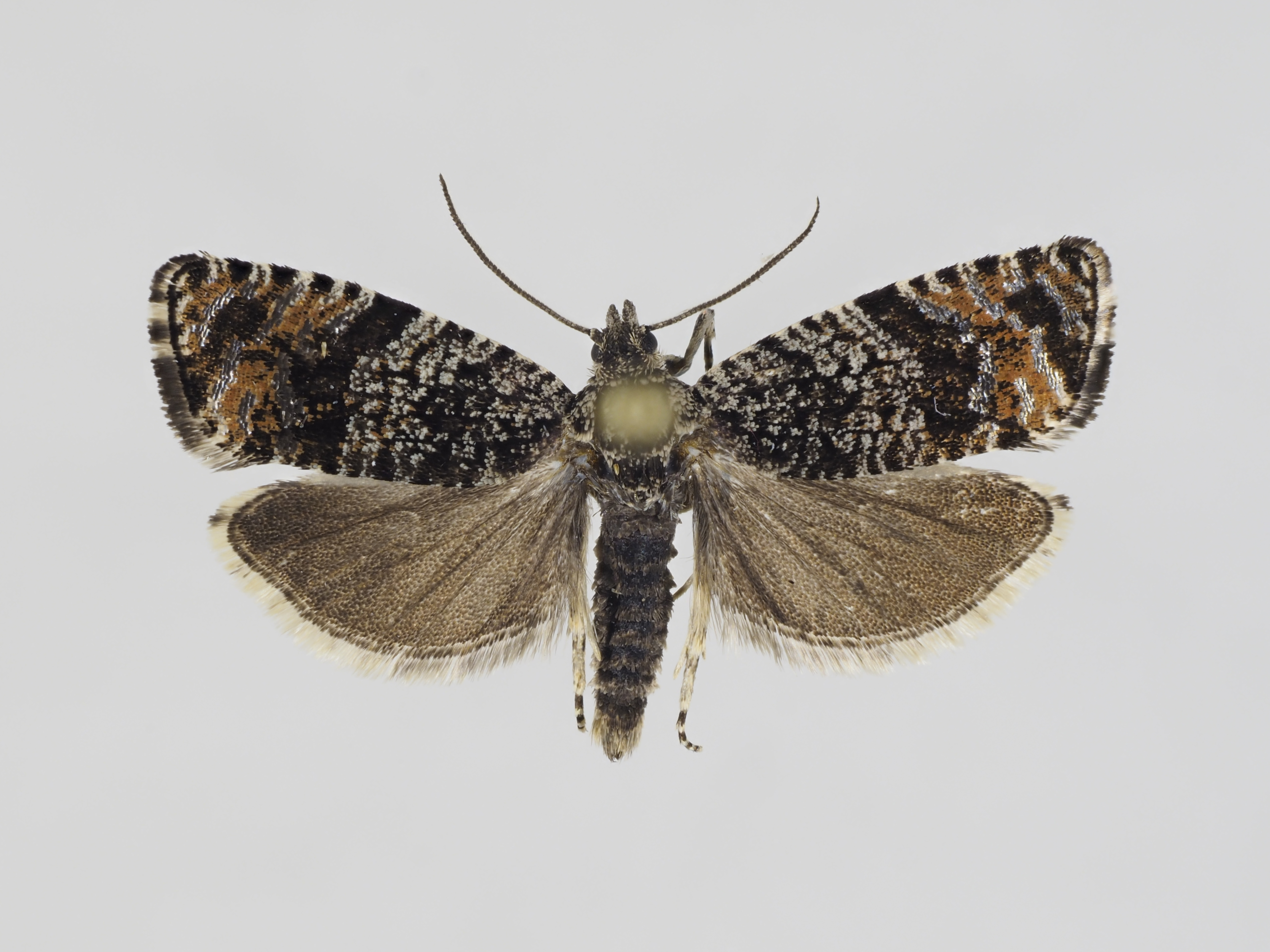

Scientific classification
- Kingdom: Animalia
- Phylum: Arthropoda
- Clade: Pancrustacea
- Class: Insecta
- Order: Lepidoptera
- Family: Tortricidae
- Genus: Argyroploce
- Species: A. concretana

Binomial name
- Argyroploce concretana (Wocke, 1862)

= Argyroploce concretana =

Species of moth

Argyroploce concretana, commonly known as the concrete blotch moth, is a species of moth belonging to the family Tortricidae.

It is native to Europe and Northwestern America.
