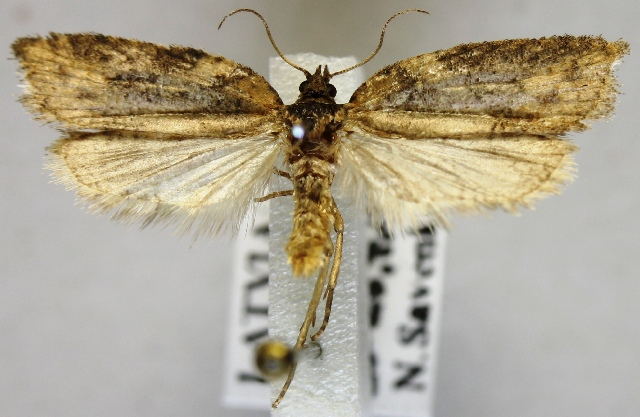

Scientific classification
- Domain: Eukaryota
- Kingdom: Animalia
- Phylum: Arthropoda
- Class: Insecta
- Order: Lepidoptera
- Family: Tortricidae
- Genus: Acleris
- Species: A. scabrana

Binomial name
- Acleris scabrana (Denis & Schiffermuller, 1775)

Synonyms
- Tortrix scabrana Denis & Schiffermuller, 1775; Pyralis elevana Fabricius, 1787; Acalla scabrana ab. griseus Hauder, 1913; Tortrix insulana Krulikowsky, 1903; Acalla scabrana ab. nigrobasis Hauder, 1913; Acalla scabrana f. pernix Muller-Rutz, 1924; Tortrix scabrana ab. pseudocoronana Obraztsov, 1956; Tortrix psorana Frolich, 1828; Acleris scabrana ab. radiana Obraztsov, 1956; Acleris scabrana ab. striana Obraztsov, 1956

= Acleris scabrana =

Species of moth

Acleris scabrana, the gray rough-wing moth, is a species of moth of the family Tortricidae. It is found in Europe, where it has been recorded from France, Belgium, the Netherlands, Germany, Austria, Switzerland, the Czech Republic, Slovakia, Poland, Hungary, Romania, Finland, Latvia, Lithuania, Ukraine and Russia. It is also found in Kazakhstan, Tian Shan, Yakutia, Asia Minor and North America, where it has been recorded from Alberta and British Columbia to California.

The wingspan is 18–24 mm. Adults are on wing from October to April.

The larvae feed on Salix and Populus species. Larvae can be found in August.
