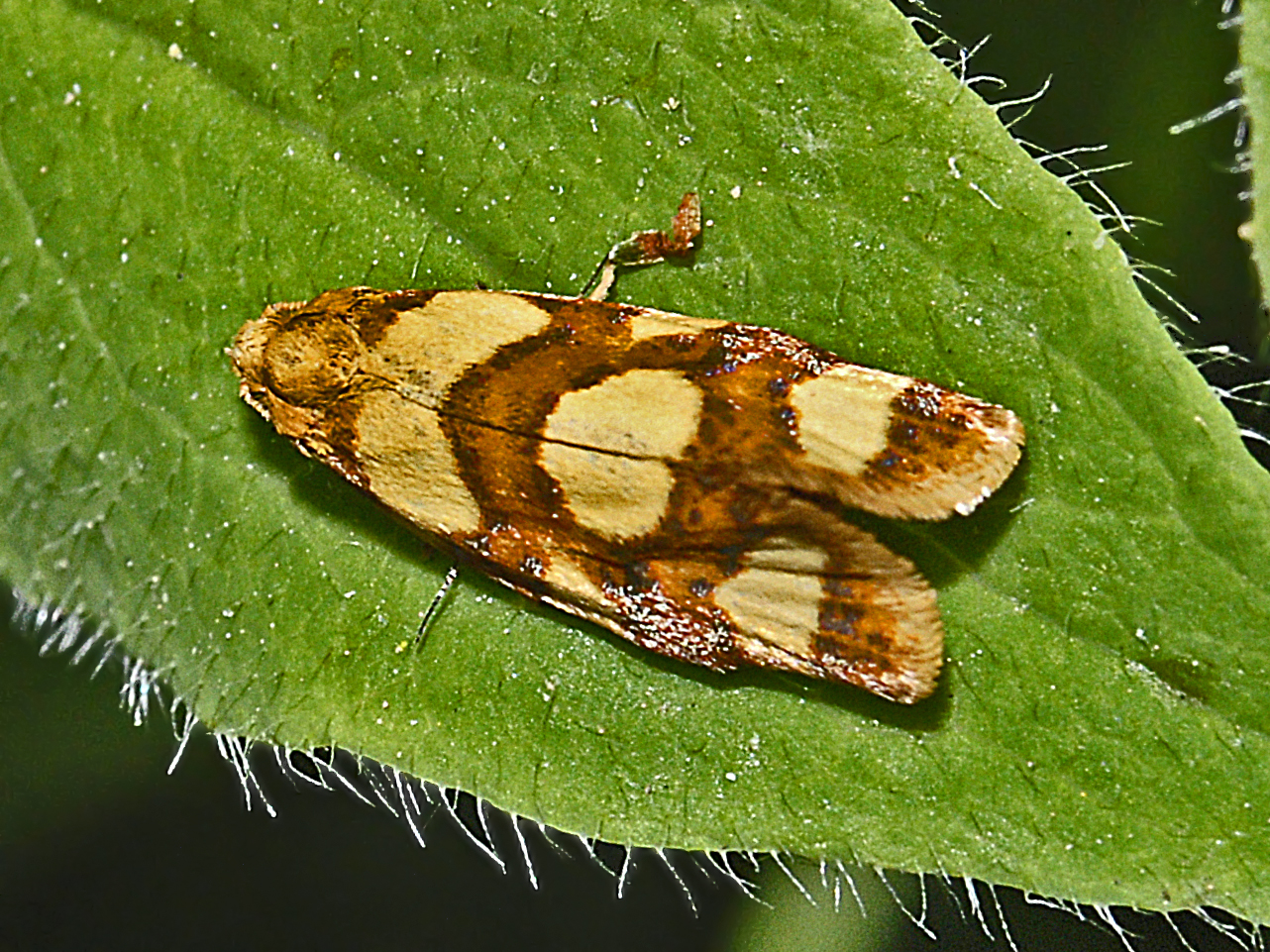

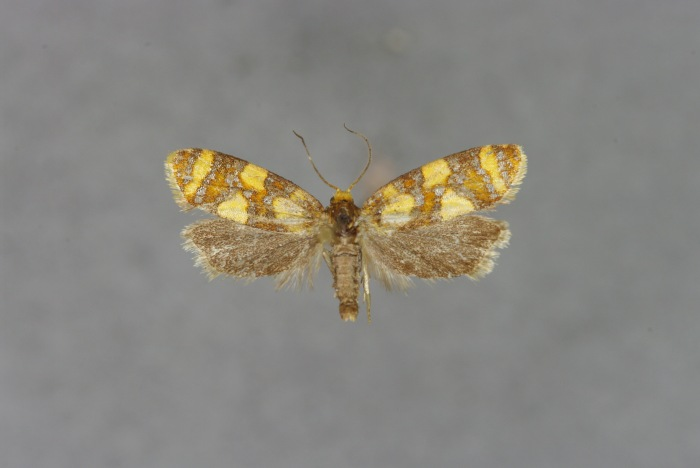
- Mounted specimen

Scientific classification
- Domain: Eukaryota
- Kingdom: Animalia
- Phylum: Arthropoda
- Class: Insecta
- Order: Lepidoptera
- Family: Tortricidae
- Genus: Aethes
- Species: A. decimana

Binomial name
- Aethes decimana ([Denis & Schiffermüller], 1775)

Synonyms
- Tortrix decimana [Denis & Schiffermüller], 1775

= Aethes decimana =

Species of moth

Aethes decimana is a species of moth of the family Tortricidae. It was described by Michael Denis and Ignaz Schiffermüller in 1775.

== Distribution ==
This species can be found in Spain, France, Germany, Italy, Austria, Switzerland, Slovakia, Slovenia, Poland, Romania and Ukraine.

== Habitat ==
This species prefers steep, cool-moist shady mountain forests at 1,350–1,400 metres (4,430–4,590 ft).

== Description ==
Aethes decimana has a wingspan of 17–19 millimetres (0.67–0.75 in). Adults are on wing from July to August.
