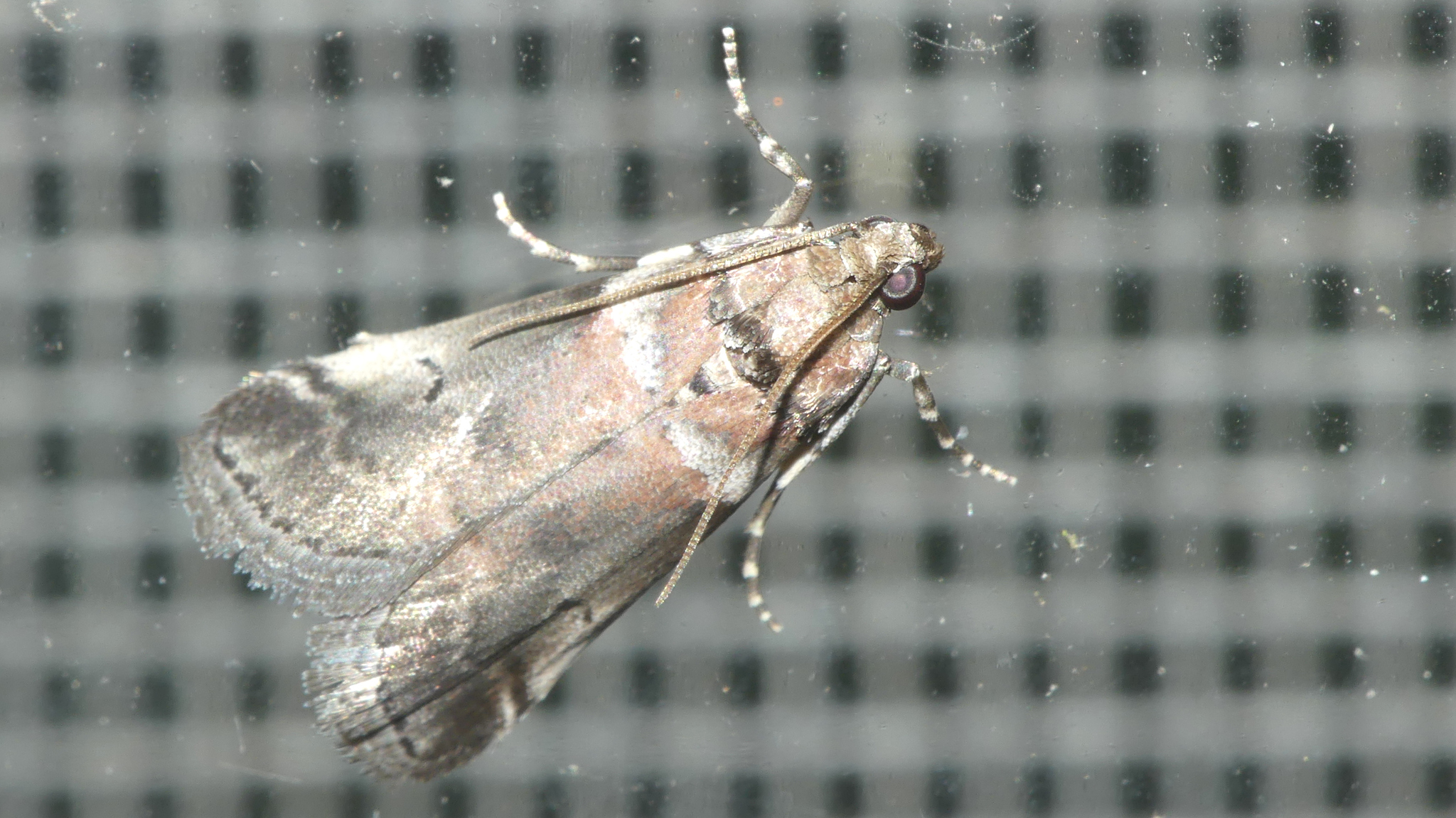

Scientific classification
- Kingdom: Animalia
- Phylum: Arthropoda
- Clade: Pancrustacea
- Class: Insecta
- Order: Lepidoptera
- Family: Pyralidae
- Genus: Acrobasis
- Species: A. legatea

Binomial name
- Acrobasis legatea (Haworth, 1811)

Synonyms
- Phycis legatea Haworth, 1811; Trachycera legatea; Tinea legatella Hübner, 1796; Rhodophaea legatea naumanni Roesler, 1969; Zophodia legatalis Hübner, 1825

= Acrobasis legatea =

Species of moth

Acrobasis legatea is a species of snout moth in the genus Acrobasis. It was described by Adrian Hardy Haworth in 1811. It is found in most of Europe, except the north, east to Russia and Kazakhstan.

The wingspan is 19–25 mm. Adults are on wing from mid-June to the beginning of September in one generation per year.

The larvae feed on Rhamnus catharticus and Frangula alnus.
