= Cydia falsifalcellum =

Scientific classification
- Kingdom: Animalia
- Phylum: Arthropoda
- Class: Insecta
- Order: Lepidoptera
- Family: Tortricidae
- Genus: Cydia
- Species: C. falsifalcellum

Binomial name
- Cydia falsifalcellum (Walsingham, 1907)

Synonyms
- Adenoneura falsifalcellum Walsingham, 1907; Cydia falsifalcella – Zimmerman, 1978

Species of moth

Cydia falsifalcellum is a moth of the family Tortricidae. It was described by Lord Walsingham in 1907. It is endemic to the island of Hawaii. It is similar to Cydia parapteryx from Oahu and might even be conspecific. It is rare due to a lack of host plants.

The larvae feed on Canavalia and Vicia, possibly Vicia menziesii, and possibly on Strogylodon ruber. They feed on the seeds and stems and possibly the flowers of their host plant.
