= Cydia crassicornis =

Scientific classification
- Kingdom: Animalia
- Phylum: Arthropoda
- Class: Insecta
- Order: Lepidoptera
- Family: Tortricidae
- Genus: Cydia
- Species: C. crassicornis

Binomial name
- Cydia crassicornis (Walsingham, 1907)

Synonyms
- Enarmonia crassicornis Walsingham, 1907

Species of moth

Cydia crassicornis is a moth of the family Tortricidae. It was described by Lord Walsingham in 1907. It is endemic to the island of Hawaii.

Cydia crassicornis is similar to Cydia walsinghamii and might even be conspecific. It is known from two males collected in 1892 at 1,200 m (4,000 ft) altitude near Kona. It is presumed extinct. The larvae possibly used Acacia koa as the host.
