= Cydia aelina =

Scientific classification
- Domain: Eukaryota
- Kingdom: Animalia
- Phylum: Arthropoda
- Class: Insecta
- Order: Lepidoptera
- Family: Tortricidae
- Genus: Cydia
- Species: C. aelina

Binomial name
- Cydia aelina Diakonoff, 1982

Species of moth

Cydia aelina is a moth of the family Tortricidae first described by Alexey Diakonoff in 1982. It is found in Sri Lanka.

The specific name aelina is derived from Greek and means "mournful".

== Description ==
Males have a wingspan of 10 mm (0.39 in). The head of the moth is brownish grey with black dusting. The brownish-grey to black antennae are moderately thickened and covered with fine hairs. The labial pedipalps are slender. The thorax is brownish grey to black with pale ochre dusting. The abdomen is blackish. The brownish-grey to black forewings are oblong, moderately broad, and dilated. The costal area of the forewing is curved and covered with pale oblique lines. The apex is rectangular. The posterior third of the forewing is less densely dusted than the rest of the forewing, with a blackish gloss. The anterior apical edge is jet black. This dark apical area contains a close pair of large wedge-shaped and snow-white transverse marks before the apex. The white cilia are brownish grey with a darker grey basal line. The hindwings are dark bronze to brownish grey.
