= Cydia zebeana =

Larch bark moth

Scientific classification
- Kingdom: Animalia
- Phylum: Arthropoda
- Class: Insecta
- Order: Lepidoptera
- Family: Tortricidae
- Genus: Cydia
- Species: C. zebeana

Binomial name
- Cydia zebeana (Ratzeburg, 1840)

Synonyms
- Tortrix zebeana Ratzeburg, 1840; Laspeyresia sanctacruciana Karpinski & Toll, in Toll & Karpinski, 1962

Species of moth

Cydia zebeana, the larch bark moth, is a moth of the family Tortricidae. It is found in central and eastern Europe, Siberia and China. It is also known from the Netherlands.

This species is often confused with Cydia millenniana.

The wingspan is 14–18 mm. Adults are on wing in May and June. The larva takes two years to develop.

The larvae feed on Larix species. The larvae tunnel under the bark of their host plant.
