= Cydia chlorostola =

Scientific classification
- Kingdom: Animalia
- Phylum: Arthropoda
- Class: Insecta
- Order: Lepidoptera
- Family: Tortricidae
- Genus: Cydia
- Species: C. chlorostola

Binomial name
- Cydia chlorostola (Meyrick, 1932)

Synonyms
- Laspeyresia chlorostola Meyrick, 1932

Species of moth

Cydia chlorostola is a moth of the family Tortricidae. It was described by Edward Meyrick in 1932. It is endemic to the Hawaiian island of Oahu.

Cydia chlorostola is known from a single female presumably collected near Waialua – although this might be the locality where the specimen was mailed from, with its true origin elsewhere in the Hawaiian Islands. It is presumed extinct. It is similar to Cydia parapteryx. The larvae possibly used Canavalia as the host.
