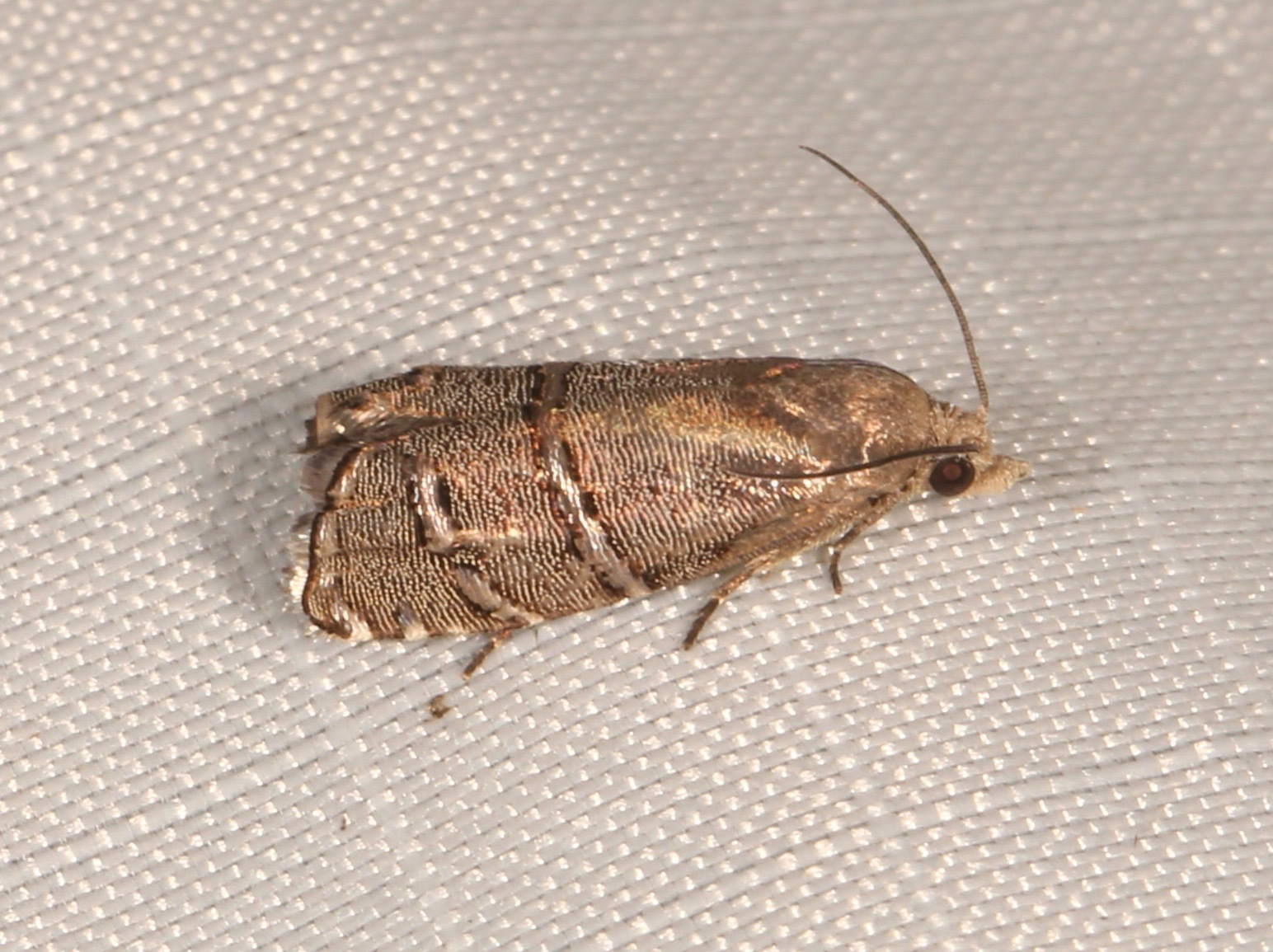
- Live adult C. ingens photographed in Franklin County, Florida
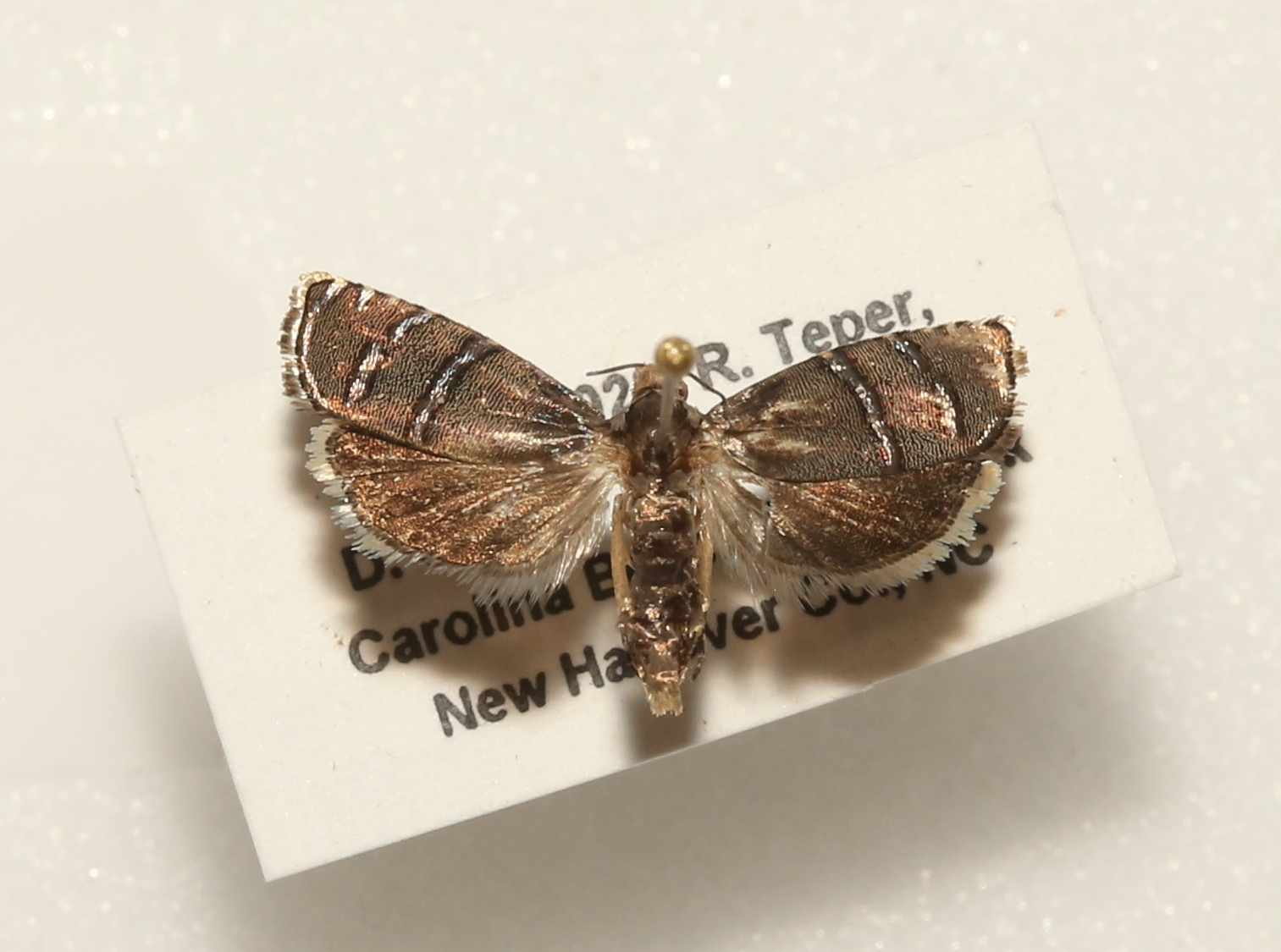
- Adult C. ingens specimen collected in New Hanover County, North Carolina

Scientific classification
- Kingdom: Animalia
- Phylum: Arthropoda
- Class: Insecta
- Order: Lepidoptera
- Family: Tortricidae
- Genus: Cydia
- Species: C. ingens

Binomial name
- Cydia ingens (Heinrich, 1926)

Synonyms
- Laspeyresia ingens Heinrich, 1926

= Cydia ingens =

Longleaf pine seedworm moth

Species of moth

Cydia ingens, commonly known as the longleaf pine seedworm moth, is a species of moth in the family Tortricidae. It is found in southeastern North America. The caterpillars feed on the seeds of longleaf pine (Pinus palustris), slash pine (Pinus elliottii), and loblolly pine (Pinus taeda). It was first described by American entomologist Carl Heinrich in 1926 as Laspeyresia ingens.

== Distribution and habitat ==
Cydia ingens has been recorded in Alabama, Florida, Georgia, Mississippi, North Carolina, and South Carolina, but probably occurs throughout the range of its preferred host plant, Pinus palustris. It can be found in pine forests and coastal plains where its hosts are present.

== Description ==
Adult Cydia ingens moths are grayish-brown, similar in appearance to Cydia toreuta, with a wingspan of approximately 17–20 mm (0.67–0.79 in). The head is a dirty white color. The forewings are ashy-brown with several metallic bars that are edged with black (one of which is usually broken into a dorsal and ventral bar) and a conspicuous black line running along the wingtip, which is fringed with silver. The hindwings are a smoky-fuscous color with a paler fringe. Larvae are whitish and grub-like.
