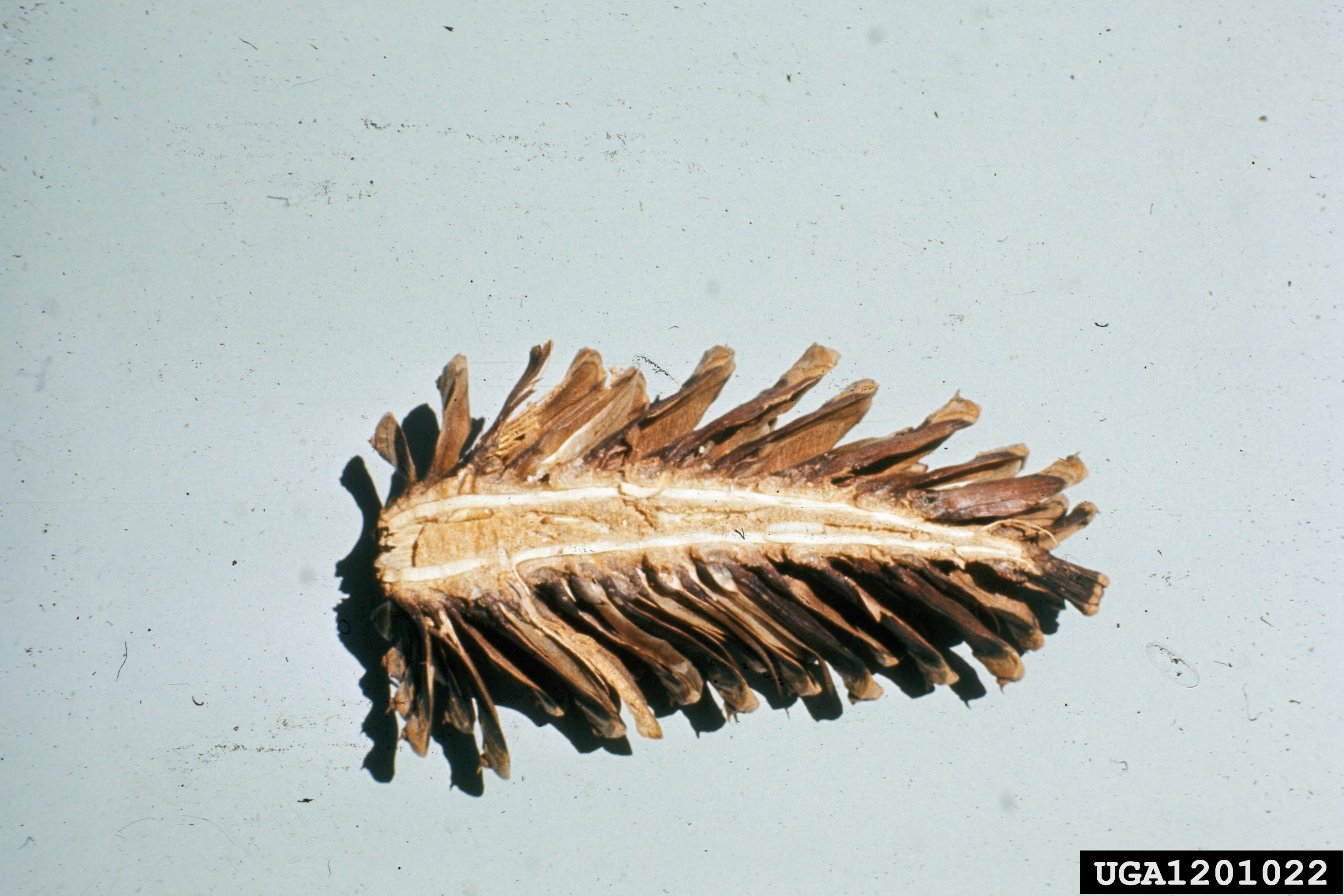
- Caterpillar overwintering in pith of Pinus ponderosa cone

Scientific classification
- Kingdom: Animalia
- Phylum: Arthropoda
- Class: Insecta
- Order: Lepidoptera
- Family: Tortricidae
- Genus: Cydia
- Species: C. piperana

Binomial name
- Cydia piperana Kearfott, 1907

= Cydia piperana =

Ponderosa pine seedworm moth

Species of moth

Cydia piperana, the ponderosa pine seedworm moth, is a moth of the family Tortricidae. It is found in southwestern North America.

The wingspan is about 19 mm.

The larvae feed on the seeds of Pinus ponderosa and Pinus jefferyi.
