= Cydia rufipennis =

Scientific classification
- Kingdom: Animalia
- Phylum: Arthropoda
- Class: Insecta
- Order: Lepidoptera
- Family: Tortricidae
- Genus: Cydia
- Species: C. rufipennis

Binomial name
- Cydia rufipennis (Butler, 1881)

Synonyms
- Phoxopteris rufipennis Butler, 1881; Adenoneura rufipennis

Species of moth

Cydia rufipennis is a moth of the family Tortricidae. It was first described by Arthur Gardiner Butler in 1881. It is endemic to the Hawaiian islands of Kauai, Oahu and Maui.

The larvae feed on the flowers and seeds of Acacia koa.
