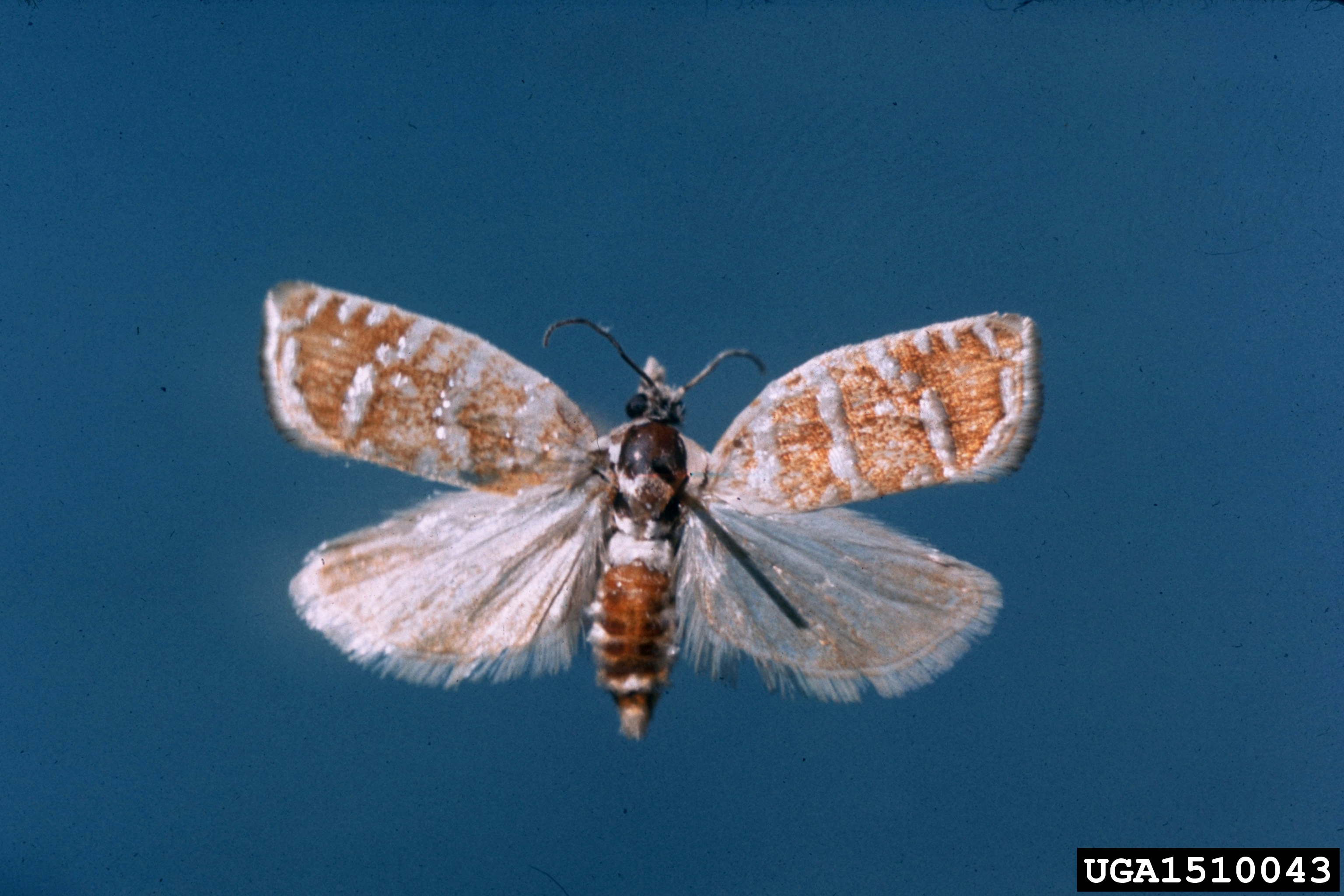

Scientific classification
- Kingdom: Animalia
- Phylum: Arthropoda
- Clade: Pancrustacea
- Class: Insecta
- Order: Lepidoptera
- Family: Tortricidae
- Genus: Cydia
- Species: C. anaranjada

Binomial name
- Cydia anaranjada (Miller, 1959)

Synonyms
- Laspeyresia anaranjada

= Cydia anaranjada =

Slash pine seedworm moth

Species of moth

Cydia anaranjada, the slash pine seedworm, is a moth of the family Tortricidae. It is found on the Gulf Coast.
