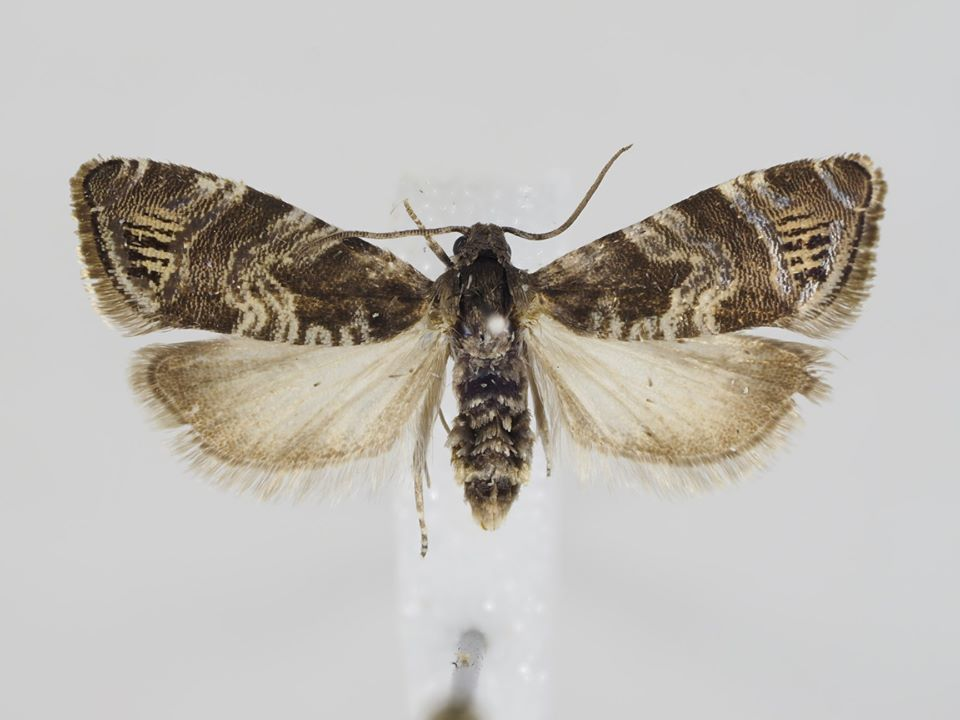

Scientific classification
- Kingdom: Animalia
- Phylum: Arthropoda
- Clade: Pancrustacea
- Class: Insecta
- Order: Lepidoptera
- Family: Tortricidae
- Genus: Cydia
- Species: C. corollana

Binomial name
- Cydia corollana (Hübner, 1822-1823)

= Cydia corollana =

Species of moth

Cydia corollana is a moth belonging to the family Tortricidae. The species was first described by Jacob Hübner in 1822–1823.
