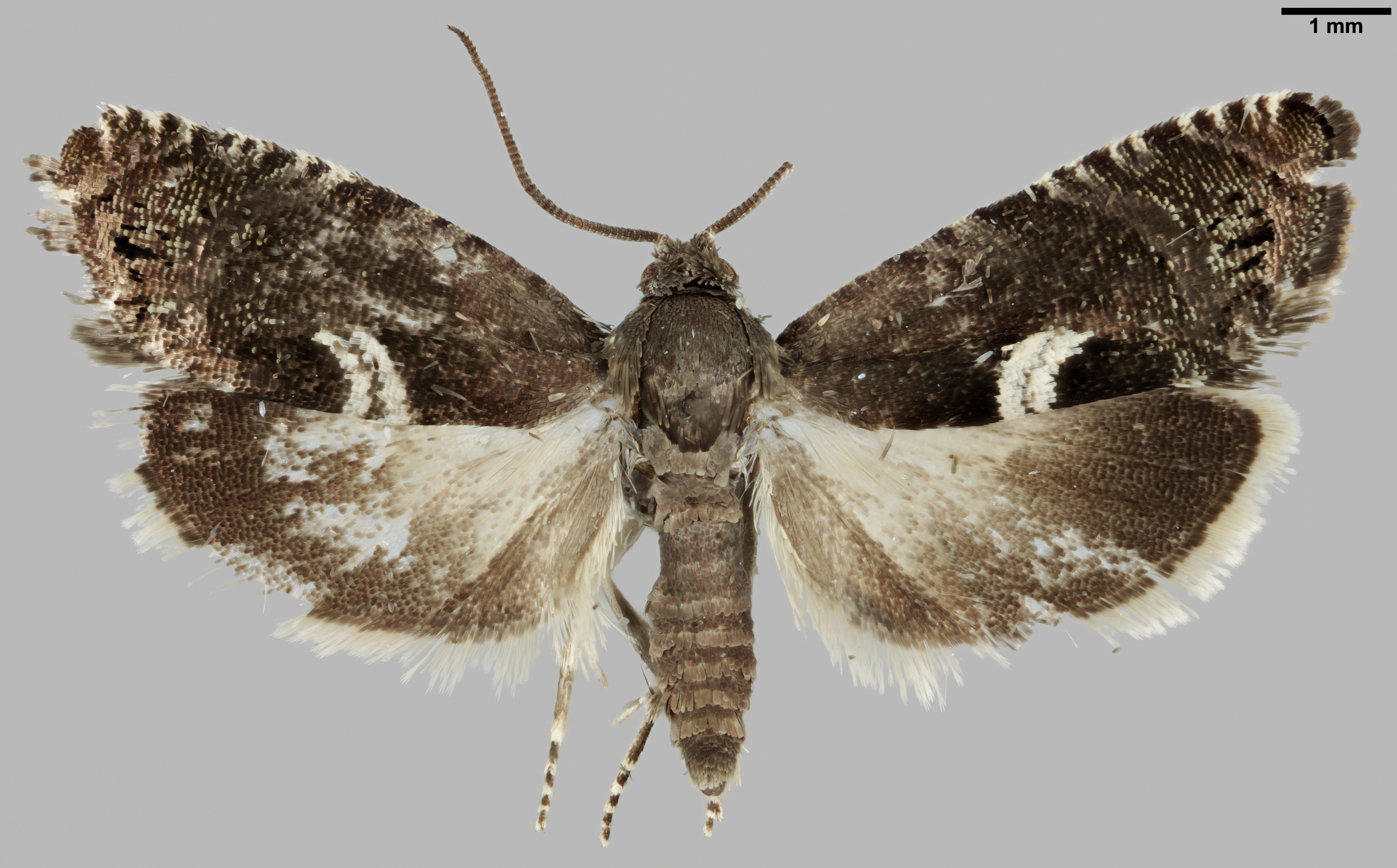

Scientific classification
- Kingdom: Animalia
- Phylum: Arthropoda
- Clade: Pancrustacea
- Class: Insecta
- Order: Lepidoptera
- Family: Tortricidae
- Genus: Cydia
- Species: C. leguminana

Binomial name
- Cydia leguminana (Lienig & Zeller, 1846)

= Cydia leguminana =

Species of moth

Cydia leguminana is a moth belonging to the family Tortricidae. The species was first described by Friederike Lienig and Philipp Christoph Zeller in 1846.

It is native to Europe.
