= Cydia honorana =

Scientific classification
- Kingdom: Animalia
- Phylum: Arthropoda
- Class: Insecta
- Order: Lepidoptera
- Family: Tortricidae
- Genus: Cydia
- Species: C. honorana

Binomial name
- Cydia honorana (Herrich-Schäffer, 1851)

Synonyms
- Grapholitha honorana Herrich-Schäffer, 1851

Species of moth

Cydia honorana is a species of moth belonging to the family Tortricidae first described by Gottlieb August Wilhelm Herrich-Schäffer in 1851.
