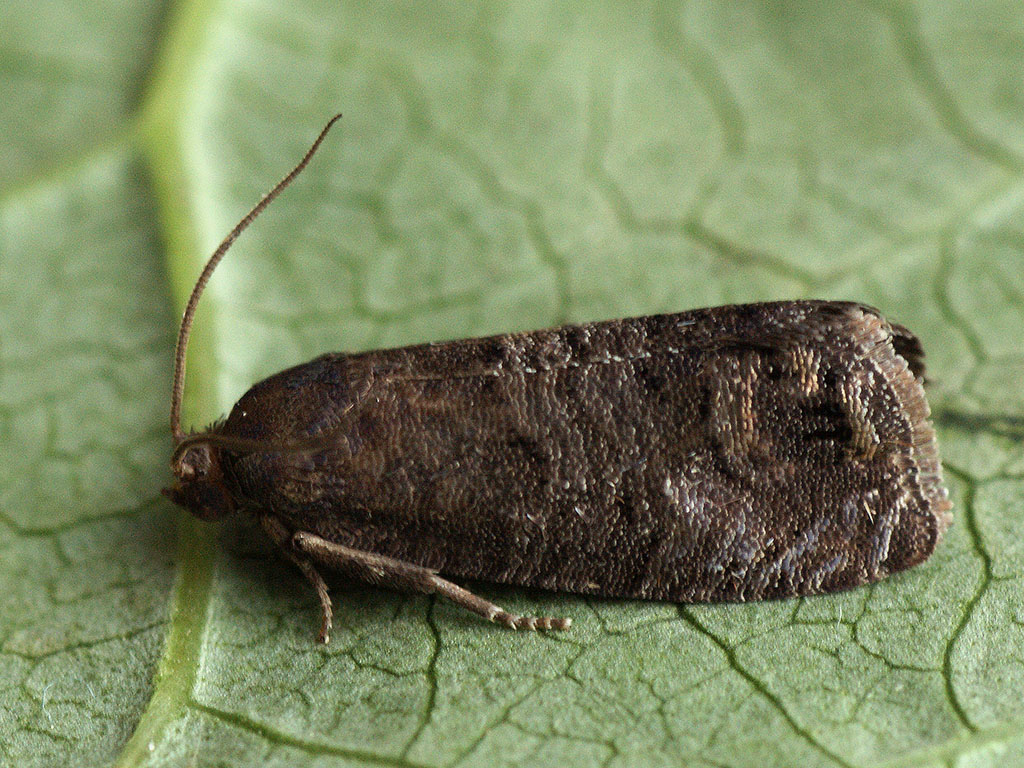

Scientific classification
- Kingdom: Animalia
- Phylum: Arthropoda
- Class: Insecta
- Order: Lepidoptera
- Family: Tortricidae
- Genus: Cydia
- Species: C. pyrivora

Binomial name
- Cydia pyrivora (Danilevsky, 1947)

Synonyms
- Carpocapsa pyrivora Danilevsky, 1947; Laspeyresia dannehli Obraztsov, 1950

= Cydia pyrivora =

Species of moth

Cydia pyrivora, the pear fruit moth or pear tortricid, is a moth of the family Tortricidae. It is found in Latvia, the Czech Republic, Slovakia, Sardinia, Sicily, the Italian mainland, Austria, Hungary, Yugoslavia, Romania, Bulgaria, Algeria, the island of Crete in Greece, Ukraine and southern and central Russia.

The wingspan is 17–22 mm. Adults are on wing in the second half of June in Austria and from May to June in Russia. There is one generation per year.

The larvae feed on Pyrus species.
