= Cydia adenocarpi =

Scientific classification
- Kingdom: Animalia
- Phylum: Arthropoda
- Class: Insecta
- Order: Lepidoptera
- Family: Tortricidae
- Genus: Cydia
- Species: C. adenocarpi

Binomial name
- Cydia adenocarpi (Ragonot, 1875)

Species of moth

Cydia adenocarpi is a species of moth belonging to the family Tortricidae.

Synonym:

- Grapholitha adenocarpi Ragonot, 1875 (= basionym)
