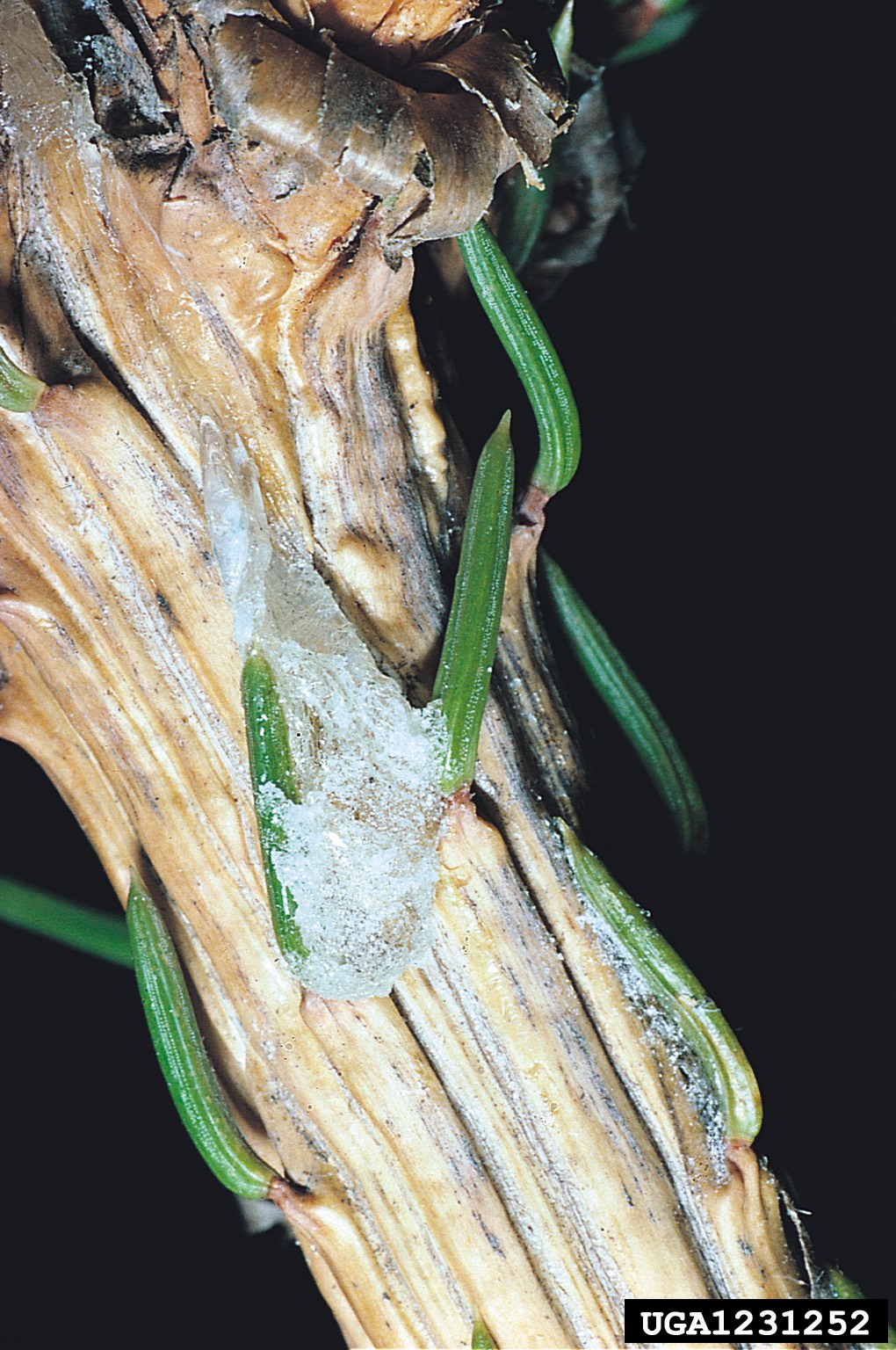

Scientific classification
- Kingdom: Animalia
- Phylum: Arthropoda
- Clade: Pancrustacea
- Class: Insecta
- Order: Lepidoptera
- Family: Tortricidae
- Genus: Cydia
- Species: C. pactolana

Binomial name
- Cydia pactolana (Zeller, 1840)

Synonyms
- Tortrix pactolana Zeller, 1840; Coccyx pinetana Schläger, 1848; Laspeyresia yasudai Oku, 1968

= Cydia pactolana =

Spruce bark tortrix

Species of moth

Cydia pactolana, the spruce bark tortrix, is a moth of the family Tortricidae. It is found in central, northern and eastern Europe as well as Siberia. In Japan, the subspecies Cydia pactolana yasudai is present.

The wingspan is 13–14 mm. Adults are on wing from May to June in one generation depending on the location.

The larvae feed on Picea abies, Picea pungens, Picea sitchensis and Larix species. Cydia pactolana yasudai feeds on Abies sachalinensis.

In Finland, spruce bark tortrix was found to cause damage to Picea abies in association with the fungal pathogen Neonectria fuckeliana.

== Subspecies ==
- Cydia pactolana pactolana
- Cydia pactolana yasudai (Japan)
