= Cydia latifemoris =

Scientific classification
- Kingdom: Animalia
- Phylum: Arthropoda
- Class: Insecta
- Order: Lepidoptera
- Family: Tortricidae
- Genus: Cydia
- Species: C. latifemoris

Binomial name
- Cydia latifemoris (Walsingham, 1907)

Synonyms
- Adenoneura latifemoris Walsingham, 1907

Species of moth

Cydia latifemoris is a moth of the family Tortricidae. It was described by Lord Walsingham in 1907. It is endemic to the Hawaiian islands of Maui and, possibly, Hawaii. While it is locally common on Maui, only the male paratype is known from Hawaii. Whether the latter record is reliable is an open question.

The larvae feed on Sophora chrysophylla, preying heavily on their seeds and possibly also terminal twigs.
