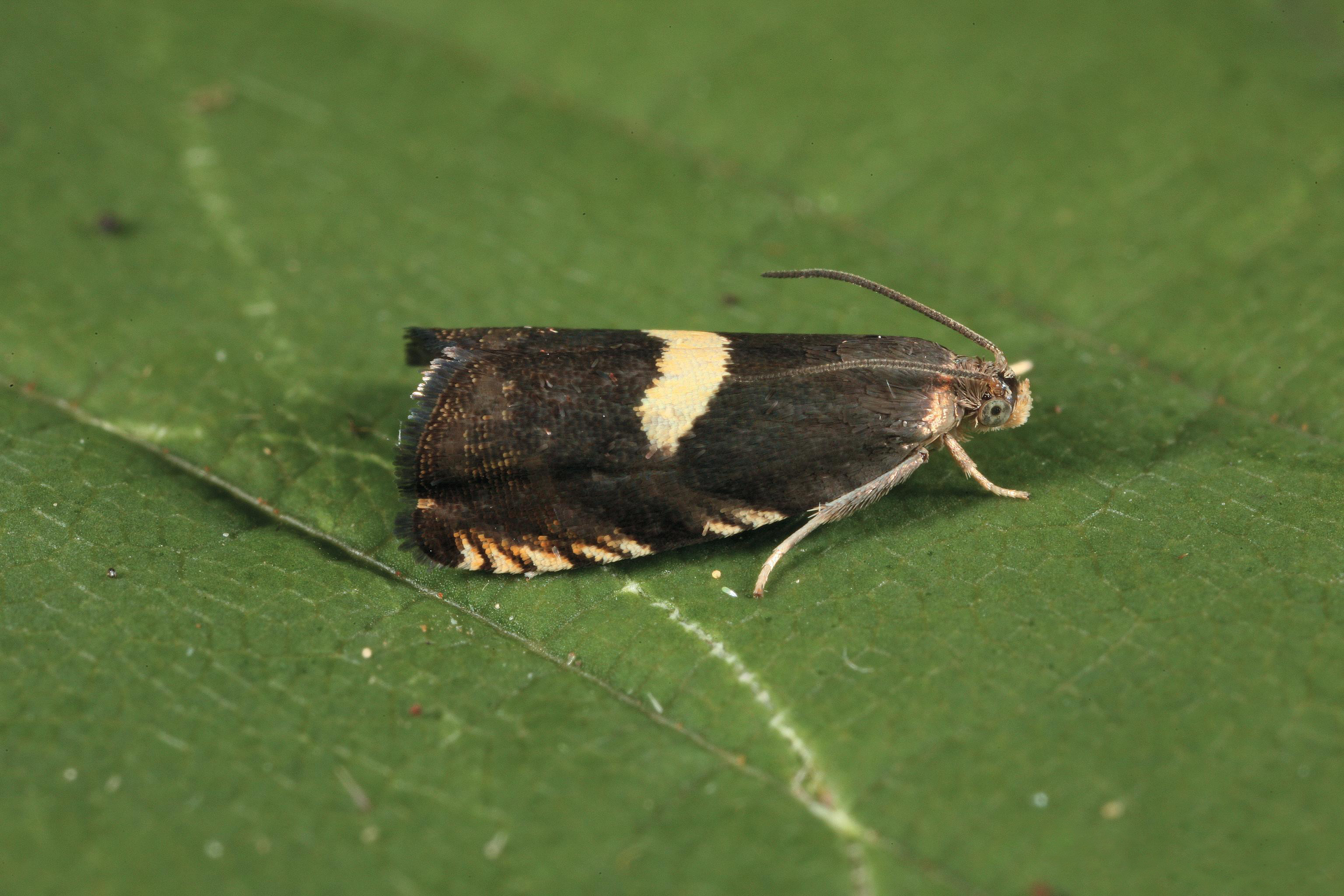

Scientific classification
- Kingdom: Animalia
- Phylum: Arthropoda
- Clade: Pancrustacea
- Class: Insecta
- Order: Lepidoptera
- Family: Tortricidae
- Genus: Cydia
- Species: C. inquinatana

Binomial name
- Cydia inquinatana (Hübner, 1799)

Synonyms
- Tortrix inquinatana Hübner, [1799]; Hemimene jacquiniana Hübner, [1825]; Grapholitha inquinatana ab. maura Krulikowsky, 1902

= Cydia inquinatana =

Species of moth

Cydia inquinatana is a species of moth of the family Tortricidae. It is found in most of Europe, except Ireland, the Iberian Peninsula and the southern part of the Balkan Peninsula. It has recently turned up in the southeast of Great Britain where it may be breeding.

The wingspan is 11–14 mm. Adults are on wing from May to June in one generation per year.

The larvae feed on Acer campestre and Acer pseudoplatanus. They live in the seeds of their host plant.
