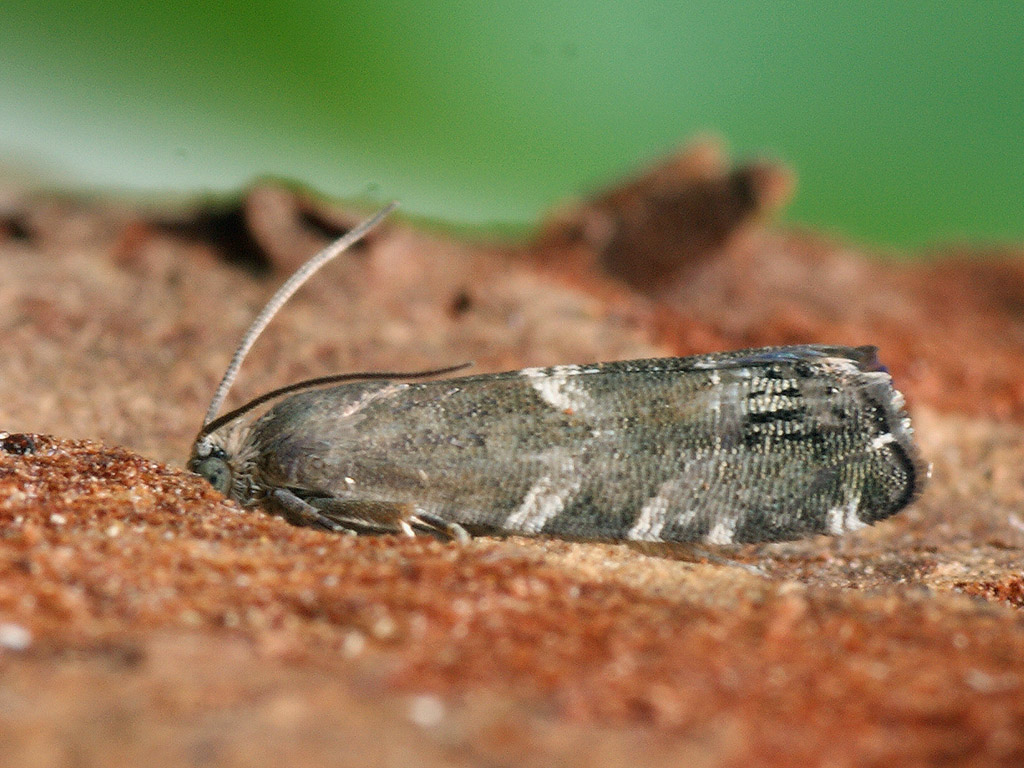
- Cydia coniferana Moscow Oblast

Scientific classification
- Domain: Eukaryota
- Kingdom: Animalia
- Phylum: Arthropoda
- Class: Insecta
- Order: Lepidoptera
- Family: Tortricidae
- Genus: Cydia
- Species: C. coniferana

Binomial name
- Cydia coniferana (Saxesen in Ratzeburg, 1840)

= Cydia coniferana =

Species of moth

Cydia coniferana is a Palearctic moth belonging to the family Tortricidae. The species was first described by Saxesen in 1840. The wingspan is 11–13 mm. The forewings are dark fuscous, the costa posteriorly with white strigulae, some ending in obscure leaden-metallic marks. There is an irregular erect white dorsal median spot, including a dark fuscous strigula. The ocellus is edged with leaden-metallic, and crossed by several black dashes. The hindwings are fuscous. The larva is dull yellowish; head pale brown

It is native to the Palearctic including Europe and it is introduced to Northern America. Cydia coniferana completes 1-2 generations per year in Europe.

The larva lives under the bark of pine Pinus sylvestris, where this has suffered an injury. Their presence is shown by reddish loose bark and exuded frass mixed with resin. The moths fly from May to August.
