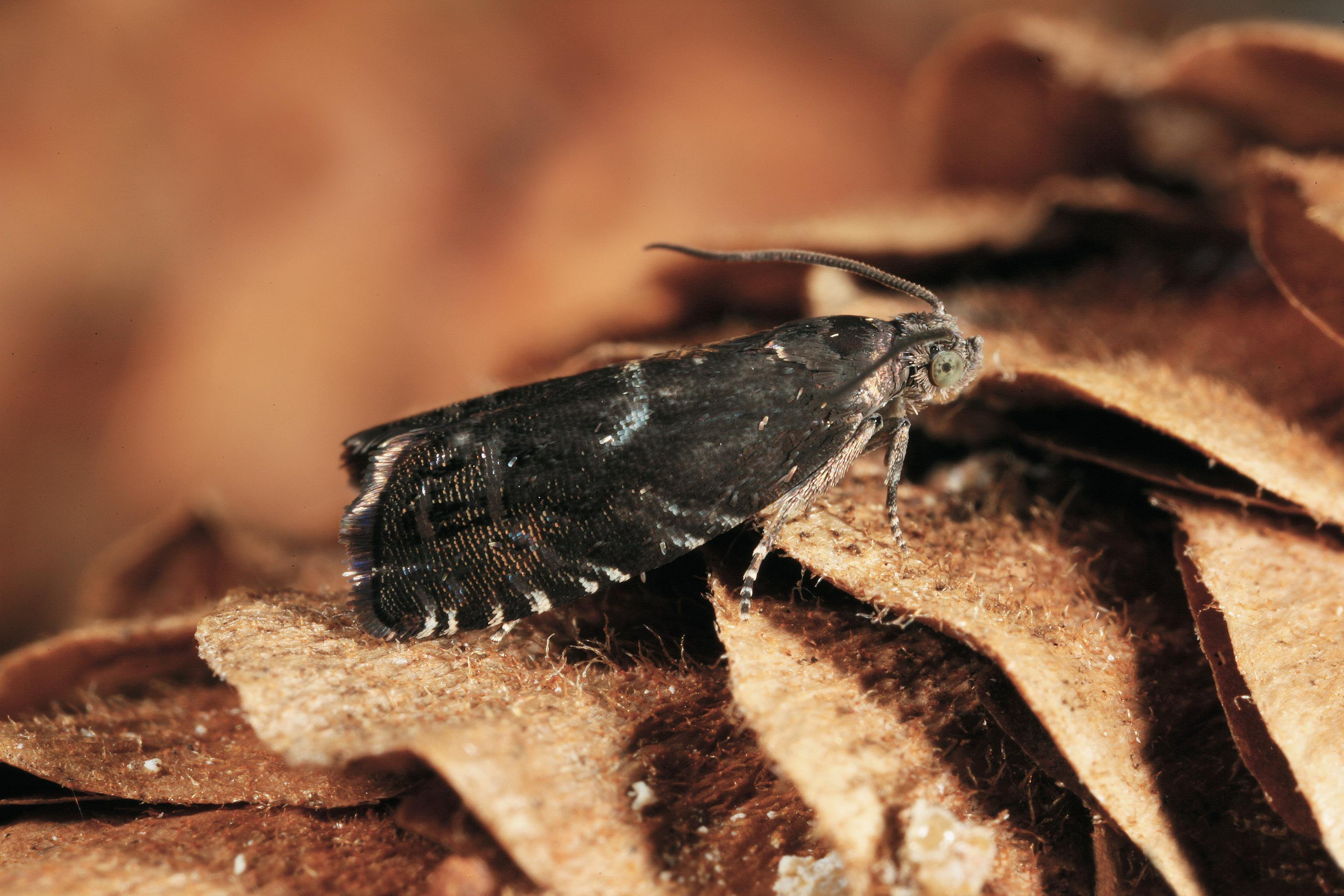

Scientific classification
- Kingdom: Animalia
- Phylum: Arthropoda
- Class: Insecta
- Order: Lepidoptera
- Family: Tortricidae
- Genus: Cydia
- Species: C. indivisa

Binomial name
- Cydia indivisa (Danilevsky, 1963)

Synonyms
- Laspeyresia indivisa Danilevsky, 1963

= Cydia indivisa =

Species of moth

Cydia indivisa is a species of moth of the family Tortricidae. It is found from Fennoscandia to France, Switzerland, Austria and Slovakia. In the east, the range extends to the Baltic region and northern Russia.

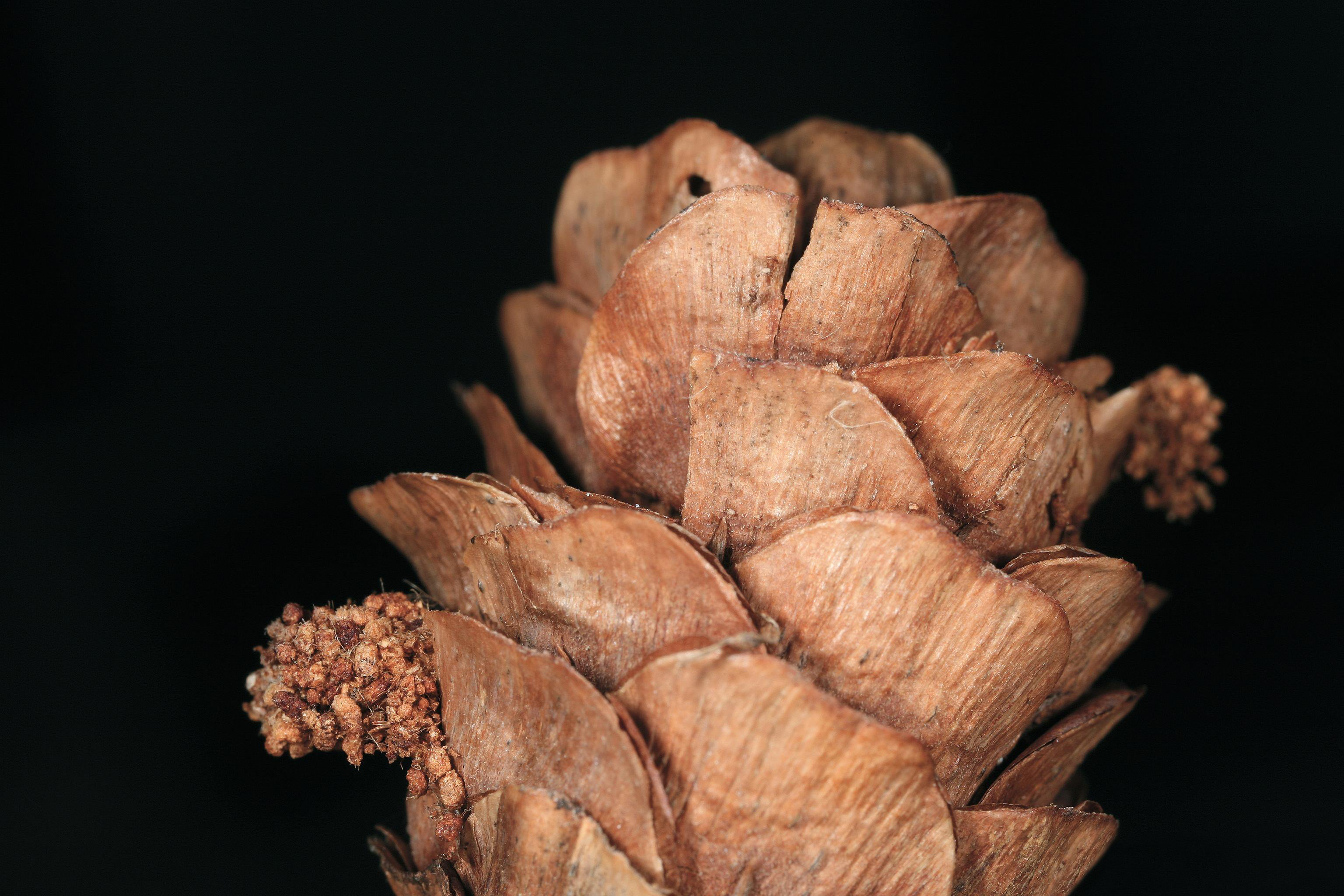
Damage

The wingspan is 13–16 mm. Adults are on wing from May to July in one generation per year.

The larvae feed on Picea abies. They feed under the bark of their host plant.
