= Cydia conspicua =

Scientific classification
- Kingdom: Animalia
- Phylum: Arthropoda
- Class: Insecta
- Order: Lepidoptera
- Family: Tortricidae
- Genus: Cydia
- Species: C. conspicua

Binomial name
- Cydia conspicua (Walsingham, 1907)

Synonyms
- Enarmonia conspicua; Adenoneura conspicua

Species of moth

Cydia conspicua is a moth of the family Tortricidae. It is endemic to the Hawaiian islands of Oahu and Maui.

The larvae feed on Acacia koa. They have been found on dead bark and seeds of their host plant.
