= Cydia grunertiana =

Scientific classification
- Domain: Eukaryota
- Kingdom: Animalia
- Phylum: Arthropoda
- Class: Insecta
- Order: Lepidoptera
- Family: Tortricidae
- Genus: Cydia
- Species: C. grunertiana

Binomial name
- Cydia grunertiana (Ratzeburg, 1868)

Species of moth

Cydia grunertiana is a species of moth belonging to the family Tortricidae.

It is native to Western Europe.
