= Cydia oxytropidis =

Scientific classification
- Kingdom: Animalia
- Phylum: Arthropoda
- Class: Insecta
- Order: Lepidoptera
- Family: Tortricidae
- Genus: Cydia
- Species: C. oxytropidis

Binomial name
- Cydia oxytropidis (Martini, 1912)

Species of moth

Cydia oxytropidis is a species of moth belonging to the family Tortricidae.

Synonym:

- Grapholitha oxytropidis Martini, 1912
