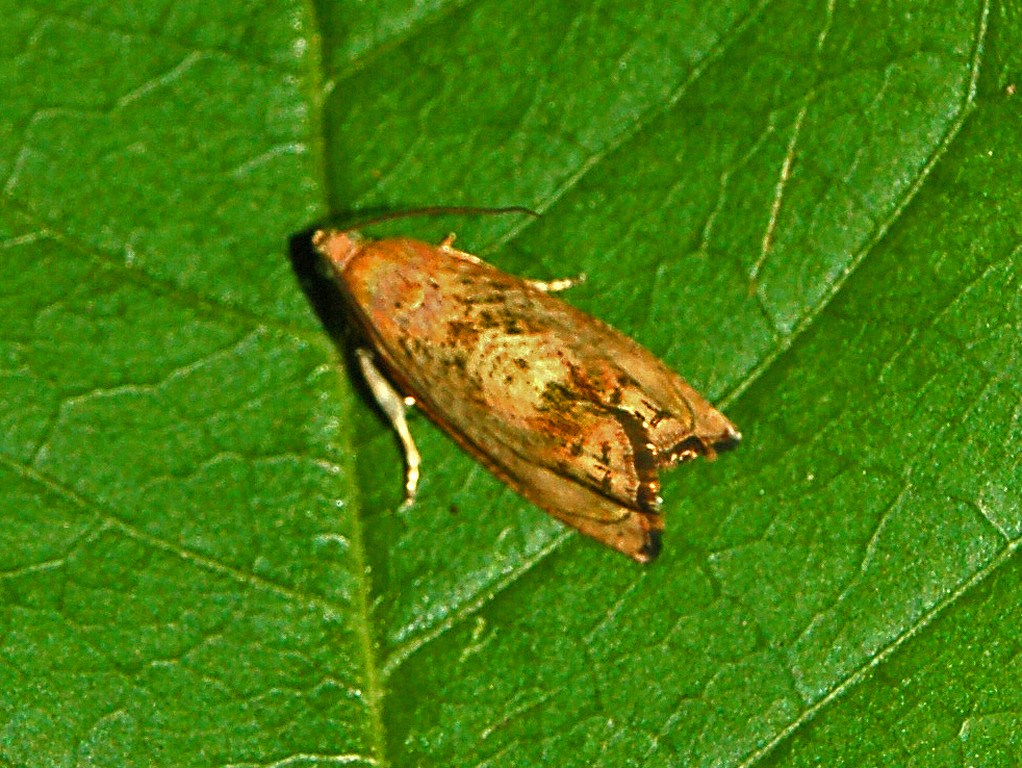

Scientific classification
- Kingdom: Animalia
- Phylum: Arthropoda
- Class: Insecta
- Order: Lepidoptera
- Family: Tortricidae
- Genus: Cydia
- Species: C. amplana

Binomial name
- Cydia amplana (Hübner, [1799])

Synonyms
- Tortrix amplana Hubner, [1796-1799]; Carpocapsa molybdana Constant, 1884

= Cydia amplana =

Rusty oak moth

Species of moth

Cydia amplana, the rusty oak moth, is a moth of the family Tortricidae. It is found from northern, central and southern Europe to Asia Minor, south-western Russia and Transcaucasus.

The wingspan is 16–20 mm. It often needs two years for development.

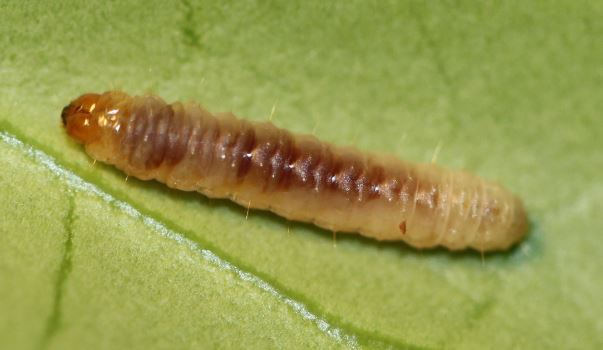

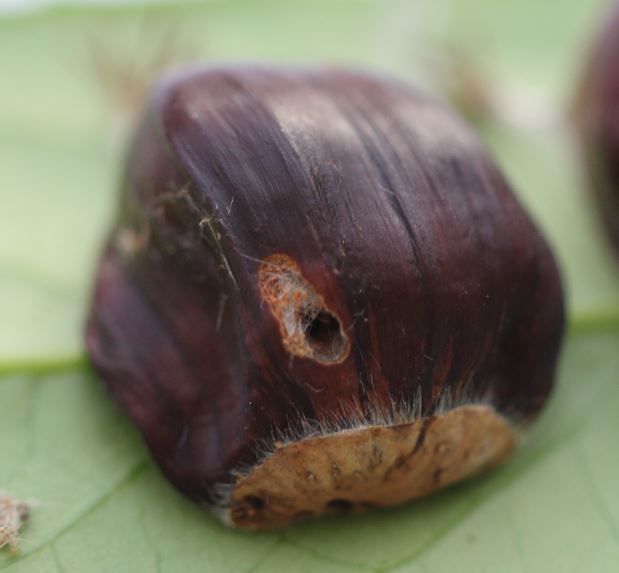
Larval exit hole in sweet chestnut

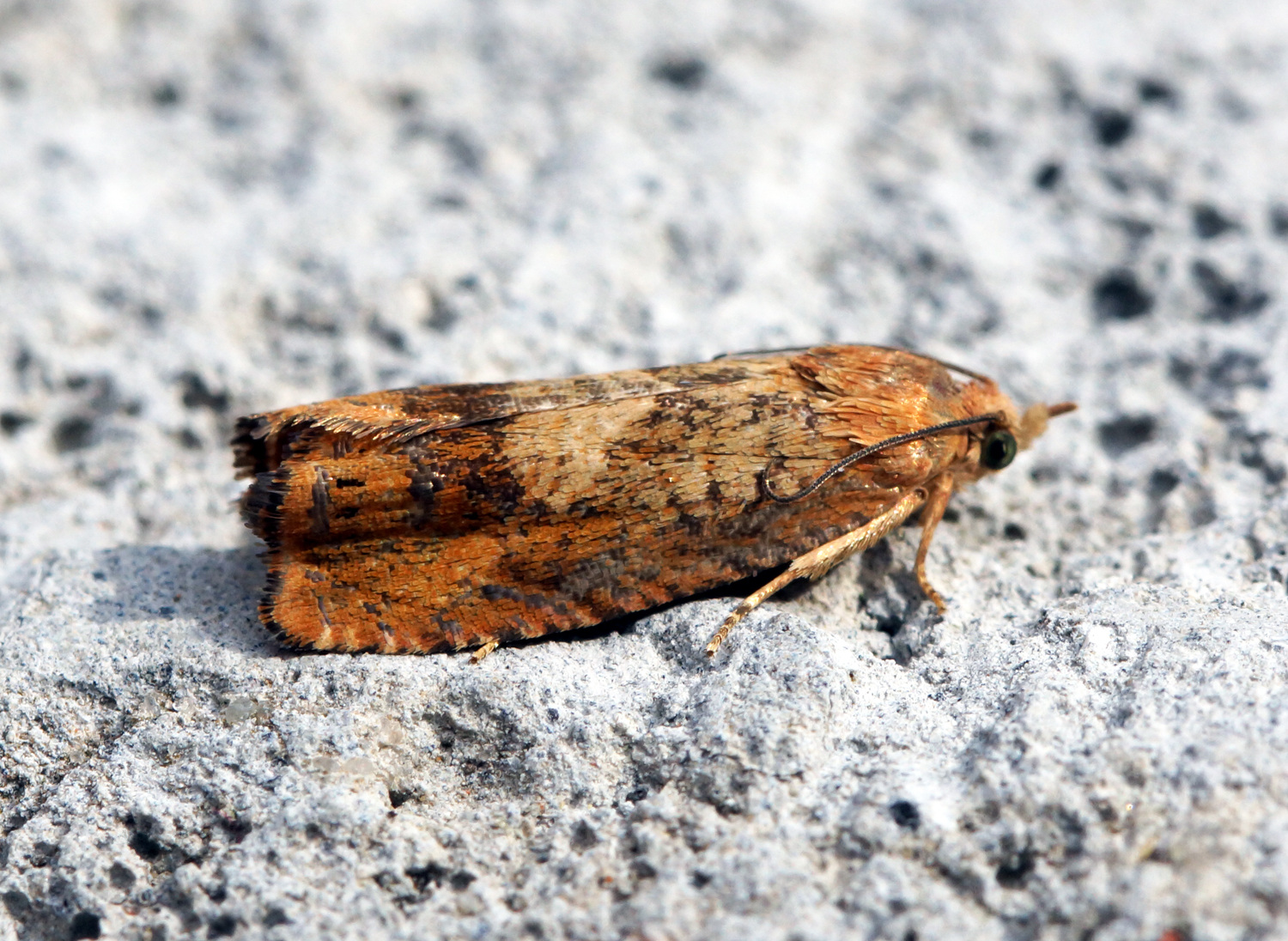
