= Cydia curiosa =

Scientific classification
- Kingdom: Animalia
- Phylum: Arthropoda
- Class: Insecta
- Order: Lepidoptera
- Family: Tortricidae
- Genus: Cydia
- Species: C. curiosa

Binomial name
- Cydia curiosa Razowski, 2009

Species of moth

Cydia curiosa is a moth of the family Tortricidae. It was described by Razowski in 2009 and is endemic to Vietnam.

The wingspan is 24 millimetres (0.94 in).
