= Cydia leucostoma =

Tea flush worm

Scientific classification
- Kingdom: Animalia
- Phylum: Arthropoda
- Class: Insecta
- Order: Lepidoptera
- Family: Tortricidae
- Genus: Cydia
- Species: C. leucostoma

Binomial name
- Cydia leucostoma (Meyrick, 1912)

Synonyms
- Laspeyresia leucostoma Meyrick, 1912

Species of moth

Cydia leucostoma, the tea flush worm, is a moth of the family Tortricidae. It is found in India, Sri Lanka, Taiwan and Indonesia (Java and Brunei).

The wingspan is 11–15 mm. Adults are on wing from May to October.
