= Cydia gypsograpta =

Scientific classification
- Kingdom: Animalia
- Phylum: Arthropoda
- Class: Insecta
- Order: Lepidoptera
- Family: Tortricidae
- Genus: Cydia
- Species: C. gypsograpta

Binomial name
- Cydia gypsograpta (Meyrick, 1932)

Synonyms
- Adenoneura gypsograpta Meyrick, 1932

Species of moth

Cydia gypsograpta is a moth of the family Tortricidae. It was described by Edward Meyrick in 1932. It is endemic to the Hawaiian island of Oahu.

Cydia gypsograpta is known from a single male presumably collected near Honolulu – although this might be the locality where the specimen was mailed from, with its true origin elsewhere in the Hawaiian Islands. It is presumed extinct. The larvae possibly used Canavalia as the host.
