= Cydia glandicolana =

Scientific classification
- Kingdom: Animalia
- Phylum: Arthropoda
- Class: Insecta
- Order: Lepidoptera
- Family: Tortricidae
- Genus: Cydia
- Species: C. glandicolana

Binomial name
- Cydia glandicolana (Danilevsky in Danilevsky & Kuznetsov, 1968)

Synonyms
- Laspeyresia glandicolana Danilevsky in Danilevsky & Kuznetsov, 1968

Species of moth

Cydia glandicolana is a moth of the family Tortricidae. It is found in China (north east, Huapei, north west, Huantung), the Korean Peninsula, Japan and Russia (Amur).

The wingspan is 14–20 mm. Adults are on wing in July and August in the Russian Far East and in August and September in Japan and Korea. There is one generation per year.

The larvae feed on Castanea mollitissima, Quercus mongolica, Quercus dentate and Quercus serrata. It is an important pest of chestnut in China.
