= Cydia kurokoi =

Nut fruit tortrix

Scientific classification
- Kingdom: Animalia
- Phylum: Arthropoda
- Class: Insecta
- Order: Lepidoptera
- Family: Tortricidae
- Genus: Cydia
- Species: C. kurokoi

Binomial name
- Cydia kurokoi (Amsel, 1960)

Synonyms
- Laspeyresia kurokoi Amsel, 1960

Species of moth

Cydia kurokoi, the nut fruit tortrix, is a moth of the family Tortricidae. It is found in Japan, the Korean Peninsula and eastern China.

The wingspan is about 20 mm. Adults are on wing in August and September. There is one generation per year.

The larvae feed on Castanea seguinii, Castanea mollitissima, Castanea crenata and Quercus acutissima. The larvae feed inside the fruits of chestnut trees and damage them.
