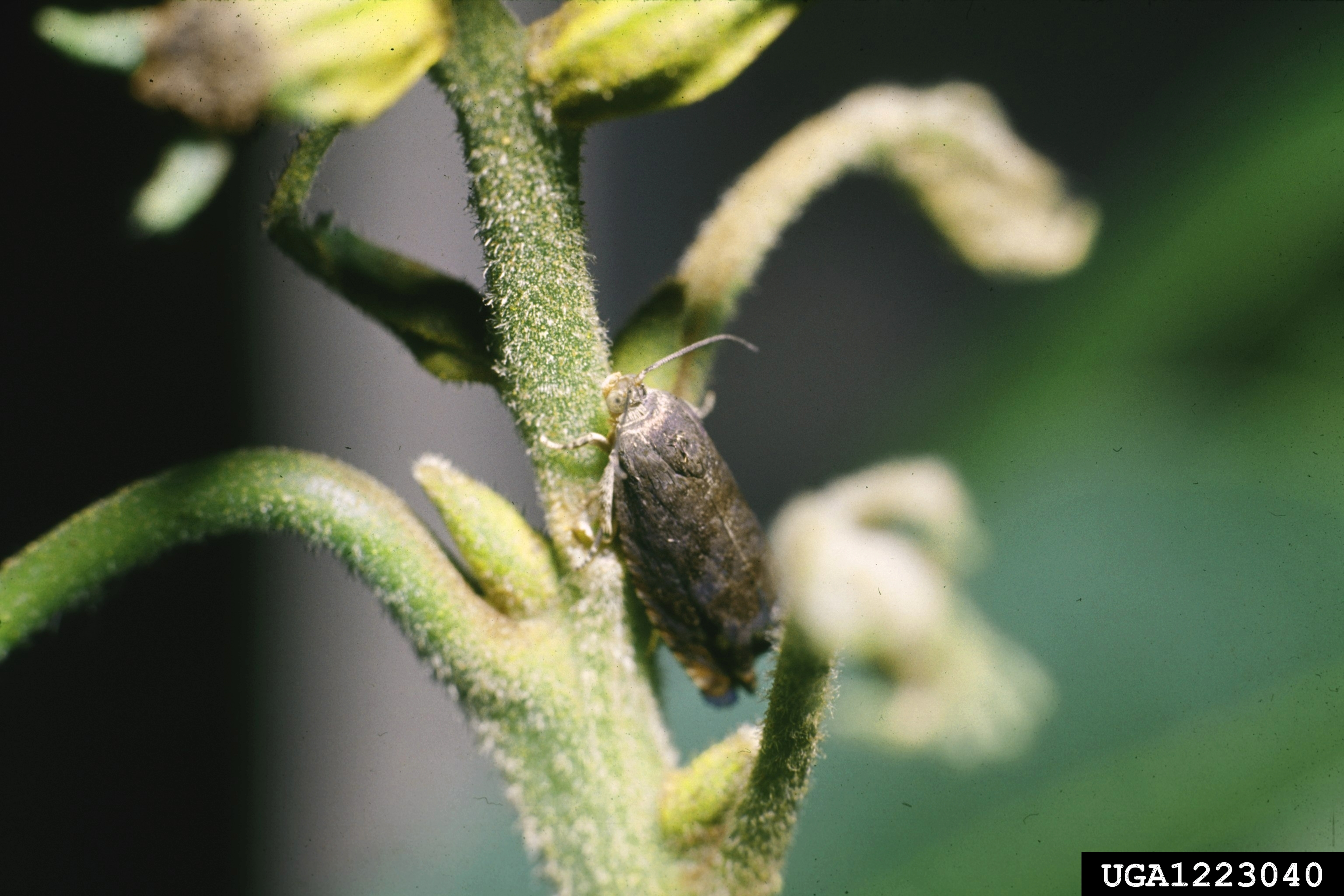

Scientific classification
- Kingdom: Animalia
- Phylum: Arthropoda
- Class: Insecta
- Order: Lepidoptera
- Family: Tortricidae
- Genus: Cydia
- Species: C. caryana

Binomial name
- Cydia caryana (Fitch, 1856)

Synonyms
- Ephippiphora caryana

= Cydia caryana =

Hickory shuckworm moth

Species of moth

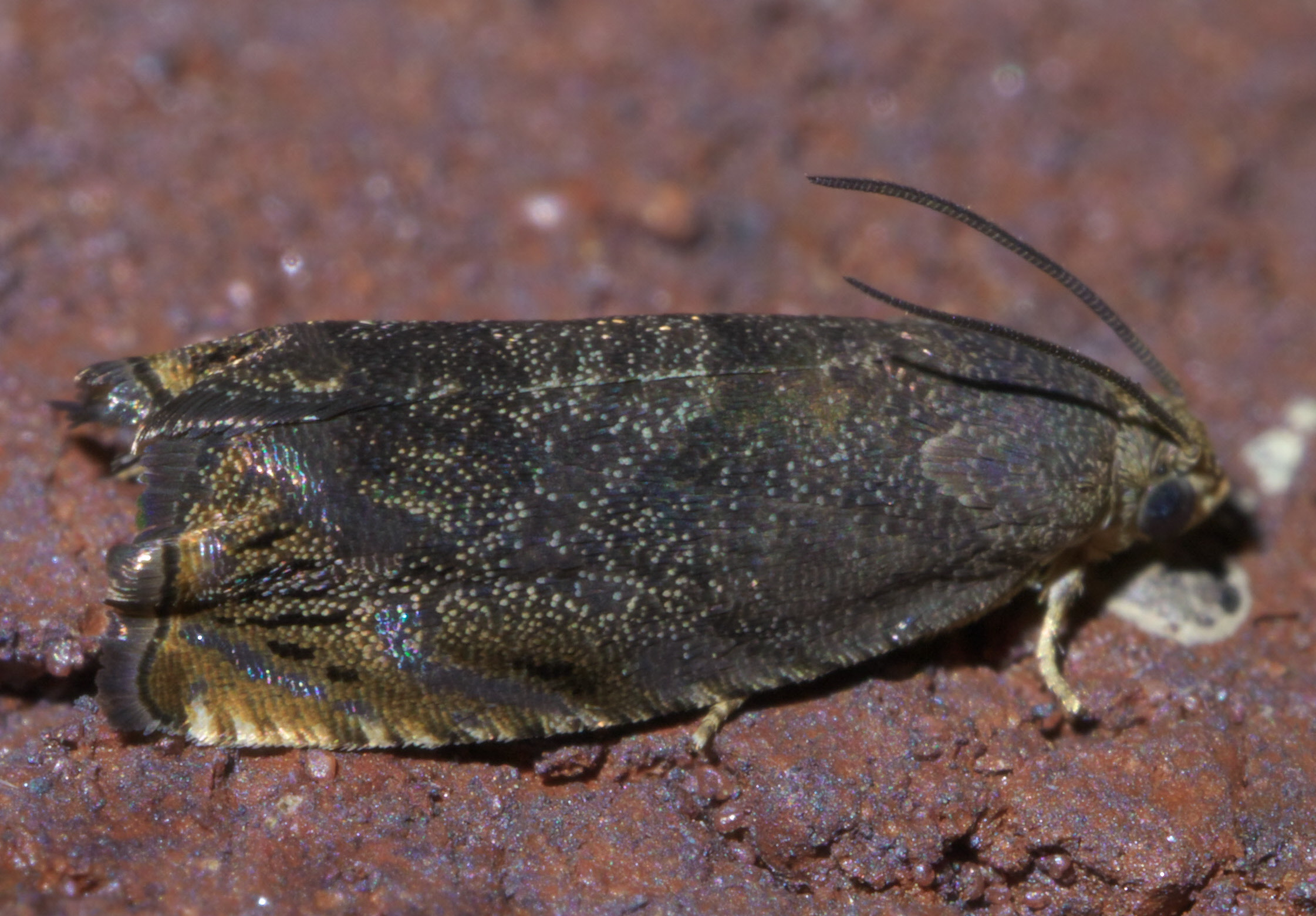
Cydia caryana, hickory shuckworm, size: 7.2 mm

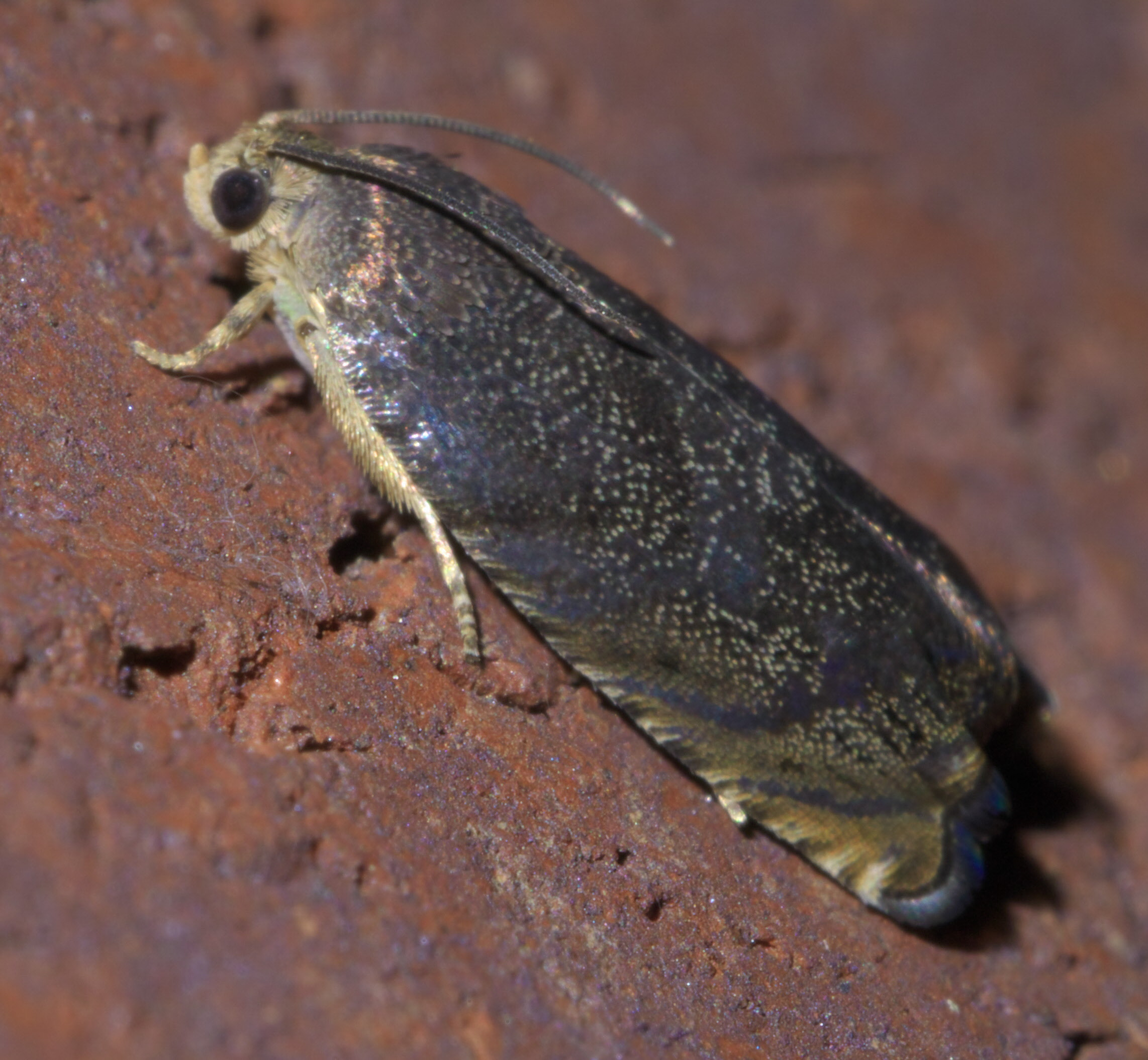
Cydia caryana, hickory shuckworm, size: 7.8 mm

Cydia caryana, the hickory shuckworm moth, is a moth of the family Tortricidae. It is found in North America.

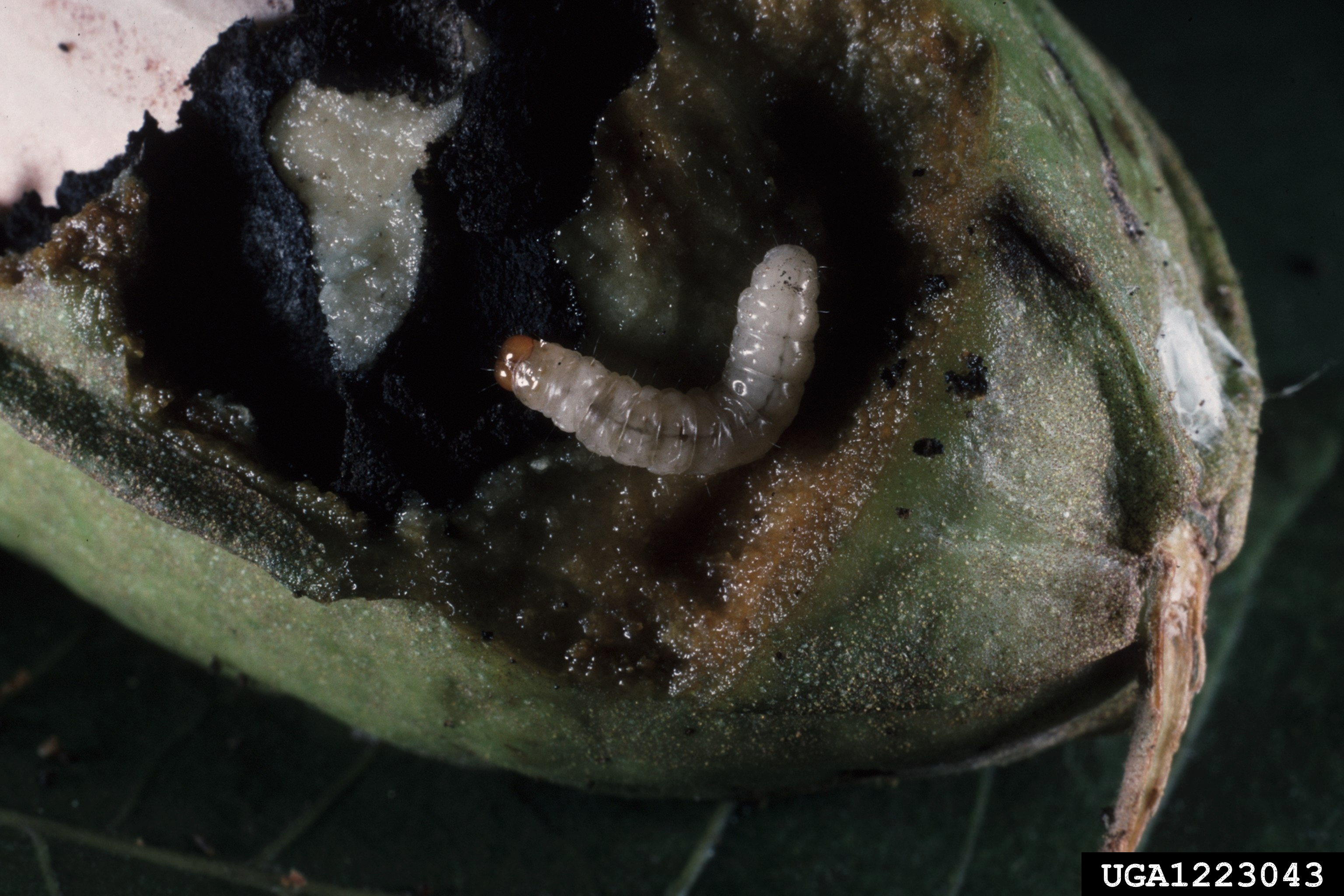
Caterpillar

== Description ==
The wingspan is 10–12 mm. Adults are on wing from June to July depending on the location.

== Distribution ==
Cydia caryana is found in Canada (Quebec, Ontario); and the eastern United States.

== Life cycle ==
=== Hosts ===
The primary hosts for Cydia caryana are pecan and hickory.
