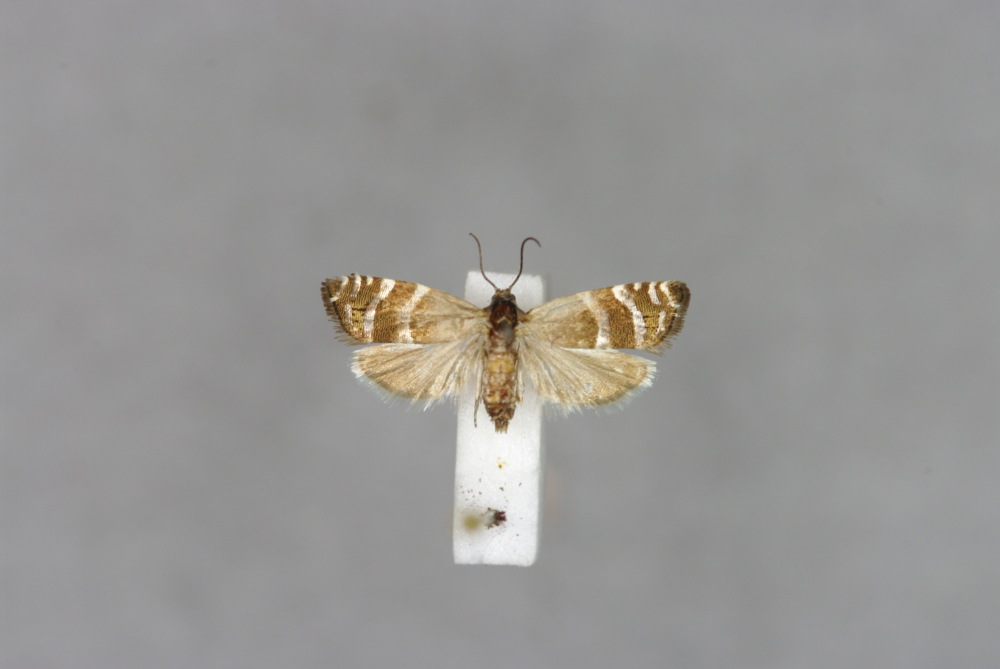

Scientific classification
- Kingdom: Animalia
- Phylum: Arthropoda
- Class: Insecta
- Order: Lepidoptera
- Family: Tortricidae
- Genus: Cydia
- Species: C. cosmophorana

Binomial name
- Cydia cosmophorana (Treitschke, 1835)

Synonyms
- Grapholitha cosmophorana Treitschke, 1835; Grapholitha dalecarliana Zetterstedt, 1839; Grapholitha geminana Zetterstedt, 1839; Grapholitha cosmophorana hinnebergiana Strand, 1920 (form); Tortrix obscurana Frolich, 1828

= Cydia cosmophorana =

Species of moth

Cydia cosmophorana is a moth of the family Tortricidae. It is found from northern and central Europe to eastern Russia.

The wingspan is 9–13 mm. Adults are on wing in May and June. At times there is a small second generation in August.

The larvae primarily feed on Pinus sylvestris, but have also been recorded on Pinus strobus, Picea excelsa and Juniperus communis.
