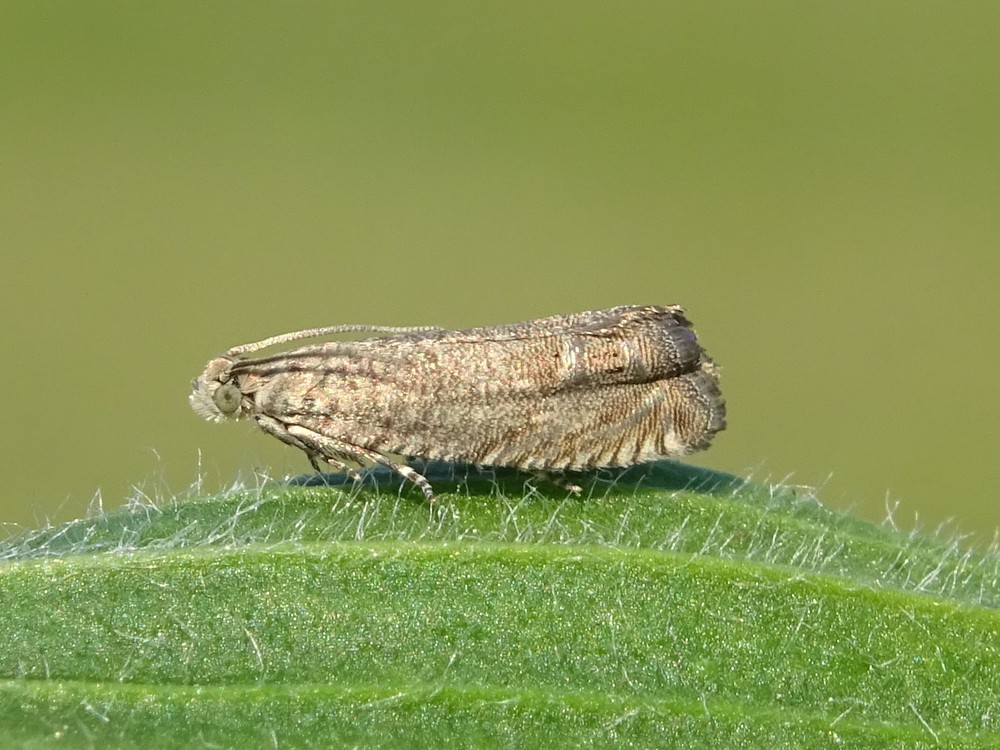

Scientific classification
- Kingdom: Animalia
- Phylum: Arthropoda
- Class: Insecta
- Order: Lepidoptera
- Family: Tortricidae
- Genus: Cydia
- Species: C. microgrammana

Binomial name
- Cydia microgrammana (Guenee, 1845)

= Cydia microgrammana =

Species of moth

Cydia microgrammana is a moth belonging to the family Tortricidae. The species was first described by Achille Guenée in 1845.

It is native to Europe. The palpi are whitish. The forewings are rather dark fuscous, finely and closely irrorated with pale greyish-ochreous, forming darker and lighter striae. The costa is strigulated with dark fuscous and whitish and there are some leaden metallic streaks from the costa posteriorly. The ocellus is edged with pale golden-metallic, including two or three black linear dots. The hindwings in the male are light grey, in the female darker.
