= Cydia medicaginis =

Alfalfa moth

Scientific classification
- Kingdom: Animalia
- Phylum: Arthropoda
- Clade: Pancrustacea
- Class: Insecta
- Order: Lepidoptera
- Family: Tortricidae
- Genus: Cydia
- Species: C. medicaginis

Binomial name
- Cydia medicaginis (Kuznetzov, 1962)

Synonyms
- Laspeyresia medicaginis Kuznetzov, 1962

Species of moth

Cydia medicaginis, the alfalfa moth, is a moth of the family Tortricidae. It is found in northern and central Europe (Great Britain, Latvia, Finland, Sweden, Denmark, Germany, France, Poland, Romania), Transcaucasus, Kazakhstan and from western Russia to southern Siberia.

The wingspan is 9–12 mm. Adults are on wing from early June to early August. There is one generation per year.

The larvae feed on Medicago, Genista, Ulex, Sarothammus, Cytisus and Lotus species. It is considered a pest of lucerne and other Leguminosae. The larvae feed on the seeds of the host plant.
