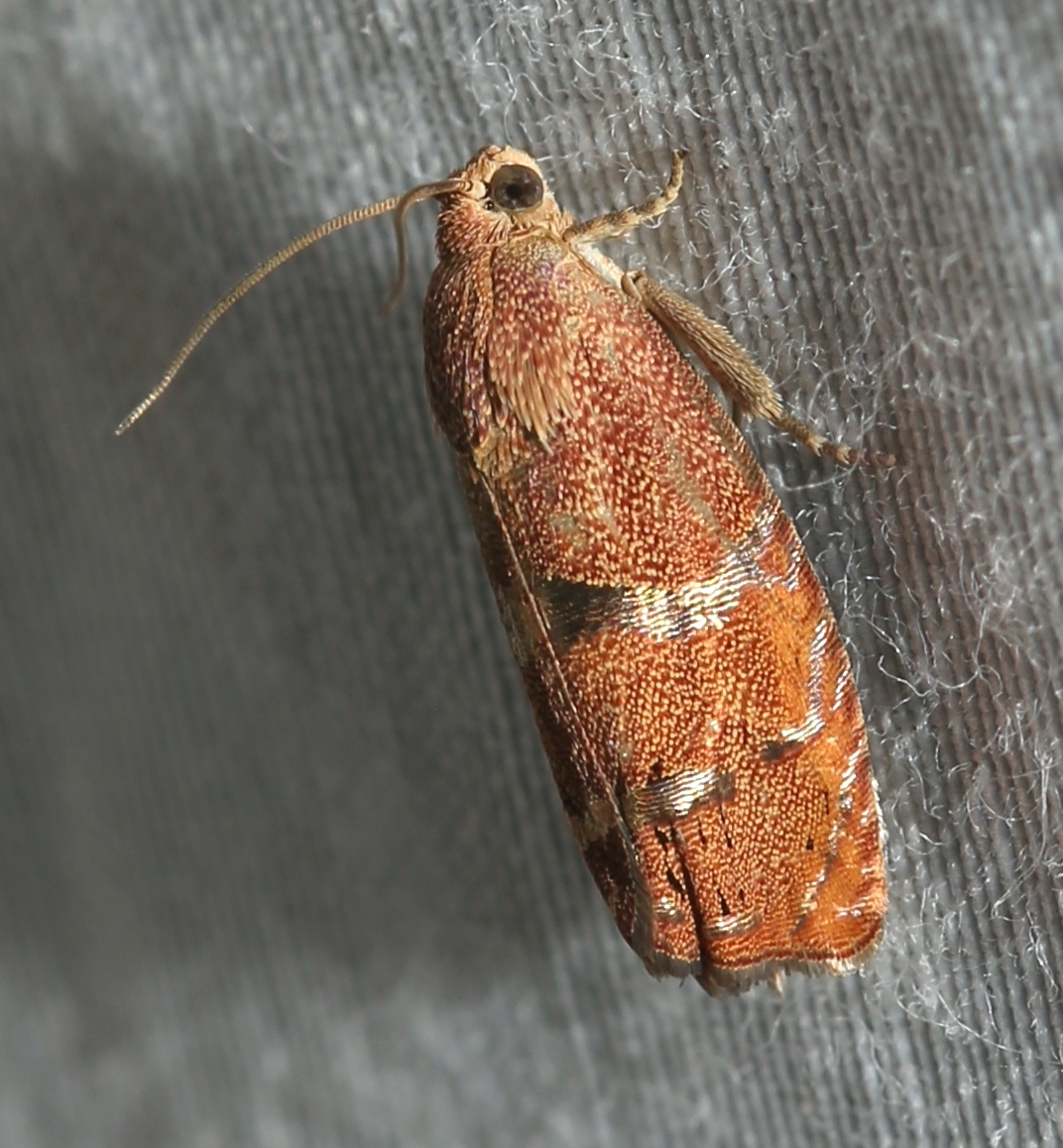

Scientific classification
- Kingdom: Animalia
- Phylum: Arthropoda
- Class: Insecta
- Order: Lepidoptera
- Family: Tortricidae
- Genus: Cydia
- Species: C. latiferreana

Binomial name
- Cydia latiferreana (Walsingham, 1879)

Synonyms
- Carpocapsa latiferreana; Melissopus latiferreanus

= Cydia latiferreana =

Filbertworm moth

Species of moth

Cydia latiferreana, the filbertworm moth, is a moth of the family Tortricidae. It was formerly (and sometimes is still) separated in a monotypic genus Melissopus.

It is found in most of North America. The wingspan is about 18 mm. Adults are on wing from July to October depending on the location.

The larvae (filbertworms) feed on the acorns of Quercus alba (white oak), Quercus macrocarpa, Quercus rubra and Quercus velutina but are most noted for feeding on hazelnuts—seeds of the genus Corylus—and are a major pest of hazelnut orchards in the Pacific northwest.
