= Cydia montana =

Scientific classification
- Kingdom: Animalia
- Phylum: Arthropoda
- Class: Insecta
- Order: Lepidoptera
- Family: Tortricidae
- Genus: Cydia
- Species: C. montana

Binomial name
- Cydia montana (Walsingham, 1907)

Synonyms
- Adenoneura montanum Walsingham, 1907

Species of moth

Cydia montana is a moth of the family Tortricidae. It was first described by Lord Walsingham in 1907. It is endemic to the island of Hawaii.

The larvae feed on Acacia koa.
