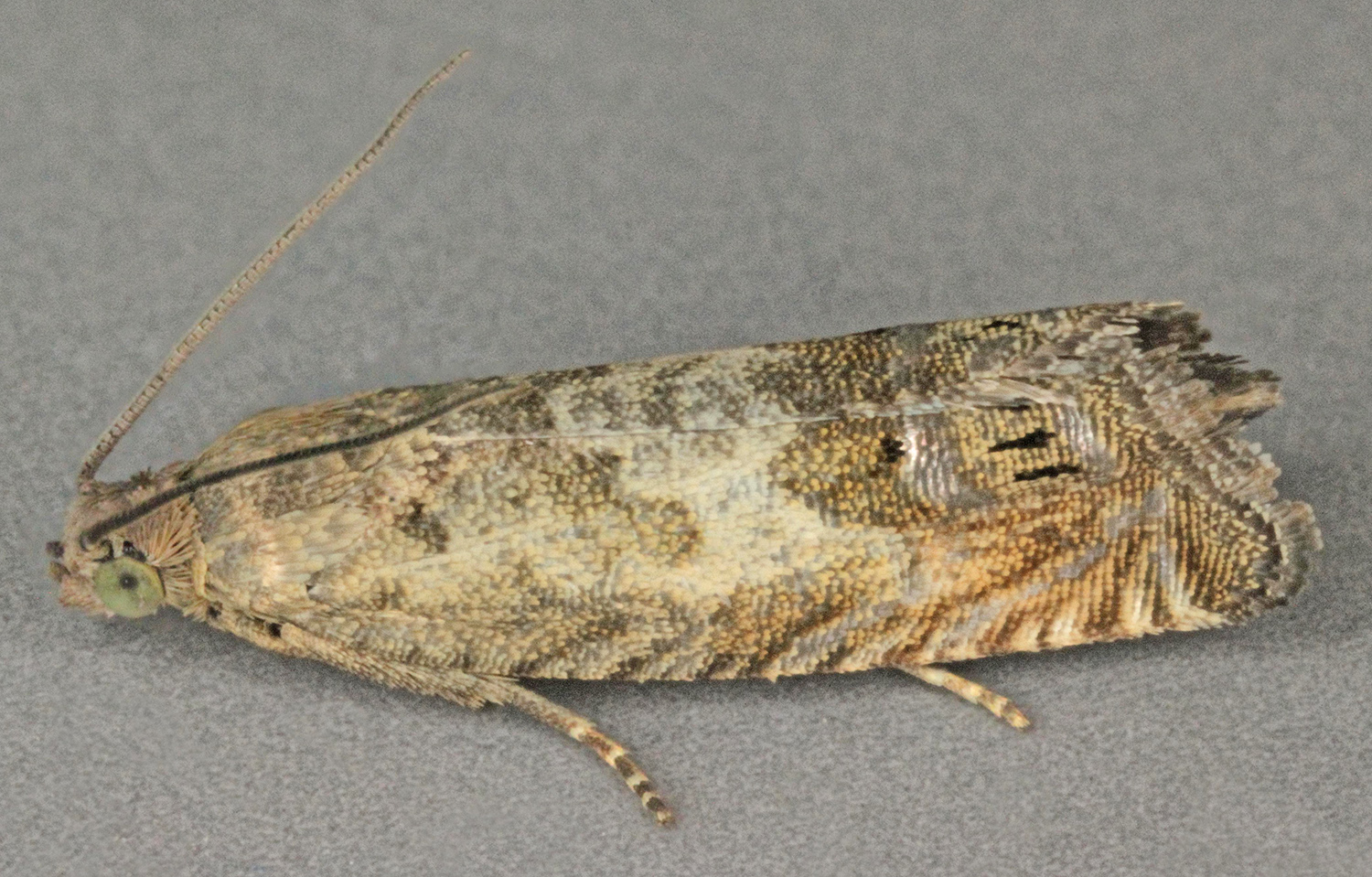

Scientific classification
- Kingdom: Animalia
- Phylum: Arthropoda
- Class: Insecta
- Order: Lepidoptera
- Family: Tortricidae
- Genus: Cydia
- Species: C. ulicetana

Binomial name
- Cydia ulicetana (Haworth, [1811])

Synonyms
- List: Tortrix ulicetana Haworth, [1811]; Cydia ulicitana; Laspeyresia ulicitana (Haworth, [1811]); Grapholitha conjunctana Moschler, 1866; Grapholitha consequana Zeller, 1847; Grapholitha adenocarpi var. lambessana Caradja, 1916; Grapholitha micaceana Constant, 1865

= Cydia ulicetana =

Species of moth

Cydia ulicetana is a moth of the family Tortricidae. It is native to western Europe, but was introduced to Hawaii.

The wingspan is 12–16 mm. Adults are on wing in May and in the south again from July to September in western Europe.

The larvae feed internally in the seedpods of various plants, including Ulex (such as Ulex europaeus) and Cytisus species.
