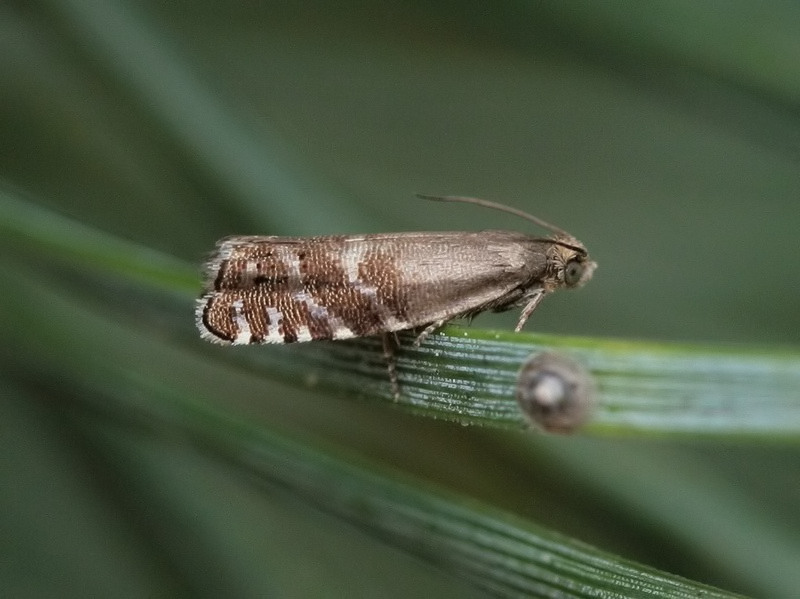

Scientific classification
- Kingdom: Animalia
- Phylum: Arthropoda
- Class: Insecta
- Order: Lepidoptera
- Family: Tortricidae
- Genus: Cydia
- Species: C. conicolana

Binomial name
- Cydia conicolana (Heylaerts, 1874)

= Cydia conicolana =

Species of moth

Cydia conicolana is a species of moth belonging to the family Tortricidae.

It is native to Europe.
