= Cydia chelias =

Scientific classification
- Kingdom: Animalia
- Phylum: Arthropoda
- Class: Insecta
- Order: Lepidoptera
- Family: Tortricidae
- Genus: Cydia
- Species: C. chelias

Binomial name
- Cydia chelias (Meyrick, 1907)

Synonyms
- Grapholita chelias Meyrick, 1907

Species of moth

Cydia chelias is a moth of the family Tortricidae first described by Edward Meyrick in 1907. It is found in Sri Lanka.
