= Cydia ergoda =

Scientific classification
- Kingdom: Animalia
- Phylum: Arthropoda
- Class: Insecta
- Order: Lepidoptera
- Family: Tortricidae
- Genus: Cydia
- Species: C. ergoda

Binomial name
- Cydia ergoda Razowski, 2013

Species of moth

Cydia ergoda is a moth of the family Tortricidae. It is found in Nigeria.

The wingspan is about 16 mm.
