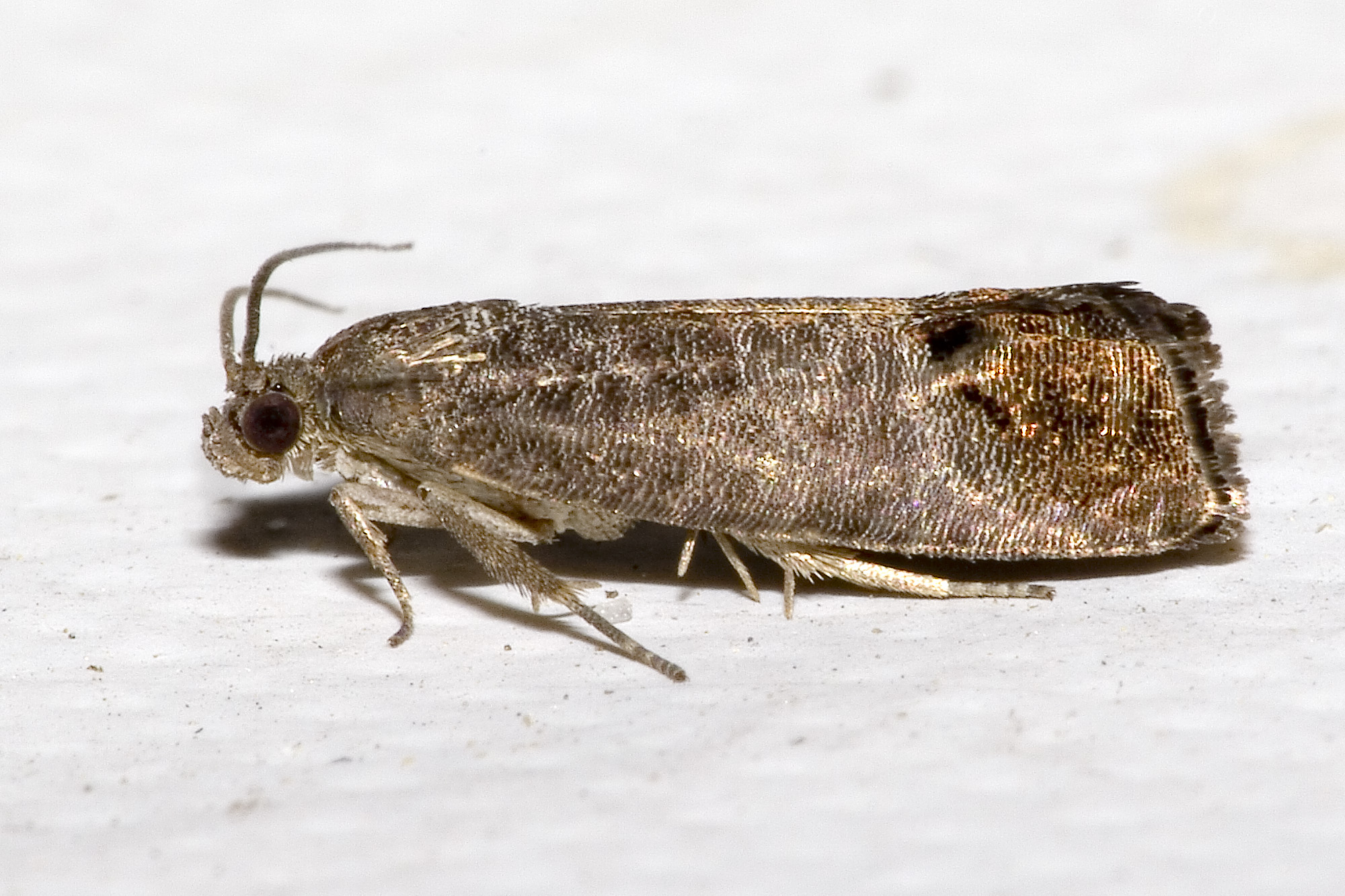

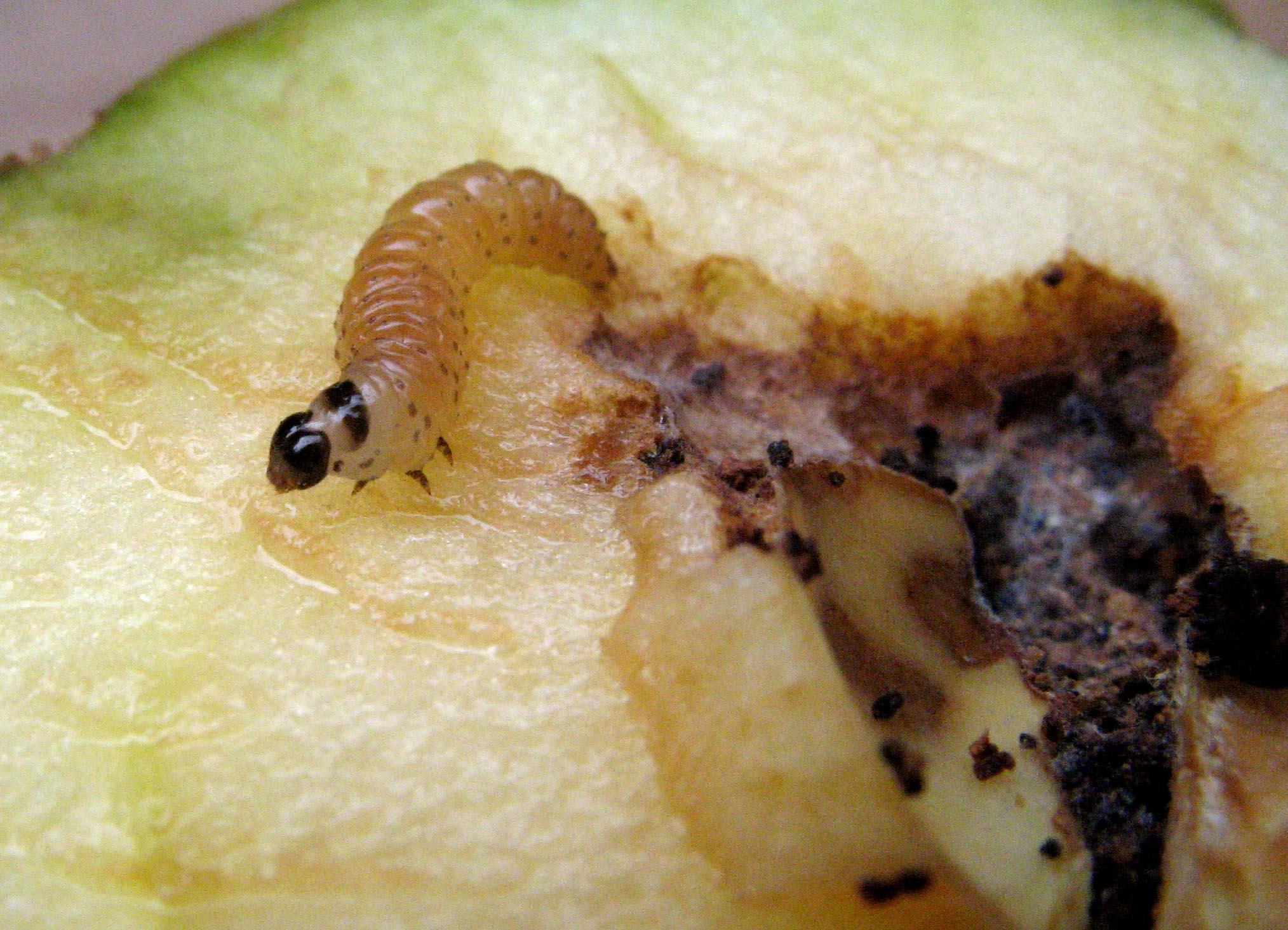
- Imago (above) and caterpillar (below) of the codling moth (C. pomonella)

Scientific classification
- Kingdom: Animalia
- Phylum: Arthropoda
- Clade: Pancrustacea
- Class: Insecta
- Order: Lepidoptera
- Family: Tortricidae
- Subfamily: Olethreutinae
- Tribe: Grapholitini
- Genus: Cydia; Hübner, 1825

Type species
- Phalaena (Tortrix) pomonella Linnaeus, 1758

Diversity
- About 215 species (but see text)

Synonyms
- Numerous, see text

= Cydia (moth) =

Genus of tortrix moths

Cydia is a large genus of tortrix moths, belonging to the tribe Grapholitini of subfamily Olethreutinae. Its distinctness from and delimitation versus the tribe's type genus Grapholita requires further study.

Moths in this genus are generally small and dull brown; their caterpillars are yellow or white and wormlike. Cydia includes many species of economic importance due to the damage their caterpillars inflict as pests of agricultural crops, especially fruit and nut trees. On the other hand, some Cydia species have been used for biological control of invasive weeds, and many of these small moths and their caterpillars are an important food source for other animals. A few species from the Hawaiian Islands are suspected to be extinct due to disappearance of their food plants.

Another well-known species is the jumping bean moth (C. saltitans), whose caterpillars live in Sebastiania seeds, turning them into the famous "Mexican jumping beans".

== Species ==
Roughly 215 species are currently recognized in Cydia, though as noted above, the list is provisional:

- Cydia acerivora (Danilevsky in Danilevsky & Kuznetsov, 1968)
- Cydia adenocarpi (Ragonot, 1875)
- Cydia alabastrina Diakonoff, 1983
- Cydia alazon (Diakonoff, 1976)
- Cydia albimaculana (Fernald, 1879)
- Cydia albipicta (Sauter, 1968)
- Cydia alienana (Caradja, 1916)
- Cydia americana (Walsingham, 1879)
- Cydia amplana – rusty oak moth
- Cydia amurensis (Danilevsky in Danilevsky & Kuznetsov, 1968)
- Cydia anaranjada – slash pine seedworm moth
- Cydia aphrosema Diakonoff, 1987
- Cydia aphrospila (Meyrick, 1921)
- Cydia araucariae (Pastrana, 1951)
- Cydia archaeochrysa Diakonoff, 1986
- Cydia astragalana (Staudinger, 1871)
- Cydia atlantica Chambon & Frérot, 1985
- Cydia blackmoreana (Walsingham, 1903)
- Cydia bracteatana (Fernald in Comstock, 1881)
- Cydia brownorum Rose & Pooni, 2003
- Cydia callizona (Meyrick, 1911)
- Cydia canariensis (Kuznetzov, 1972)
- Cydia candana (Forbes, 1923)
- Cydia caradjana (Rebel, 1910)
- Cydia caryana – hickory shuckworm moth
- Cydia celiae (Clarke, 1976)
- Cydia charops (Diakonoff, 1971)
- Cydia chelias (Meyrick, 1907)
- Cydia chlorostola (possibly extinct)
- Cydia cognatana (Barrett, 1874)
- Cydia colorana Kearfott, 1907
- Cydia commensalana (Danilevsky, 1963)
- Cydia confusana (McDunnough, 1935)
- Cydia conicolana (Heylaerts, 1874)
- Cydia coniferana (Saxesen in Ratzeburg, 1840)
- Cydia conoterma (Meyrick, 1922)
- Cydia conspicua (Walsingham, 1907)
- Cydia cornucopiae (Tengstrom, 1869)
- Cydia corollana (Hübner, [1823])
- Cydia corona Bippus, 2020
- Cydia cosmophorana (Treitschke, 1835)
- Cydia costastrigulana (McDunnough, 1935)
- Cydia crassicornis (possibly extinct)
- Cydia cryptomeriae (Issiki in Issiki & Mutuura, 1961)
- Cydia cupressana Kearfott, 1907
- Cydia curiosa Razowski, 2009
- Cydia curitibana Schönherr, 1987
- Cydia curvivalva Liu & Yan, 1998
- Cydia cytisanthana Burmann & Pröse, 1988
- Cydia dadionopa (Diakonoff, 1976)
- Cydia daedalota (Meyrick, 1916)
- Cydia dalbergiacola Liu, 1992
- Cydia damascana (Razowski, 1966)
- Cydia danilevskyi (Kuznetzov, 1973)
- Cydia defensa (Meyrick, 1922)
- Cydia derrai Pröse, 1988
- Cydia deyana (Chrétien, 1915)
- Cydia dissulta Diakonoff, 1983
- Cydia dochmasima Diakonoff, 1987
- Cydia doria (Clarke, 1976)
- Cydia duplicana (Zetterstedt, 1839)
- Cydia elpore (Diakonoff, 1976)
- Cydia ergoda Razowski, 2013
- Cydia ermolenkoi (Danilevsky in Danilevsky & Kuznetsov, 1968)
- Cydia erotella (Heinrich, 1923)
- Cydia ethelinda (Meyrick, 1934)
- Cydia eucyanea Walsingham, 1914
- Cydia eudesma Walsingham, 1914
- Cydia exquisitana (Rebel, 1889)
- Cydia fabivora (Meyrick, 1928)
- Cydia fagiglandana – beech moth
- Cydia fahlbergiana (Thunberg, 1797)
- Cydia falsifalcellum
- Cydia farsica (Kuznetzov in Danilevsky & Kuznetsov, 1968)
- Cydia fletcherana (Kearfott, 1907)
- Cydia flexiloqua (Heinrich, 1926)
- Cydia gallaesaliciana (Riley, 1881)
- Cydia garacana (Kearfott, 1907)
- Cydia gilviciliana (Staudinger, 1859)
- Cydia glandicolana
- Cydia grandicula (Heinrich, 1926)
- Cydia grunertiana (Ratzeburg, 1868)
- Cydia guttifera (Meyrick, 1913)
- Cydia gypsograpta (possibly extinct)
- Cydia honorana (Herrich-Schäffer, 1851)
- Cydia hygrotrema (Diakonoff, 1971)
- Cydia ilipulana (Walsingham, 1903)
- Cydia illustrana (Kuznetzov in Ler, 1986)
- Cydia illutana
- Cydia indivisa
- Cydia infausta (Walsingham, 1900)
- Cydia inflata (Meyrick, 1916)
- Cydia informosana (Walker, 1863)
- Cydia ingens – longleaf pine seedworm moth
- Cydia ingrata (Heinrich, 1926)
- Cydia injectiva (Heinrich, 1926)
- Cydia inopiosa (Heinrich, 1926)
- Cydia inquinatana
- Cydia interscindana (Möschler, 1866)
- Cydia intexta (Kawabe, 1980)
- Cydia japonensis Kawabe, 1980
- Cydia johanssoni Aarvik & Karsholt, 1993
- Cydia kamijoi (Oku, 1968)
- Cydia kozlovi (Kuznetzov, 1962)
- Cydia kurokoi – nut fruit tortrix
- Cydia lacustrina (Miller, 1976)
- Cydia lajonquierei (Capuse, 1970)
- Cydia largo Heppner, 1981
- Cydia laricana (Busck, 1916)
- Cydia laricicolana (Kuznetzov, 1960)
- Cydia larimana (Walsingham, 1895)
- Cydia latifemoris
- Cydia latiferreana – filbertworm moth (sometimes separated in Melissopus)
- Cydia latisigna Miller, 1986
- Cydia lautiuscula (Heinrich, 1926)
- Cydia leguminana (Lienig & Zeller, 1846)
- Cydia leucobasis (Busck, 1916)
- Cydia leucogrammana (Hofmann, 1898)
- Cydia leucostoma – tea flush worm
- Cydia maackiana (Danilevsky, 1963)
- Cydia malesana (Meyrick, 1920)
- Cydia marathonana Pröse & Sutter, 1973
- Cydia maxima (Kuznetzov, 1973)
- Cydia medicaginis – alfalfa moth
- Cydia mediocris (Kuznetzov, 1972)
- Cydia melanoptycha Diakonoff, 1983
- Cydia membrosa (Heinrich, 1926)
- Cydia menoides Walsingham, 1914
- Cydia microgrammana (Guenée, 1845)
- Cydia millenniana – larch gall moth
- Cydia miscitata (Heinrich, 1926)
- Cydia montana
- Cydia montezuma Miller, 1986
- Cydia monticola (Kuznetzov, 1962)
- Cydia multilineana (Kearfott, 1907)
- Cydia multistriana (Chrétien, 1915)
- Cydia nebulocula (Diakonoff, 1976)
- Cydia negatana (Rebel in Rebel & Rogenhofer, 1896)
- Cydia neolopha (Meyrick, 1926)
- Cydia nigra (Miller, 1966)
- Cydia nigricana – pea moth
- Cydia ninana Dyar, 1903
- Cydia nomaea (Meyrick, 1917)
- Cydia obliqua (may belong in C. plicatum)
- Cydia obnisa (Heinrich, 1926)
- Cydia obtecta (Meyrick, 1922)
- Cydia obumbrana Kuznetzov, 1992
- Cydia odontica Diakonoff, 1983
- Cydia omana Razowski, 1995
- Cydia oxytropidis (Martini, 1912)
- Cydia pactolana – spruce bark tortrix
- Cydia palmetum (Heinrich, 1928)
- Cydia pamira (Obraztsov, 1943)
- Cydia parapteryx
- Cydia peiui (Stanoiu & Neme, 1974)
- Cydia pentalychna (Meyrick in Caradja & Meyrick, 1938)
- Cydia perelegans (Kuznetzov, 1962)
- Cydia perfricta (Meyrick, 1920)
- Cydia periclydonia Diakonoff, 1983
- Cydia perlaeta Walsingham, 1914
- Cydia perrupta (Meyrick, 1922)
- Cydia persica (Kuznetzov in Danilevsky & Kuznetsov, 1968)
- Cydia phalacris (Meyrick, 1912)
- Cydia phyllisi Miller, 1986
- Cydia piperana – ponderosa pine seedworm moth
- Cydia plicatum (may include C. obliqua, C. storeella)
- Cydia plumbiferana (Staudinger, 1871)
- Cydia pomonella – codling moth
- Cydia populana (Busck, 1916)
- Cydia prismatica (Meyrick, 1911)
- Cydia prosperana (Kearfott, 1907)
- Cydia pseudomalesana Clarke, 1986
- Cydia pseudotsugae (Evans, 1969)
- Cydia pulchella Durrant in Walsingham, 1914
- Cydia pycnochra (Meyrick, 1920)
- Cydia pyraspis (Meyrick, 1928)
- Cydia pyrivora – pear fruit moth, pear tortricid
- Cydia rana (Forbes, 1924)
- Cydia reflectrix (Meyrick, 1928)
- Cydia rhodaspis (Meyrick, 1928)
- Cydia rjabovi (Kuznetzov, 1962)
- Cydia rufipennis
- Cydia saltitans – jumping bean moth
- Cydia sammuti Diakonoff, 1986
- Cydia secretana (Kuznetzov, 1973)
- Cydia seductana (Kuznetzov, 1962)
- Cydia semicinctana (Kennel, 1901)
- Cydia servillana (Duponchel in Godart, 1836)
- Cydia siderocosma (Diakonoff, 1969)
- Cydia signifer Walsingham, 1914
- Cydia silvana (Kuznetzov, 1970)
- Cydia splendana – chestnut tortrix, acorn moth
- Cydia staphiditis (Meyrick, 1930)
- Cydia stirpicola (Meyrick, 1926)
- Cydia storeella (possibly extinct or belongs in C. plicatum)
- Cydia striatana (Caradja, 1916)
- Cydia strigulatana (Kennel, 1899)
- Cydia strobilella – spruce seed moth
- Cydia succedana
- Cydia sumptuosana (Rebel in Rebel & Zerny, 1928)
- Cydia tana (Kearfott, 1907)
- Cydia taocosma (Meyrick, 1914)
- Cydia tonosticha (Meyrick, 1922)
- Cydia toreuta – eastern pine seedworm moth
- Cydia torostoma (Clarke, 1972)
- Cydia trasias (Meyrick, 1928)
- Cydia trichota Diakonoff, 1988
- Cydia trifascicolana Schönherr, 1987
- Cydia trogodana Pröse, 1988
- Cydia tropicana Kuznetzov, 1992
- Cydia tunisiana Aarvik & Karsholt, 1993
- Cydia turcianae Chambon in Chambon, Witzgall & Bengtsson, 1993
- Cydia ulicetana
- Cydia undosa (Diakonoff, 1957)
- Cydia uranatma (Meyrick, 1936)
- Cydia vallesiaca (Sauter, 1968)
- Cydia walsinghamii
- Cydia zebeana – larch bark moth

== Former species ==
- Cydia euryteles (Meyrick, 1936)

=== Synonyms ===
Obsolete scientific names (junior synonyms and others) of Cydia are:

- Adenoneura Walsingham, 1907
- Carpocampa Harris, 1841 (unjustified emendation)
- Carpocapsa Treitschke, 1829
- Cerata Stephens, 1852
- Coccyx Treitschke, 1829
- Collicularia Obraztsov, 1960
- Crobilophora (lapsus)
- Crobylophora Kennel, 1910 (non Meyrick, 1880: preoccupied)
- Danilevskia Kuznetzov, 1970
- Dicraniana Diakonoff, 1984
- Erminea Kirby & Spence, 1826
- Erminia (lapsus)
- Hedulia Heinrich, 1926
- Kenneliola Paclt, 1951
- Lasperesia (lapsus)
- Laspeyresia Hübner, 1825 (non R.L., 1817: preoccupied)
- Lespeyresia (lapsus)
- Melisopus (lapsus)
- Melissopus Riley, 1882
- Melliopus (lapsus)
- Mellisopus (lapsus)
- Mellissopus (lapsus)
- Phanetoprepa Obraztsov, 1968
- Pseudotomoides Obraztsov, 1959
- Semasia Stephens, 1829
- Strobila Sodoffsky, 1837 (non Sars, 1829: preoccupied)

In addition to the uncertain relationship of Cydia and Grapholita already mentioned above, the synonymy of the present genus has been subject to some confusion with its close relative Pammene: Eucelis, Trycheris and Orchemia are sometimes listed as junior synonyms of Cydia, but the type species of the former two is Tortrix mediana (a junior synonym of P. aurana), and that of the third is Orchemia gallicana (a junior synonym of P. gallicana).
