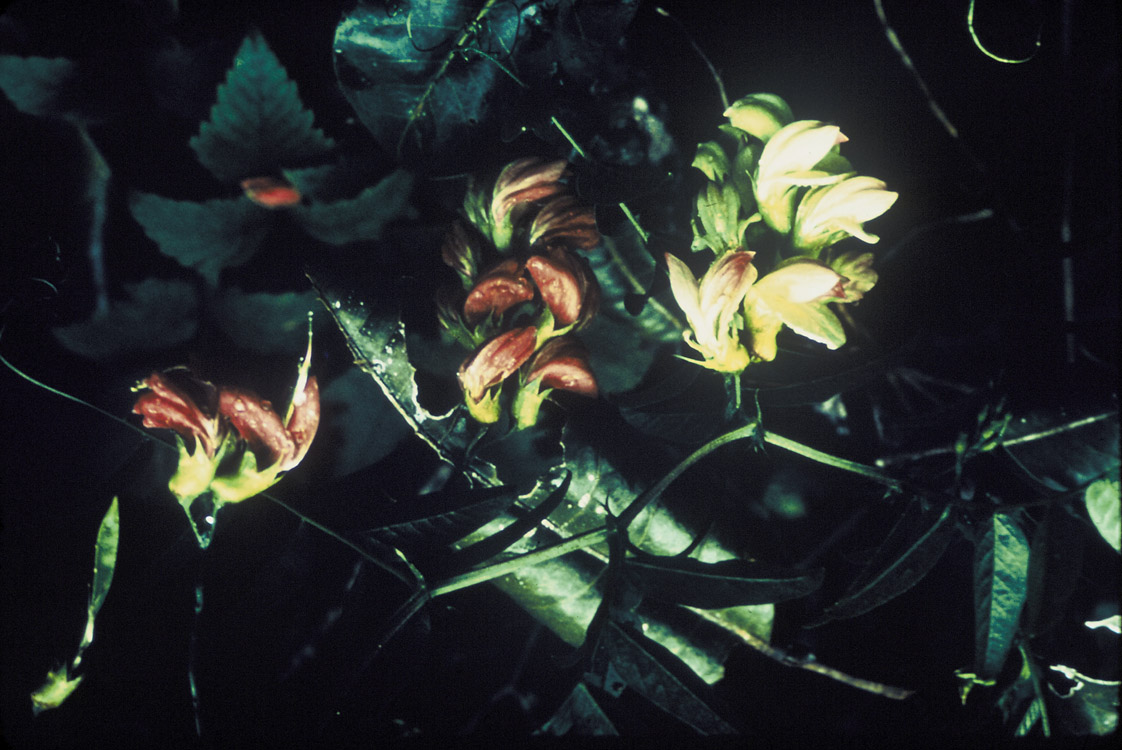

Conservation status
- Critically Endangered (IUCN 3.1)

- Critically Imperiled (NatureServe)

Scientific classification
- Kingdom: Plantae
- Clade: Tracheophytes
- Clade: Angiosperms
- Clade: Eudicots
- Clade: Rosids
- Order: Fabales
- Family: Fabaceae
- Subfamily: Faboideae
- Tribe: Fabeae
- Genus: Vicia
- Species: V. menziesii

Binomial name
- Vicia menziesii Spreng.

= Vicia menziesii =

Species of legume

Vicia menziesii is a rare species of flowering plant in the legume family known by the common name Hawaiian vetch. It is endemic to Hawaii, where it is known only from the island of Hawaii. It is threatened by habitat loss and exotic plants. It has been federally listed as an endangered species of the United States since 1978. It was the first Hawaiian plant to be placed on the Endangered Species List.

This plant is a liana which climbs into the surrounding trees, reaching a maximum length of 20 meters. A study found the average length of the vine to be 2.6 meters, with a maximum of 12.5 meters in the sample. The vine also branches and climbs in different directions. It may spread along the ground or over detritus for a few meters before climbing upward, but plants were observed climbing 8 meters up into the canopy. The leaves are 10 to 13 centimeters long and are made up of several pairs of leaflets each measuring up to 7 centimeters long by 3 wide. The leaves have tendrils at their tips. The plant produces inflorescences of 6 to 9 flowers with curving corollas up to 3 centimeters long. The flowers are yellowish white turning rose-pink with maturity and then purplish with age. The fruit is a black legume pod 9 or 10 centimeters long containing spherical black seeds.

The flowers are visited by the ʻiʻiwi (Vestiaria coccinea) and the ʻamakihi (Loxops virens virens), two species of Hawaiian honeycreepers. The shape and color of the flowers suggest they may be pollinated by birds.

This plant was first collected in 1794 by Archibald Menzies on Mauna Loa. It has also been collected from Mauna Kea, but it does not appear to occur there anymore. As of 1980 the total global population was made up of three colonies in an area one kilometer long on Mauna Loa. There are only 15 to 50 individuals in total.

This species was depicted on a U.S. commemorative stamp issued on June 7, 1979.
