= Cydia walsinghamii =

Scientific classification
- Kingdom: Animalia
- Phylum: Arthropoda
- Class: Insecta
- Order: Lepidoptera
- Family: Tortricidae
- Genus: Cydia
- Species: C. walsinghamii

Binomial name
- Cydia walsinghamii (Butler, 1882)

Synonyms
- Proteopteryx walsinghamii Butler, 1882; Enarmonia walsinghamii

Species of moth

Cydia walsinghamii is a moth of the family Tortricidae. It was first described by Arthur Gardiner Butler in 1882. It is endemic to the Hawaiian islands of Kauai, Oahu, Maui and Hawaii.
