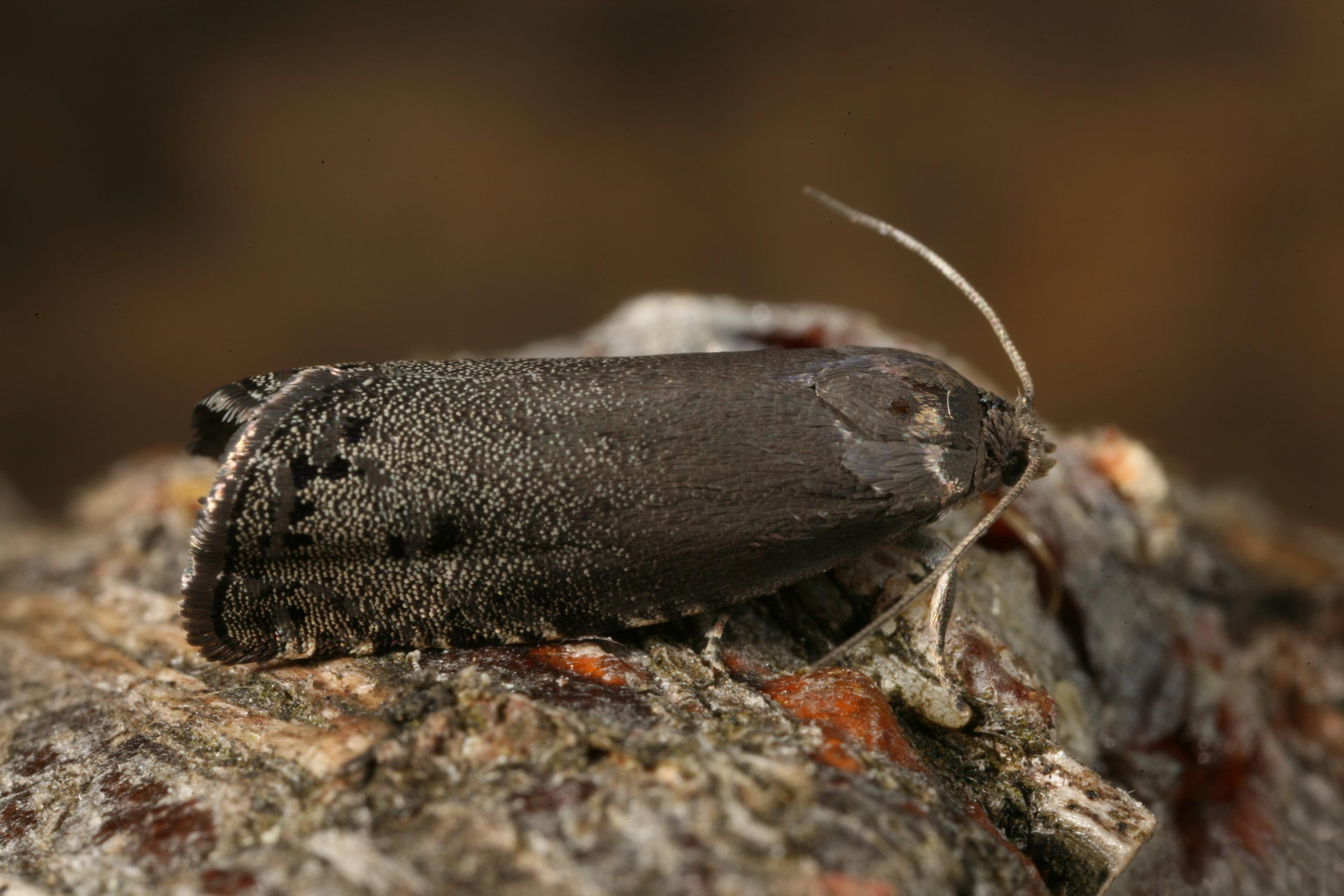

Scientific classification
- Kingdom: Animalia
- Phylum: Arthropoda
- Class: Insecta
- Order: Lepidoptera
- Family: Tortricidae
- Genus: Cydia
- Species: C. millenniana

Binomial name
- Cydia millenniana (Adamczewski, 1967)

Synonyms
- Laspeyresia millenniana Adamczewski, 1967; Cydia decidua Razowski, 1996; Laspeyresia deciduana Steuer, 1969; Cydia milleniana Razowski, 1991

= Cydia millenniana =

Larch gall moth

Species of moth

Cydia millenniana, the larch gall moth, is a moth of the family Tortricidae which galls larch (Larix spp). It is found from Europe to Russia and the Korean Peninsula.

== Gallery ==
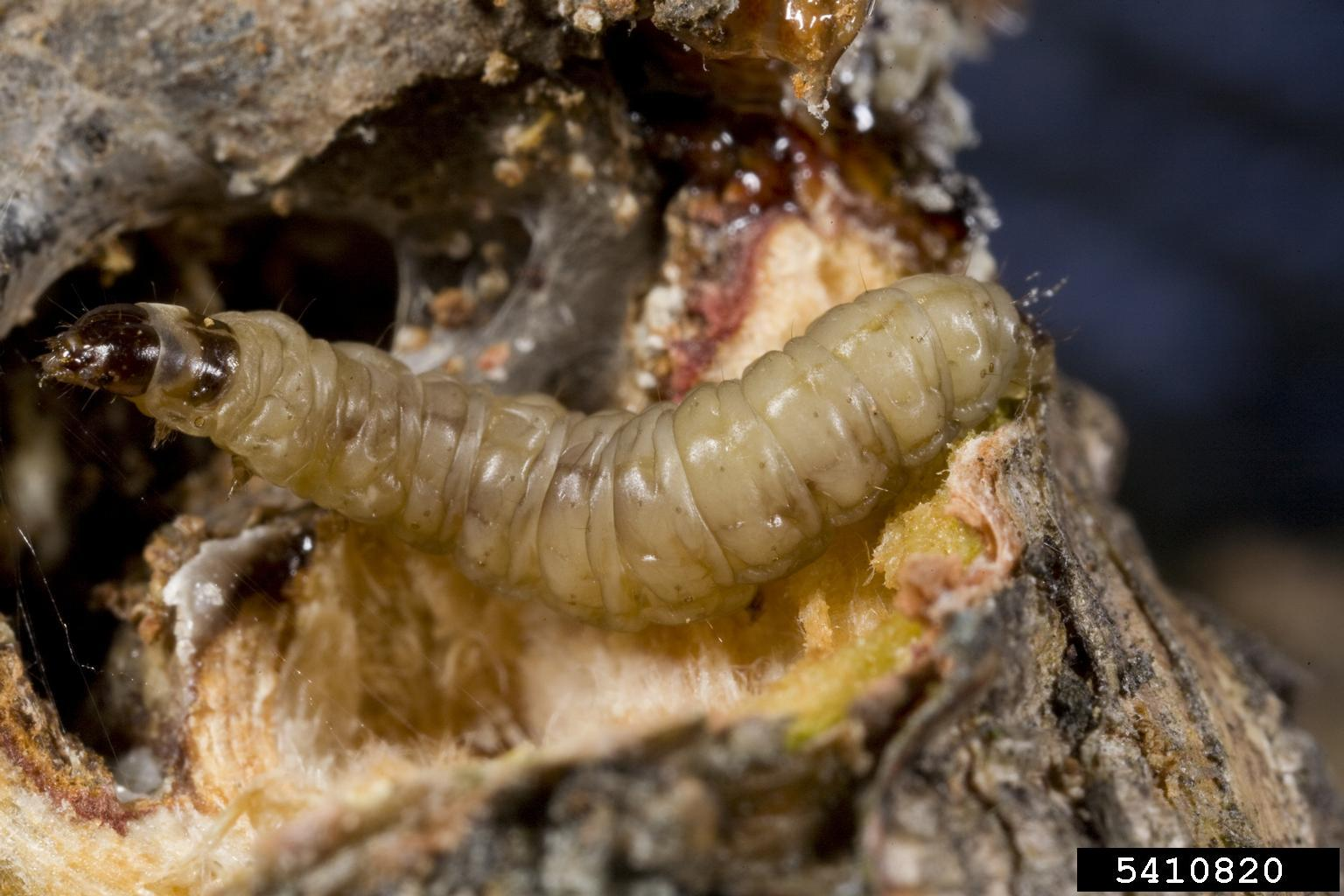
Larva

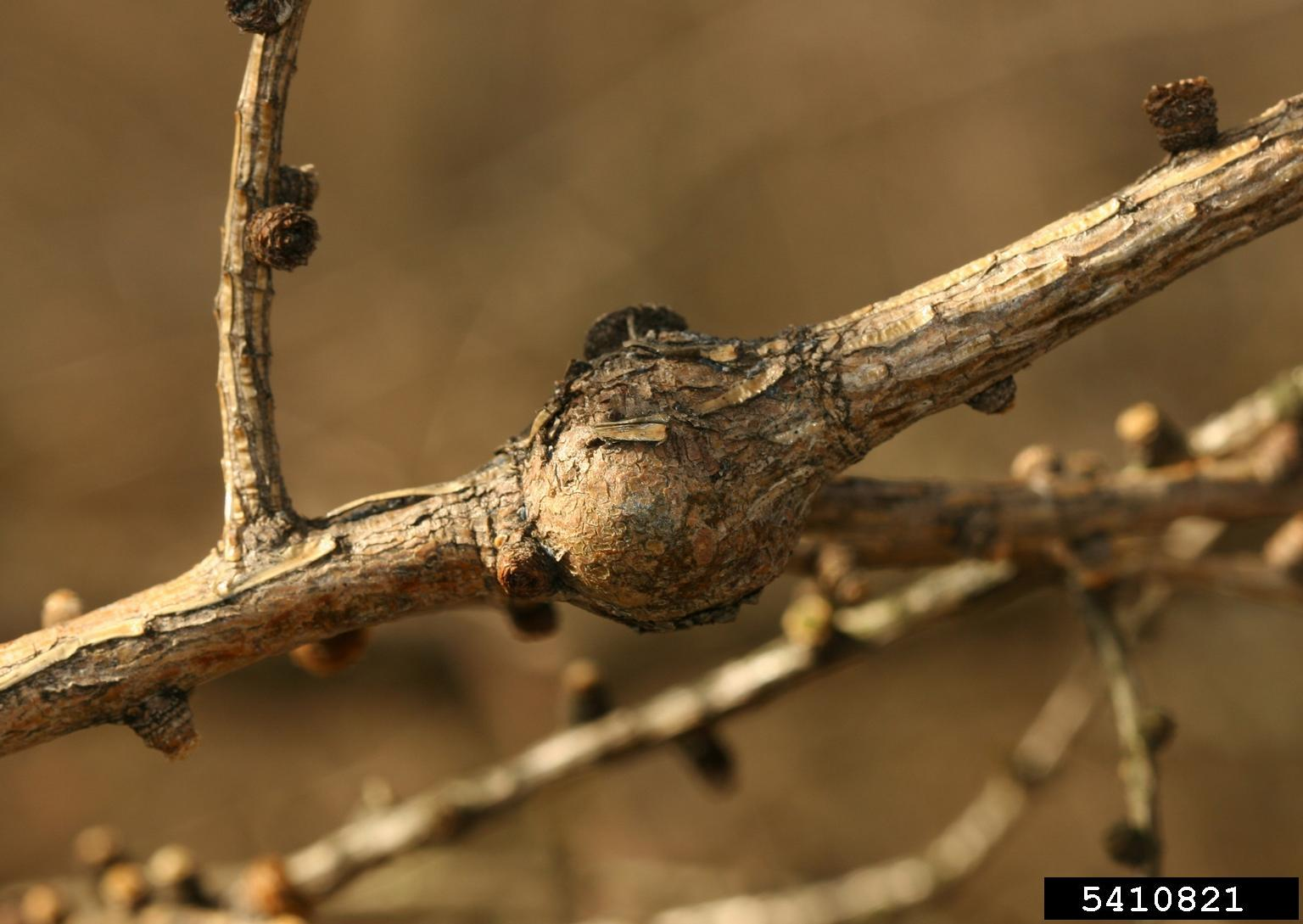
