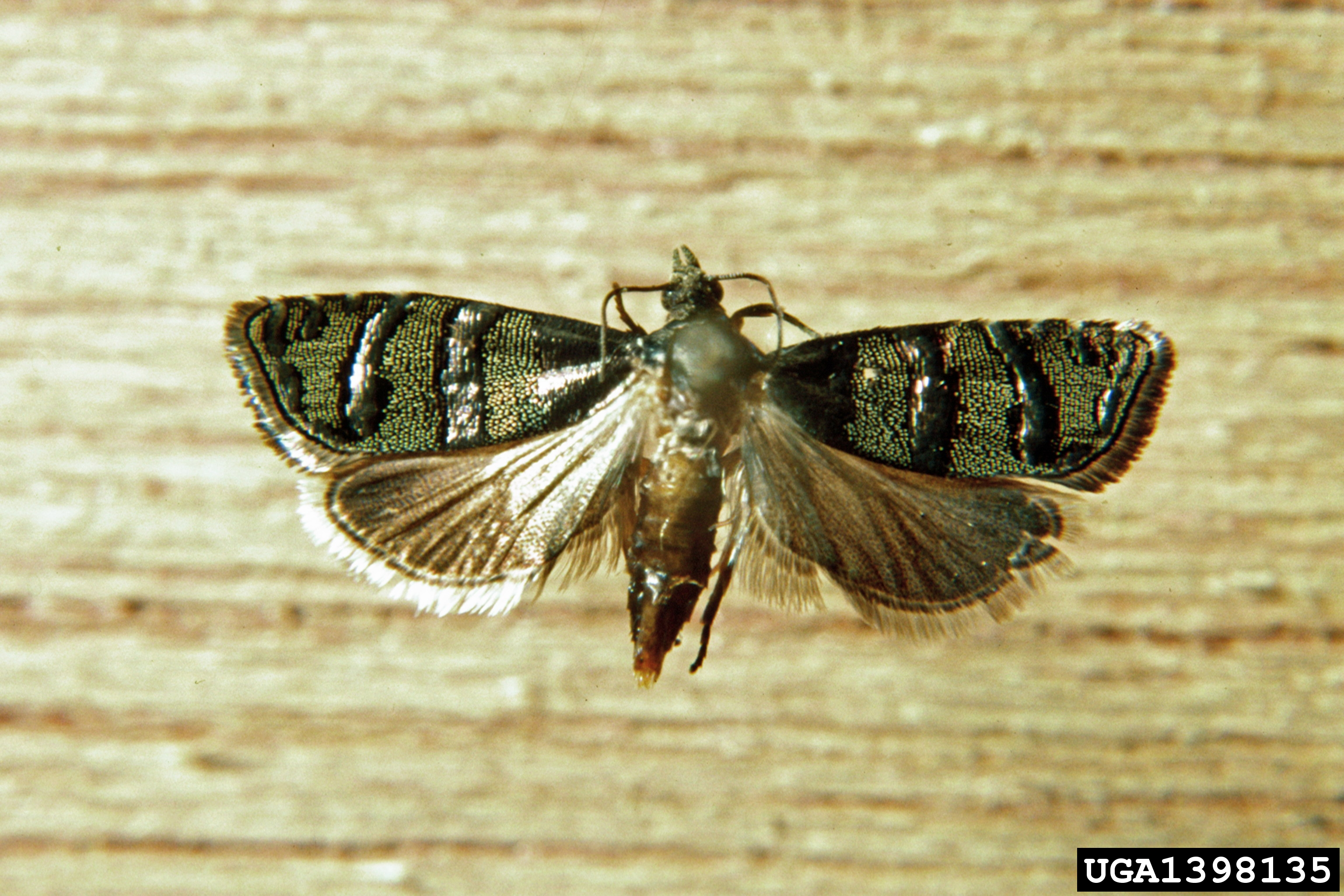

Scientific classification
- Kingdom: Animalia
- Phylum: Arthropoda
- Class: Insecta
- Order: Lepidoptera
- Family: Tortricidae
- Genus: Cydia
- Species: C. toreuta

Binomial name
- Cydia toreuta (Grote, 1873)

Synonyms
- Penthina toreuta

= Cydia toreuta =

Eastern pine seedworm moth

Species of moth

Cydia toreuta, the eastern pine seedworm moth, is a moth of the family Tortricidae. It is found in North America.

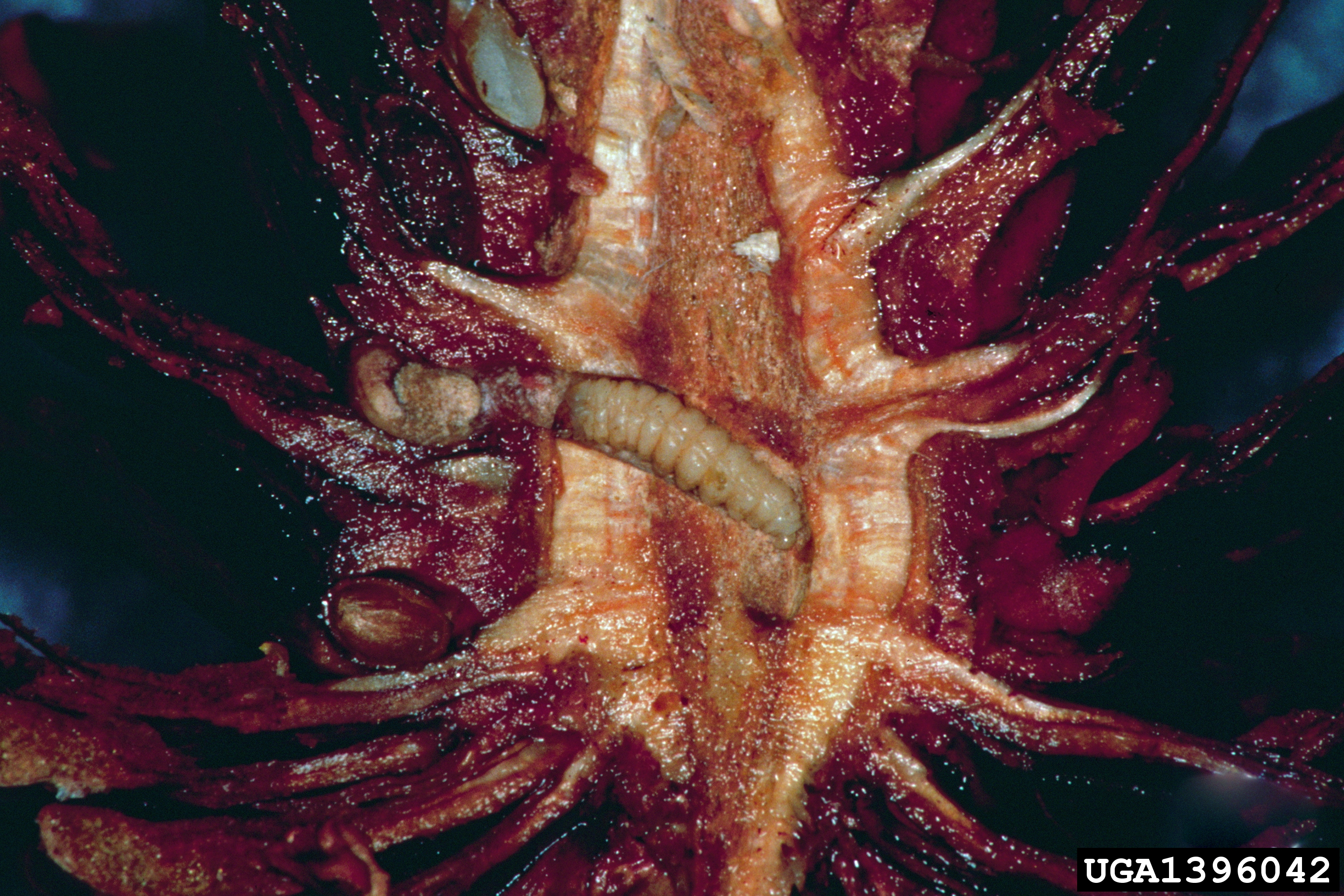
Caterpillar

The wingspan is about 13 mm.

The larvae feed on the seeds of Pinus resinosa and Pinus banksiana.
