= Cydia parapteryx =

Scientific classification
- Kingdom: Animalia
- Phylum: Arthropoda
- Class: Insecta
- Order: Lepidoptera
- Family: Tortricidae
- Genus: Cydia
- Species: C. parapteryx

Binomial name
- Cydia parapteryx (Meyrick, 1932)

Synonyms
- Adenoneura parapteryx Meyrick, 1932

Species of moth

Cydia parapteryx is a moth of the family Tortricidae. It was first described by Edward Meyrick in 1932. It is endemic to the Hawaiian island of Oahu.

The larvae feed on the seeds, stems and possibly the flowers of Canavalia species and Strongylodon ruber.
