= Epinotia gimmerthaliana =

Scientific classification
- Kingdom: Animalia
- Phylum: Arthropoda
- Clade: Pancrustacea
- Class: Insecta
- Order: Lepidoptera
- Family: Tortricidae
- Genus: Epinotia
- Species: E. gimmerthaliana

Binomial name
- Epinotia gimmerthaliana (Lienig & Zeller, 1846)

Species of moth

Epinotia gimmerthaliana is a moth belonging to the family Tortricidae. The species was first described by Friederike Lienig Philipp Christoph Zeller in 1846.

It is native to Europe.
