= Epinotia ulmicola =

Scientific classification
- Domain: Eukaryota
- Kingdom: Animalia
- Phylum: Arthropoda
- Class: Insecta
- Order: Lepidoptera
- Family: Tortricidae
- Genus: Epinotia
- Species: E. ulmicola

Binomial name
- Epinotia ulmicola Kuznetzov, 1966

Synonyms
- Epinotia (Hamuligera) ulmicola Kuznetzov, 1966

Species of moth

Epinotia ulmicola is a species of moth of the family Tortricidae. It is found in China (Guizhou, Shaanxi, Gansu), Korea, Japan and Russia.

The wingspan is 14–16 mm.

The larvae feed on Ulmus propinqua.
