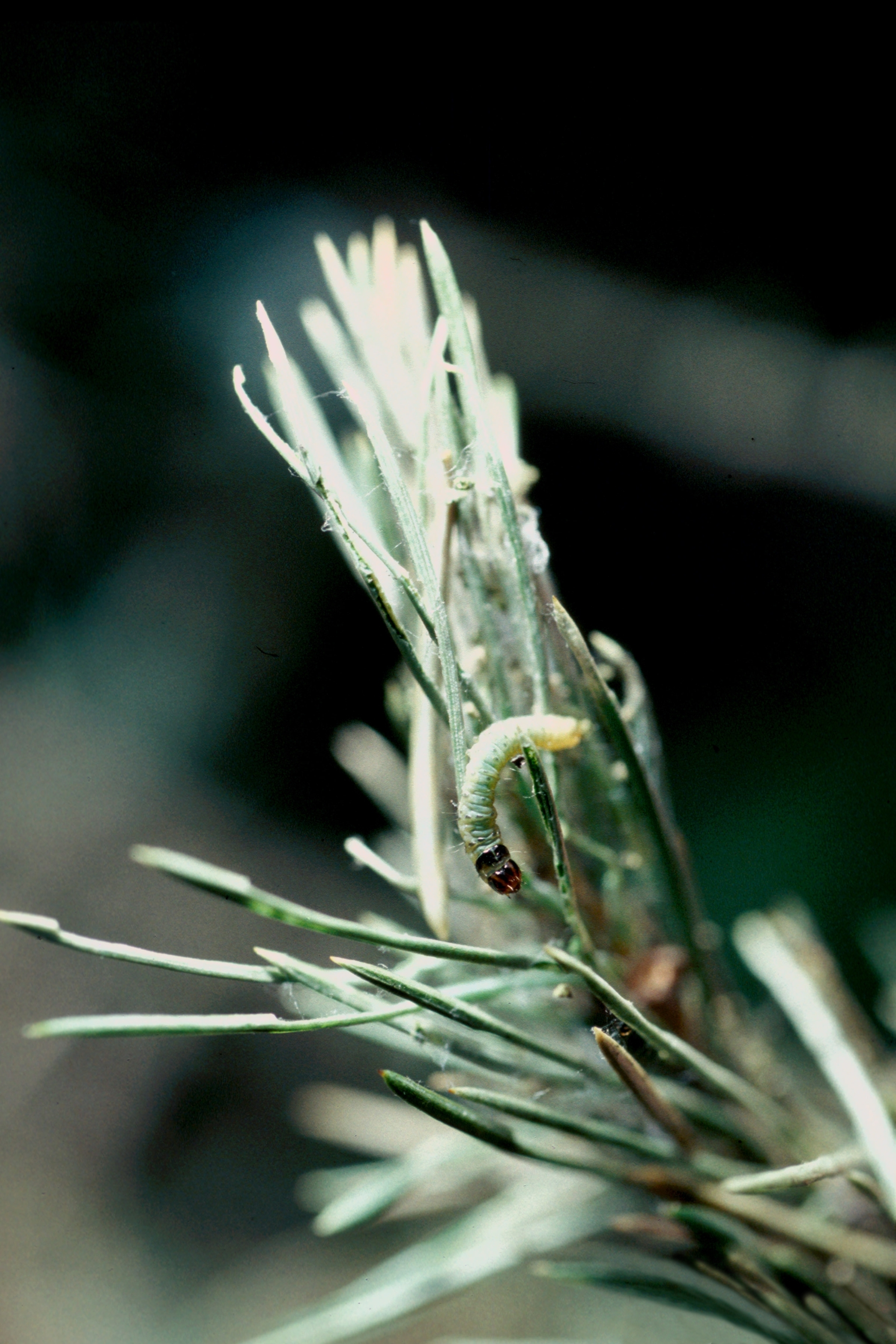

Scientific classification
- Domain: Eukaryota
- Kingdom: Animalia
- Phylum: Arthropoda
- Class: Insecta
- Order: Lepidoptera
- Family: Tortricidae
- Genus: Epinotia
- Species: E. cedricida

Binomial name
- Epinotia cedricida Diakonoff, 1969

Synonyms
- Epinotia (Evetria) cedricida Diakonoff, 1969

= Epinotia cedricida =

Species of moth

Epinotia cedricida is a species of moth of the family Tortricidae. It is found in Morocco, Algeria, Lebanon and Turkey. It is an introduced species in Europe, where it has been recorded from south-eastern France, Spain and Austria.

The wingspan is 12–15 mm. Adults are on wing from June to August.

The larvae feed on Cedrus species, including Cedrus atlantica and Cedrus libani.
