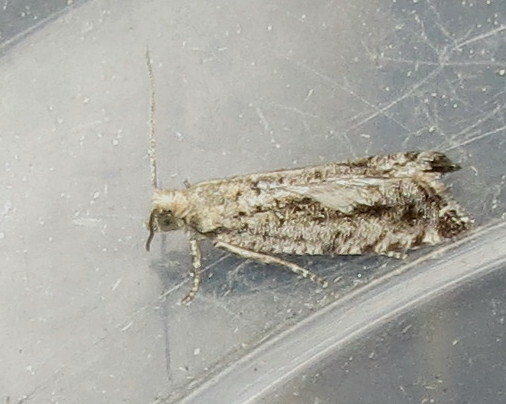

Scientific classification
- Domain: Eukaryota
- Kingdom: Animalia
- Phylum: Arthropoda
- Class: Insecta
- Order: Lepidoptera
- Family: Tortricidae
- Genus: Epinotia
- Species: E. granitana

Binomial name
- Epinotia granitana (Herrich-Schäffer, 1851)

= Epinotia granitana =

Species of moth

Epinotia granitana is a moth belonging to the family Tortricidae. The species was first described by Gottlieb August Wilhelm Herrich-Schäffer in 1851.

It is native to Europe.
