= Epinotia rasdolnyana =

Scientific classification
- Kingdom: Animalia
- Phylum: Arthropoda
- Class: Insecta
- Order: Lepidoptera
- Family: Tortricidae
- Genus: Epinotia
- Species: E. rasdolnyana

Binomial name
- Epinotia rasdolnyana (Christoph, 1882)

Synonyms
- Steganoptycha rasdolnyana Christoph, 1882; Epinotia rasdorniana Issiki, in Eakai et al., 1957

Species of moth

Epinotia rasdolnyana is a species of moth of the family Tortricidae. It is found in north-eastern China, Taiwan, Korea, Japan and Russia.

The wingspan is 15–21 mm.

The larvae feed on Acer pictum and Acer ukurunduense.
