= Epinotia algeriensis =

Scientific classification
- Domain: Eukaryota
- Kingdom: Animalia
- Phylum: Arthropoda
- Class: Insecta
- Order: Lepidoptera
- Family: Tortricidae
- Genus: Epinotia
- Species: E. algeriensis

Binomial name
- Epinotia algeriensis Chambon, in Chambon, Fabre & Khemeci, 1990

Species of moth

Epinotia algeriensis is a species of moth in the family Tortricidae. It is found in Algeria. The larvae feed on Cedrus atlantica.
