= Epinotia trossulana =

Scientific classification
- Domain: Eukaryota
- Kingdom: Animalia
- Phylum: Arthropoda
- Class: Insecta
- Order: Lepidoptera
- Family: Tortricidae
- Genus: Epinotia
- Species: E. trossulana

Binomial name
- Epinotia trossulana (Walsingham, 1879)

Synonyms
- Grapholitha trossulana Walsingham, 1879

Species of moth

Epinotia trossulana is a moth of the family Tortricidae. It is found in western North America, from British Columbia, south through Utah to California.

The larvae feed on Abies species. They mine within needles or bundles of needles of their host plant.
