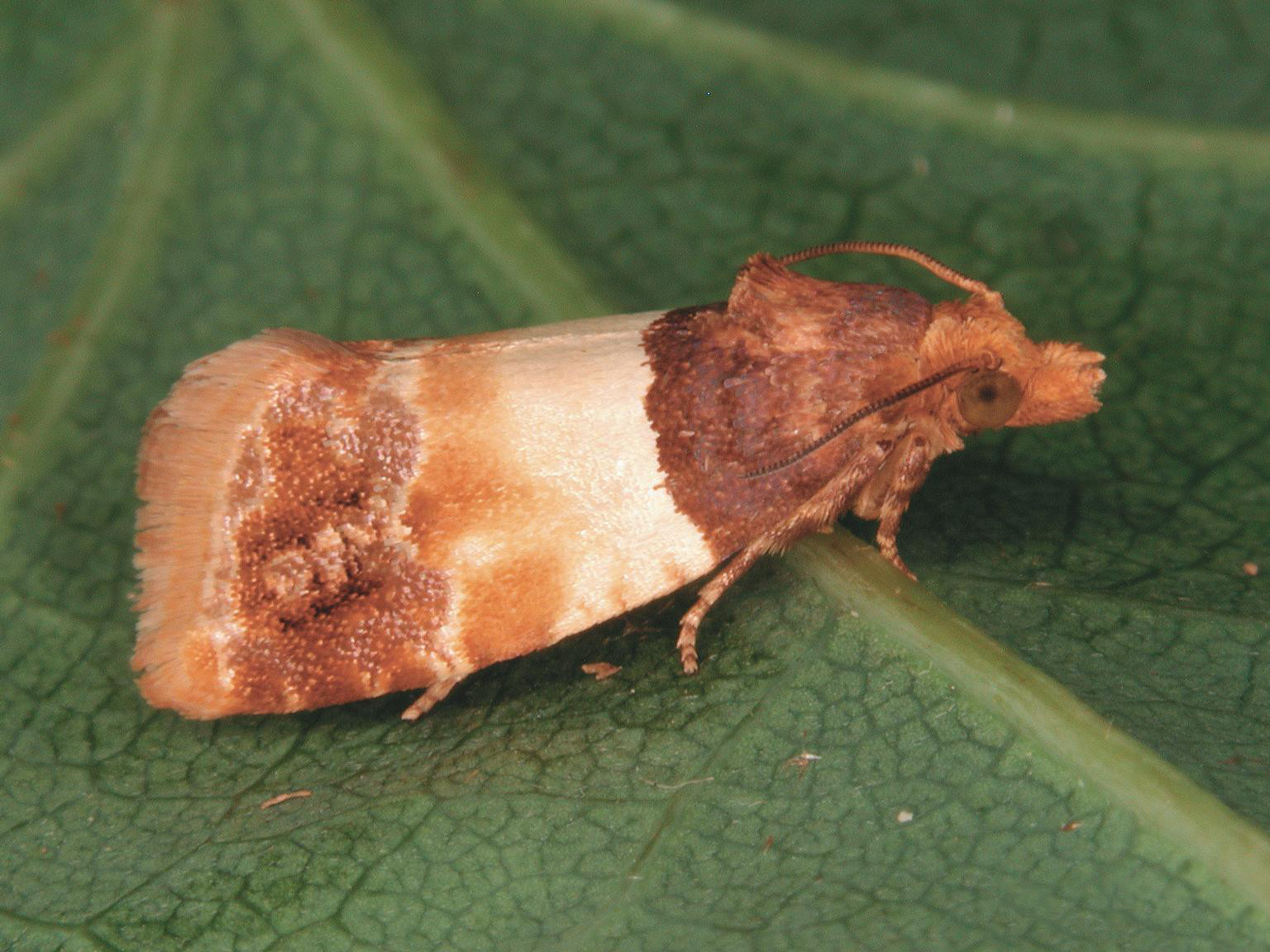

Scientific classification
- Kingdom: Animalia
- Phylum: Arthropoda
- Clade: Pancrustacea
- Class: Insecta
- Order: Lepidoptera
- Family: Tortricidae
- Genus: Epinotia
- Species: E. festivana

Binomial name
- Epinotia festivana (Hubner, 1799)

Synonyms
- Tortrix festivana Hubner, [1796-1799]

= Epinotia festivana =

Species of moth

Epinotia festivana is a species of moth of the family Tortricidae. It is found in most of southern Europe and the Near East.

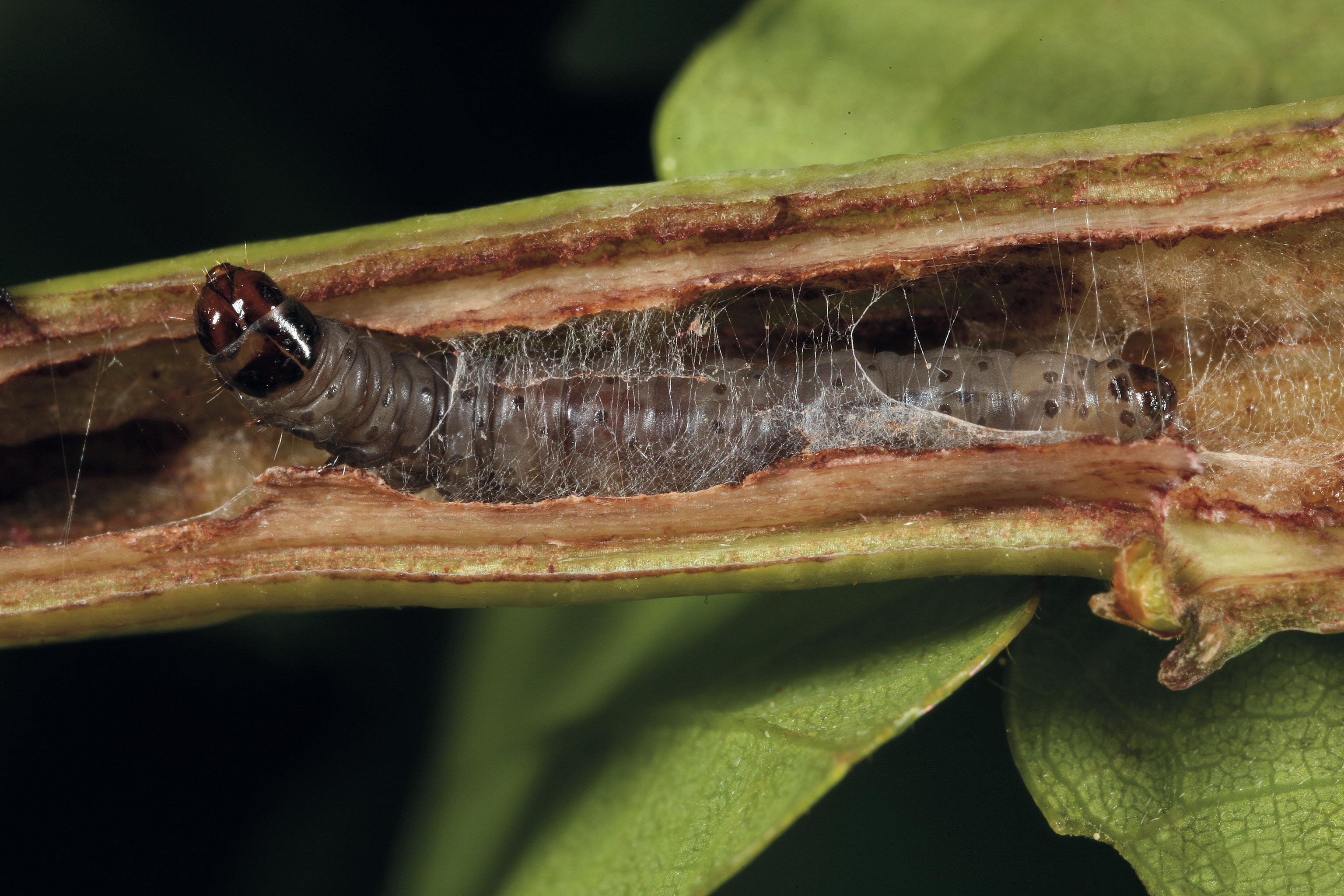
Larva

The wingspan is 14–16 mm. Adults are on wing from June to July in one generation per year.

The larvae feed on Quercus and Corylus species. Feeding results in a gall-like swelling. Pupation takes place after hibernation on the leaves of the food plant.
