= Epinotia notoceliana =

Scientific classification
- Domain: Eukaryota
- Kingdom: Animalia
- Phylum: Arthropoda
- Class: Insecta
- Order: Lepidoptera
- Family: Tortricidae
- Genus: Epinotia
- Species: E. notoceliana

Binomial name
- Epinotia notoceliana Kuznetsov, 1985

Species of moth

Epinotia notoceliana is a species of moth of the family Tortricidae. It is found in China (Hebei) and Russia.
