= Epinotia nigrovenata =

Scientific classification
- Kingdom: Animalia
- Phylum: Arthropoda
- Class: Insecta
- Order: Lepidoptera
- Family: Tortricidae
- Genus: Epinotia
- Species: E. nigrovenata

Binomial name
- Epinotia nigrovenata Razowski & Pelz, 2010

Species of moth

Epinotia nigrovenata is a species of moth of the family Tortricidae. It is found in Chile (Maule, Valparaíso and O'Higgins regions).

The wingspan is 15 mm for males and 16–19 mm for females.

== Etymology ==
The species name refers to the black veins of the hindwings and is derived from Latin niger (meaning black) and venatus (meaning with veins).
