= Epinotia nigristriana =

Scientific classification
- Domain: Eukaryota
- Kingdom: Animalia
- Phylum: Arthropoda
- Class: Insecta
- Order: Lepidoptera
- Family: Tortricidae
- Genus: Epinotia
- Species: E. nigristriana

Binomial name
- Epinotia nigristriana Budashkin & Zlatkov, 2011

Species of moth

Epinotia nigristriana is a moth of the family Tortricidae. It is found in south-western Bulgaria and Greece. The habitat consists of dry, rocky steppes.
