= Epinotia absconditana =

Scientific classification
- Kingdom: Animalia
- Phylum: Arthropoda
- Class: Insecta
- Order: Lepidoptera
- Family: Tortricidae
- Genus: Epinotia
- Species: E. absconditana

Binomial name
- Epinotia absconditana (Walker, 1863)

Synonyms
- Sciaphila absconditana Walker, 1863; Bactra aulacota Turner, 1946; Eucosma perplexa Turner, 1916

Species of moth

Epinotia absconditana is a species of moth of the family Tortricidae. It is found in Australia, where it has been recorded from New South Wales and Queensland.

The wingspan is about 14 mm. The forewings are whitish-brown, strigulated (finely streaked) with brown and fuscous. There is a large basal patch which is darker than the rest of the wing. The hindwings are grey.
