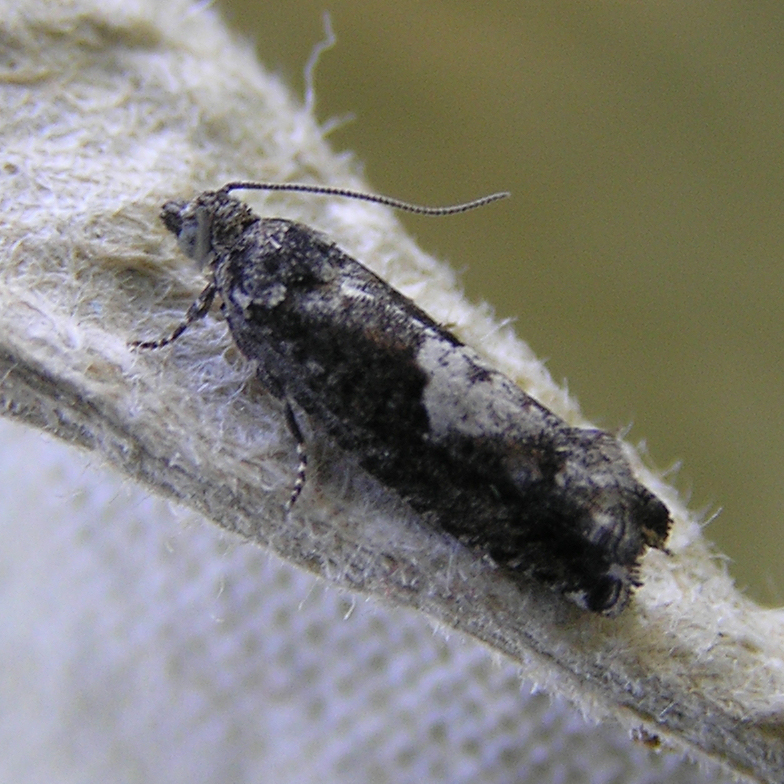

Scientific classification
- Domain: Eukaryota
- Kingdom: Animalia
- Phylum: Arthropoda
- Class: Insecta
- Order: Lepidoptera
- Family: Tortricidae
- Genus: Epinotia
- Species: E. immundana

Binomial name
- Epinotia immundana (Fischer von Röslerstamm, 1839)

Synonyms
- Paedisca immundana Fischer von Röslerstamm, 1839; Phlaeodes estreyerana Guenée, 1845; Grapholitha estreyeriana Lederer, 1859; Epiblema immundana ignalinonis Strand, 1917

= Epinotia immundana =

Species of moth

Epinotia immundana is a moth of the family Tortricidae. It is found in China (Qinghai), Russia and Europe.

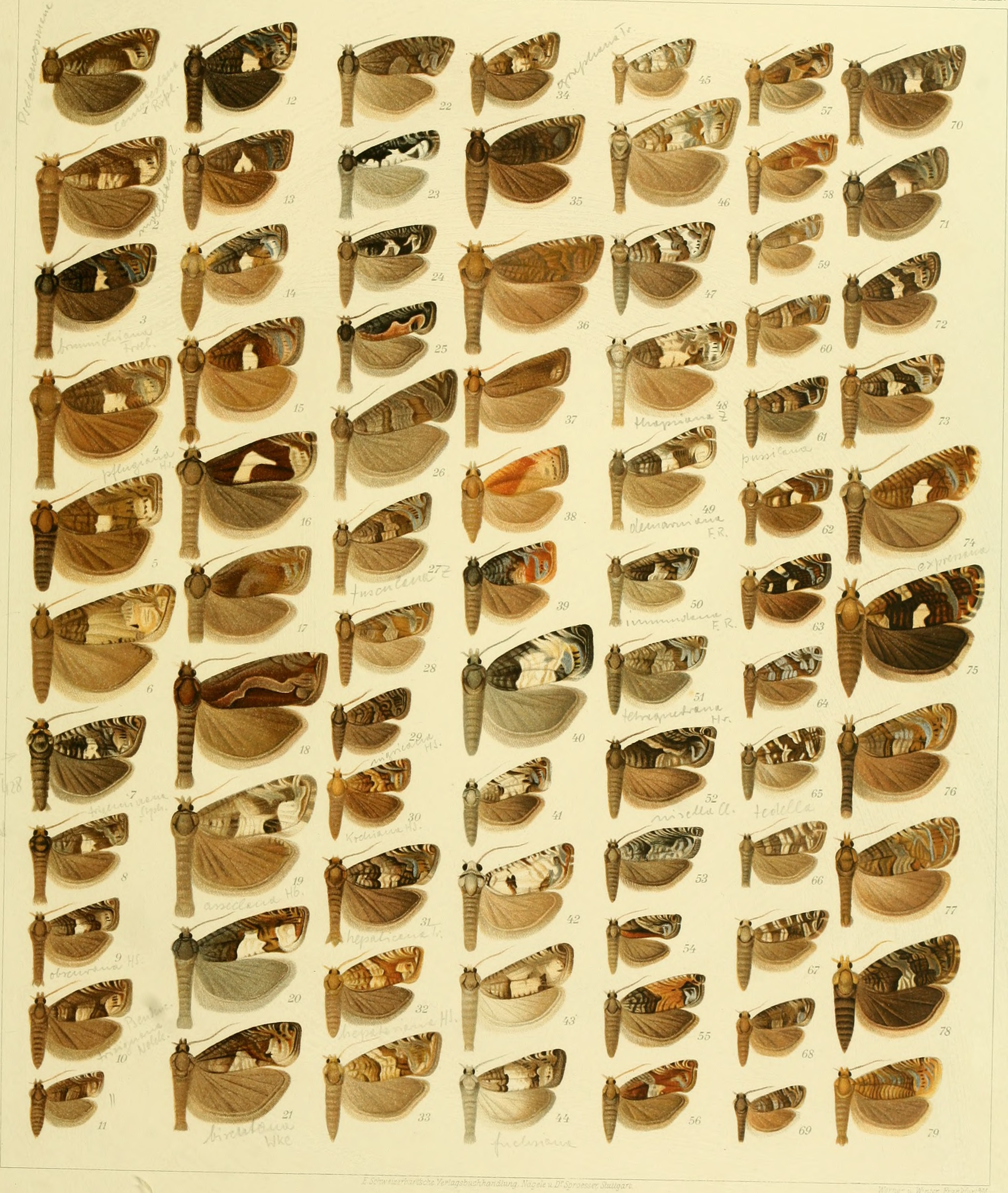
Plate illustrating Epinotia immundana figure 50 and related species.

The wingspan is 12–14 mm. As in many other species of the genus Epinotia, it is fairly variable in colour. Often there is a large, triangular white spot at the dorsal edge of the forewings and a smaller light stain at the tornus. The hindwings are light grey-brown.

In the British Isles and adjoining areas of continental Europe, the moth flies from April to June and again, in the south, in August and September.

The larvae mainly feed on alder Alnus glutinosa, birch and rose.
