= Epinotia fujisawai =

Scientific classification
- Kingdom: Animalia
- Phylum: Arthropoda
- Class: Insecta
- Order: Lepidoptera
- Family: Tortricidae
- Genus: Epinotia
- Species: E. fujisawai

Binomial name
- Epinotia fujisawai Kawabe, 1993

Species of moth

Epinotia fujisawai is a species of moth of the family Tortricidae. It is found in Taiwan.
