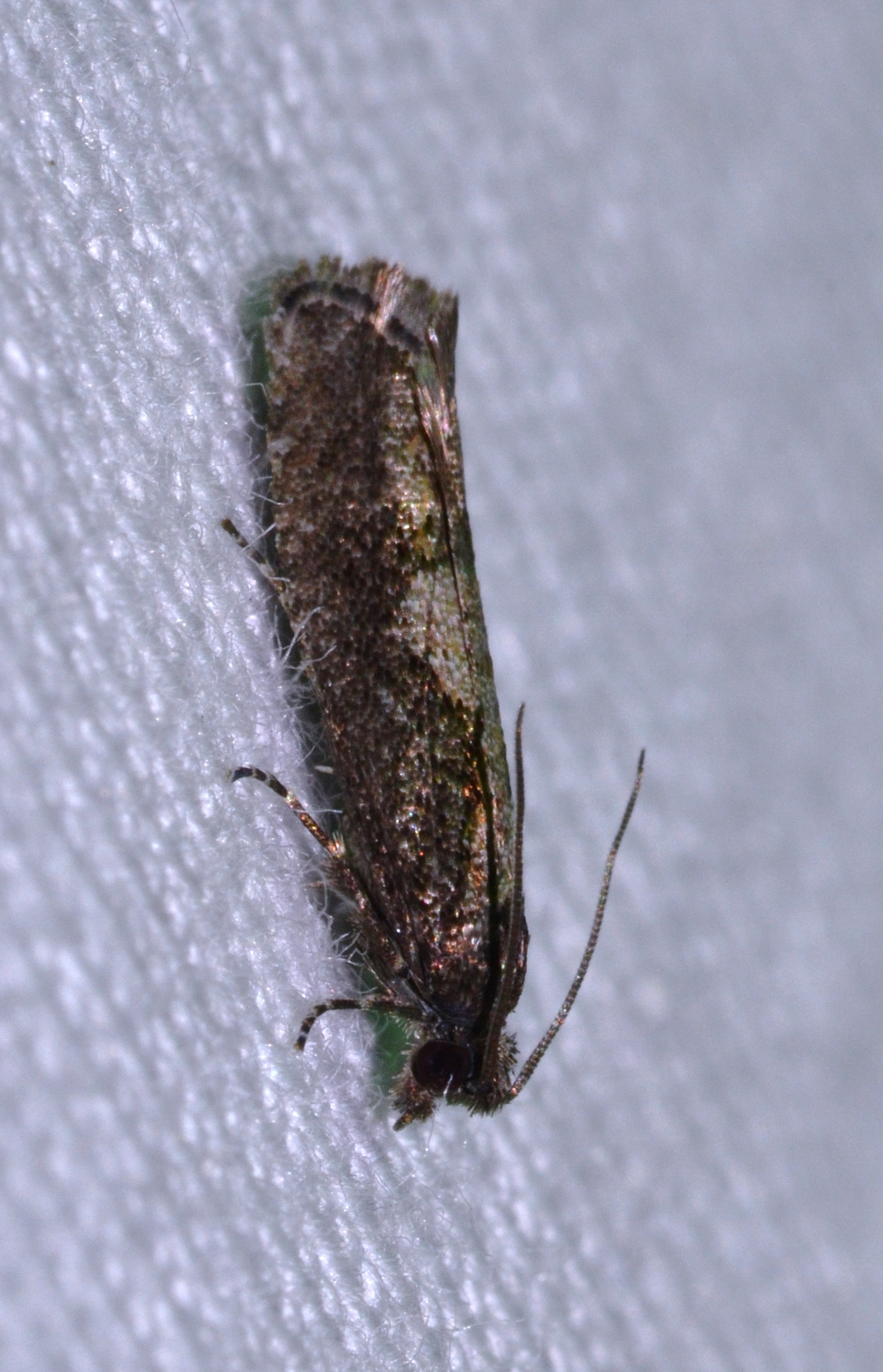

Scientific classification
- Kingdom: Animalia
- Phylum: Arthropoda
- Clade: Pancrustacea
- Class: Insecta
- Order: Lepidoptera
- Family: Tortricidae
- Genus: Epinotia
- Species: E. vertumnana

Binomial name
- Epinotia vertumnana (Zeller, 1875)

Synonyms
- Paedisca vertumnana Zeller, 1875

= Epinotia vertumnana =

Species of moth

Epinotia vertumnana is a species of moth of the family Tortricidae. It is found in North America, where it has been recorded from southern Ontario and Quebec to eastern Pennsylvania, then to Michigan and from there to northern Mississippi and eastern Texas.

The wingspan is about 15 mm. Adults have been recorded on wing from February to July.

The larvae feed on Crataegus and Celtis species.
