= Epinotia abnormana =

Scientific classification
- Domain: Eukaryota
- Kingdom: Animalia
- Phylum: Arthropoda
- Class: Insecta
- Order: Lepidoptera
- Family: Tortricidae
- Genus: Epinotia
- Species: E. abnormana

Binomial name
- Epinotia abnormana Kuznetzov, 1973

Synonyms
- Epinotia (Panoplia) abnormana Kuznetsov, 1973

Species of moth

Epinotia abnormana is a species of moth of the family Tortricidae. It is found in China (Shanxi, Gansu).
