= Epinotia granitalis =

Scientific classification
- Domain: Eukaryota
- Kingdom: Animalia
- Phylum: Arthropoda
- Class: Insecta
- Order: Lepidoptera
- Family: Tortricidae
- Genus: Epinotia
- Species: E. granitalis

Binomial name
- Epinotia granitalis (Butler, 1881)

Species of moth

Epinotia granitalis, the cypress bark moth, is a moth of the family Tortricidae. It is endemic to Japan.

The wingspan is 13–16 mm. Adults are on wing from early June to late July.

The larvae feed on Cryptomeria japonica and Chamaecyparis obtusa.
