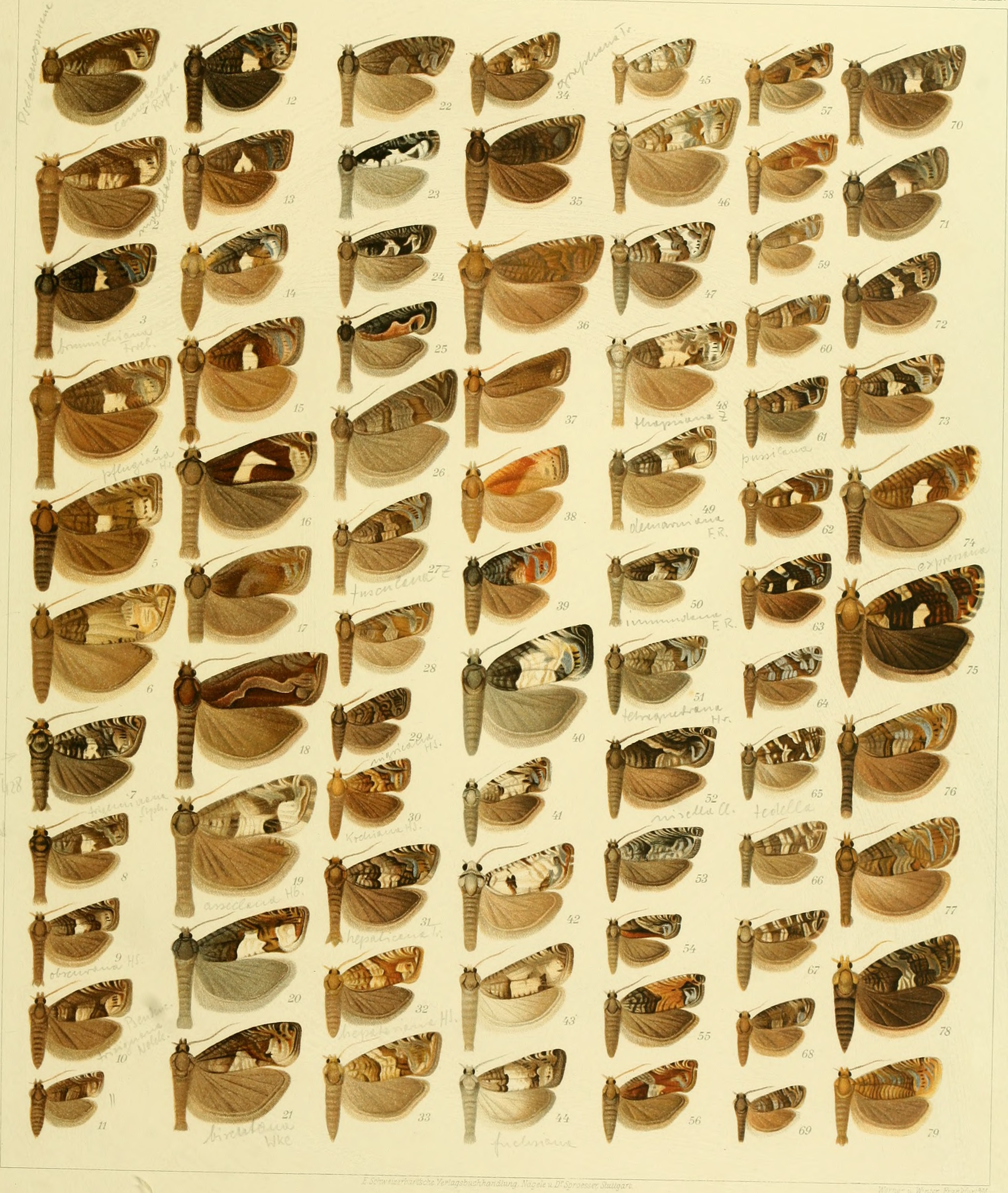
- in Kennel Die palaearktischen tortriciden figure 59

Scientific classification
- Kingdom: Animalia
- Phylum: Arthropoda
- Class: Insecta
- Order: Lepidoptera
- Family: Tortricidae
- Genus: Epinotia
- Species: E. nemorivaga

Binomial name
- Epinotia nemorivaga (Tengstrom, 1848)

Synonyms
- Coccyx nemorivaga Tengstrom, 1848; Grapholitha (Paedisca) finimitana Lederer, 1859; Coccyx finitimana Doubleday, 1859; Coccyx finitimana Stephens, 1852; Coccyx nemorivagana Jones, 1884; rhododendrana Herrich-Schaffer, 1847; Tortrix (Steganoptycha) rhododendrana Herrich-Schaffer, 1851; Epinotia rhododendronana Hartig, 1960

= Epinotia nemorivaga =

Species of moth

Epinotia nemorivaga, the bearberry bell, is a species of moth in the family Tortricidae. It is found in Europe (from Fennoscandia and northern Russia to the Iberian Peninsula and Italy, and from Ireland to Poland) and Asia (China: Henan, Sichuan, Guizhou, Shaanxi).

The wingspan is 10–12 mm. The face and palpi are pale brownish. The forewings are silvery- whitish, finely strigulated with fuscous. The costa is posteriorly strigulated with dark fuscous and white. There are some scattered dark fuscous strigulae. The basal patch with edge somewhat bent, the central fascia with posterior median projection, and an irregular spot touching termen in middle are all dark fuscous. The termen is hardly sinuate. The cilia have a white subapical dash. The hindwings are grey. The larva is pale yellowish; head dark brown.

Adults are on wing in June and July in western Europe.

The larvae feed on Arctostaphylos alpinus and Arctostaphylos uva-ursi. The larvae mine the leaves of their host plant. They can be found from September to May.
