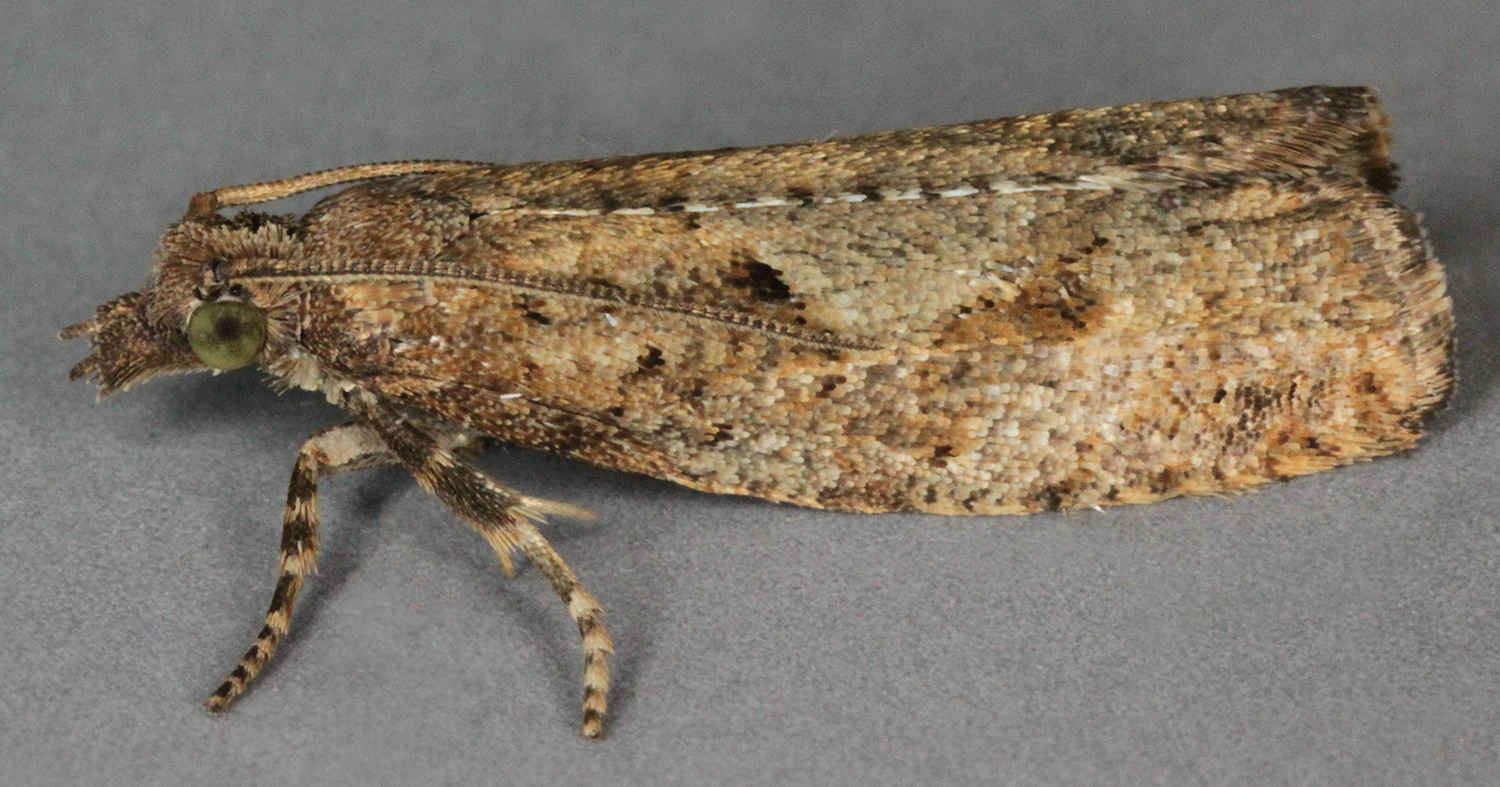
- Epinotia caprana, North Wales
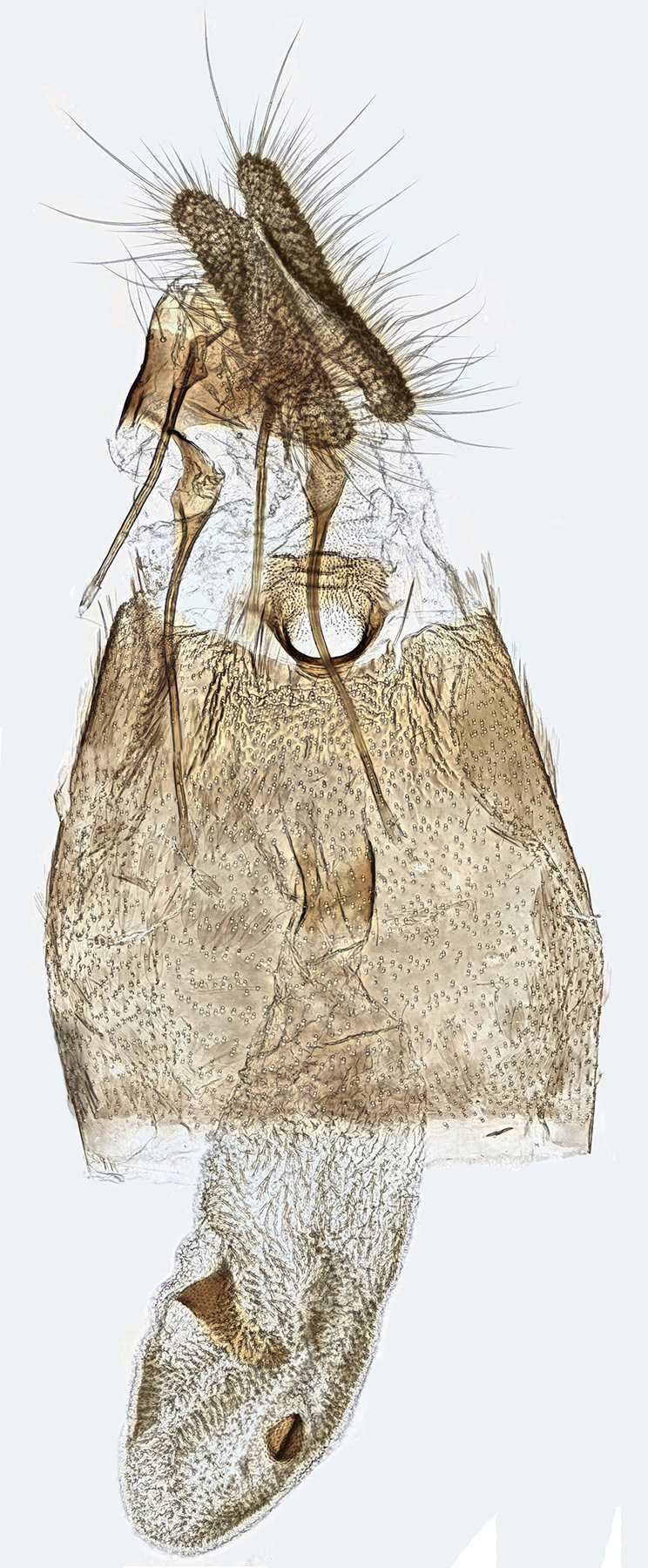
- Male genitalia

Scientific classification
- Domain: Eukaryota
- Kingdom: Animalia
- Phylum: Arthropoda
- Class: Insecta
- Order: Lepidoptera
- Family: Tortricidae
- Genus: Epinotia
- Species: E. caprana

Binomial name
- Epinotia caprana (Fabricius, 1798)

= Epinotia caprana =

Species of moth

Epinotia caprana is a moth belonging to the family Tortricidae. The species was first described by Johan Christian Fabricius in 1798.

The wingspan is 15–22 mm. Like several other species in the genus Epinotia, it is very variable in colour and examination of the genitalia is necessary to determine the species with certainty. Often the forewing is divided longitudinally into a purplish-brown or ferruginous-brown costal 2/3 and a whitish dorsal 1/3.

This species is found mostly in moist places, such as moist deciduous forests and marshes. The larvae develop in rolled-up leaves of willow Salix caprea, Salix spp. and Myrica gale. The moths fly in July-August.

It is native to Europe.
