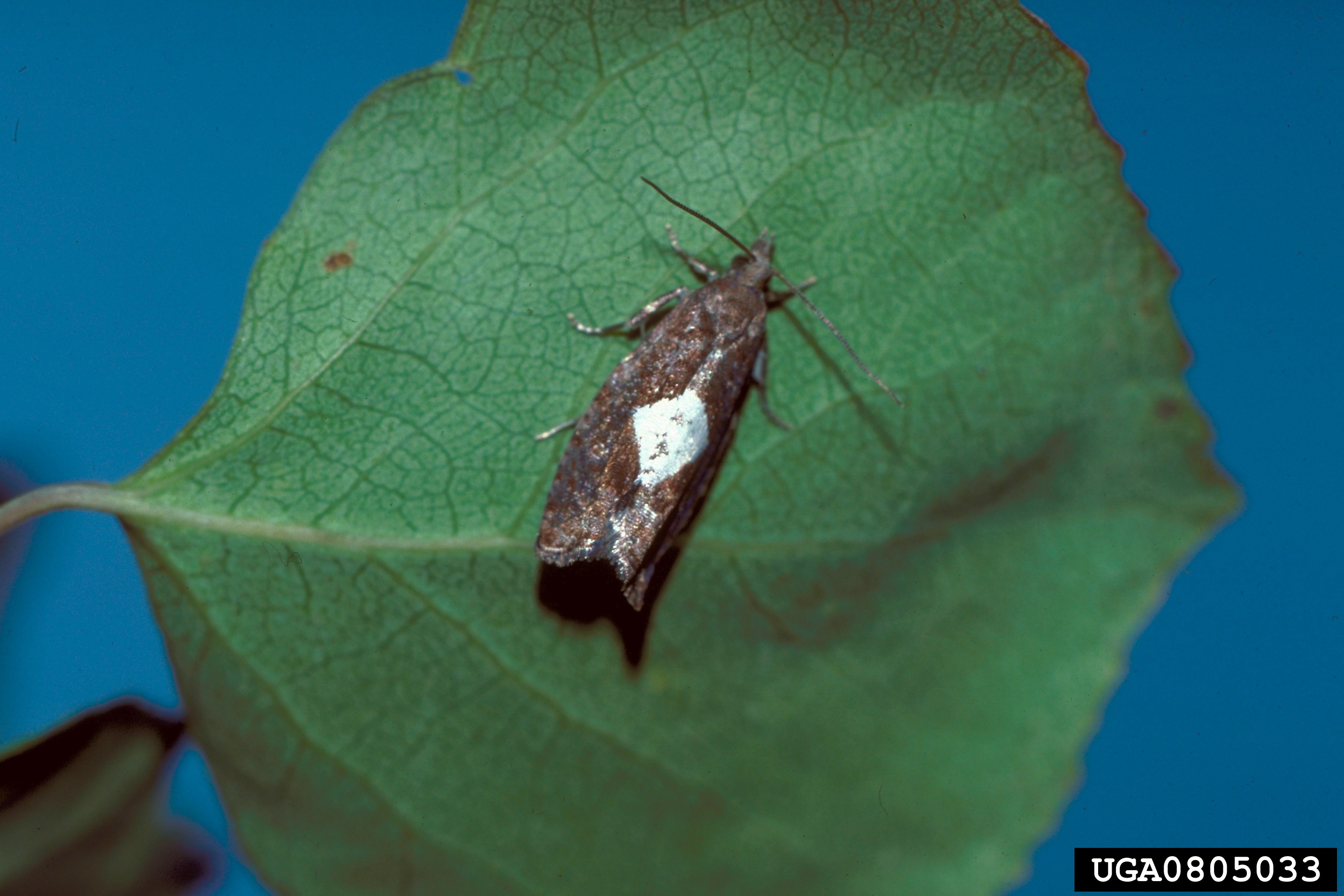
- Adult Epinotia solandriana

Scientific classification
- Kingdom: Animalia
- Phylum: Arthropoda
- Clade: Pancrustacea
- Class: Insecta
- Order: Lepidoptera
- Family: Tortricidae
- Tribe: Eucosmini
- Genus: Epinotia; Hübner, [1825]

Type species
- Phalaena similana Hübner, 1793

Diversity
- 166 species

Synonyms
- Numerous, see text

= Epinotia =

Genus of tortrix moths

Epinotia is a very large genus of tortrix moths (family Tortricidae). It belongs to the tribe Eucosmini of subfamily Olethreutinae.

== Species ==
166 species of Epinotia were considered valid as of 2009. Though many tortrix moth genera are fairly comprehensively studied, with little other than cryptic species complexes remaining undiscovered, distinct new species of Epinotia are being described every few years or so. With such a large and insufficiently known taxon, it is of course possible that the group may not be monophyletic as circumscribed here:

- Epinotia abbreviana (Fabricius, 1794)
- Epinotia abnormana Kuznetzov, 1973
- Epinotia absconditana (Walker, 1863)
- Epinotia aciculana Falkovitsh, 1965
- Epinotia albangulana (Walsingham, 1879)
- Epinotia albicapitana (Kearfott, 1907)
- Epinotia albiguttata (Oku, 1974)
- Epinotia algeriensis Chambon in Chambon, Fabre & Khemeci, 1990
- Epinotia aquila Kuznetzov, 1968
- Epinotia araea Diakonoff, 1983
- Epinotia arctostaphylana (Kearfott, 1904)
- Epinotia aridos Freeman, 1960
- Epinotia atacta Diakonoff, 1992
- Epinotia autonoma Falkovitsh, 1965
- Epinotia autumnalis Oku, 2005
- Epinotia balsameae Freeman, 1965
- Epinotia biangulana (Walsingham, 1879)
- Epinotia bicolor (Walsingham, 1900)
- Epinotia bicordana Heinrich, 1923
- Epinotia bigemina Heinrich, 1923
- Epinotia bilunana
- Epinotia bricelus Diakonoff, 1992
- Epinotia brunnichana
- Epinotia bushiensis Kawabe, 1980
- Epinotia canthonias (Meyrick, 1920)
- Epinotia caprana (Fabricius, 1798)
- Epinotia castaneana (Walsingham, 1895)
- Epinotia cedricida Diakonoff, 1969
- Epinotia celtisana (Riley, 1881)
- Epinotia cercocarpana (Dyar, 1903)
- Epinotia chloana Razowski & Wojtusiak, 2006
- Epinotia chloizans Razowski & Wojtusiak, 2006
- Epinotia cineracea Nasu, 1991
- Epinotia clasta Diakonoff, 1983
- Epinotia columbia (Kearfott, 1904)
- Epinotia contrariana (Christoph, 1882)
- Epinotia corylana McDunnough, 1925
- Epinotia coryli Kuznetzov, 1970
- Epinotia crenana (Hübner, [1817])
- Epinotia criddleana (Kearfott, 1907)
- Epinotia cruciana – willow tortrix
- Epinotia cuphulana (Herrich-Schäffer, 1851)
- Epinotia dalmatana (Rebel, 1891)
- Epinotia demarniana
- Epinotia densiuncaria Kuznetzov, 1985
- Epinotia deruptana Kennel, 1901
- Epinotia digitana Heinrich, 1923
- Epinotia dorsifraga Diakonoff, 1970
- Epinotia emarginana (Walsingham, 1879)
- Epinotia ethnica Heinrich, 1923
- Epinotia evidens Kuznetzov, 1971
- Epinotia exquisitana (Christoph, 1882)
- Epinotia festivana (Hübner, [1799])
- Epinotia fraternana (Haworth, [1811])
- Epinotia fujisawai Kawabe, 1993
- Epinotia fumoviridana Heinrich, 1923
- Epinotia gimmerthaliana (Lienig & Zeller, 1846)
- Epinotia granitana (Herrich-Schäffer, 1851)
- Epinotia granitalis (Butler, 1881)
- Epinotia hamptonana (Kearfott, 1875)
- Epinotia hesperidana Kennel, 1921
- Epinotia heucherana Heinrich, 1923
- Epinotia hopkinsana (Kearfott, 1907)
- Epinotia huroniensis Brown, 1980
- Epinotia hypsidryas (Meyrick, 1925)
- Epinotia illepidosa (Razowski & Wojtusiak, 2006)
- Epinotia immaculata Peiu & Nemes, 1968
- Epinotia immundana
- Epinotia improvisana Heinrich, 1923
- Epinotia infessana (Walsingham, 1900)
- Epinotia infuscana (Walsingham, 1879)
- Epinotia intermissa (Meyrick, 1931)
- Epinotia javierana Razowski & Pelz, 2007
- Epinotia johnsonana (Kearfott, 1907)
- Epinotia kasloana McDunnough, 1925
- Epinotia keiferana Lange, 1937
- Epinotia ketamana (Amsel, 1956)
- Epinotia kochiana (Herrich-Schäffer, 1851)
- Epinotia lanceata Razowski, 1999
- Epinotia lindana – diamondback epinotia moth
- Epinotia lomonana (Kearfott, 1907)
- Epinotia maculana
- Epinotia madderana (Kearfott, 1907)
- Epinotia majorana (Caradja, 1916)
- Epinotia medioplagata (Walsingham, 1895)
- Epinotia medioviridana (Kearfott, 1908)
- Epinotia melanosticta (Wileman & Stringer, 1929)
- Epinotia mercuriana
- Epinotia meritana Heinrich, 1923
- Epinotia miscana (Kearfott, 1907)
- Epinotia mniara Diakonoff, 1992
- Epinotia momonana (Kearfott, 1907)
- Epinotia monticola Kawabe, 1993
- Epinotia myricana McDunnough, 1933
- Epinotia nanana
- Epinotia nemorivaga (Tengstrom, 1848)
- Epinotia nigralbana (Walsingham, 1879)
- Epinotia nigralbanoidana McDunnough, 1929
- Epinotia nigricana (Herrich-Schäffer, 1851)
- Epinotia nigristriana Budashkin & Zlatkov, 2011
- Epinotia nigrovenata Razowski & Pelz, 2010
- Epinotia nisella (Clerck, 1759)
- Epinotia niveipalpa Razowski, 2009
- Epinotia nonana (Kearfott, 1907)
- Epinotia normanana Kearfott, 1907
- Epinotia notoceliana Kuznetzov, 1985
- Epinotia parki Bae, 1997
- Epinotia pentagonana Kennel, 1901
- Epinotia penthrana Bradley, 1965
- Epinotia phyloeorrhages Diakonoff, 1970
- Epinotia piceae (Issiki in Issiki & Mutuura, 1961)
- Epinotia piceicola Kuznetzov, 1970
- Epinotia pinicola Kuznetzov, 1969
- Epinotia plumbolineana Kearfott, 1907
- Epinotia pullata (Falkovitsh in Danilevsky, Kuznetsov & Falkovitsh, 1962)
- Epinotia pulsatillana (Dyar, 1903)
- Epinotia purpuriciliana (Walsingham, 1879)
- Epinotia pusillana
- Epinotia pygmaeana – pygmy needle tortricid
- Epinotia radicana (Heinrich, 1923)
- Epinotia ramella
- Epinotia rasdolnyana (Christoph, 1882)
- Epinotia rectiplicana (Walsingham, 1879)
- Epinotia removana McDunnough, 1935
- Epinotia rubiginosana
- Epinotia rubricana Kuznetzov, 1968
- Epinotia ruidosana Heinrich, 1923
- Epinotia sagittana McDunnough, 1925
- Epinotia salicicolana Kuznetzov, 1968
- Epinotia seorsa Heinrich, 1924
- Epinotia septemberana Kearfott, 1907
- Epinotia signatana
- Epinotia signiferana Heinrich, 1923
- Epinotia silvertoniensis Heinrich, 1923
- Epinotia slovacica Patocka & Jaro, 1991
- Epinotia solandriana
- Epinotia solicitana (Walker, 1863)
- Epinotia sordidana
- Epinotia sotipena Brown, 1987
- Epinotia sperana McDunnough, 1935
- Epinotia subocellana (Donovan, [1806])
- Epinotia subplicana (Walsingham, 1879)
- Epinotia subsequana (Haworth, [1811])
- Epinotia subuculana Rebel, 1903
- Epinotia subviridis Heinrich, 1929
- Epinotia tedella
- Epinotia tenebrica Razowski & Wojtusiak, 2006
- Epinotia tenerana
- Epinotia terracoctana (Walsingham, 1879)
- Epinotia tetraquetrana (Haworth, [1811])
- Epinotia thaiensis Kawabe, 1995
- Epinotia thapsiana (Zeller, 1847)
- Epinotia tianshanensis Liu & Nasu, 1993
- Epinotia transmissana (Walker, 1863)
- Epinotia trigonella (Linnaeus, 1758)
- Epinotia trossulana (Walsingham, 1879)
- Epinotia tsugana Freeman, 1967
- Epinotia tsurugisana Oku, 2005
- Epinotia ulmi Kuznetzov, 1966
- Epinotia ulmicola Kuznetzov, 1966
- Epinotia unisignana Kuznetzov, 1962
- Epinotia vagana Heinrich, 1923
- Epinotia vertumnana (Zeller, 1875)
- Epinotia vorana (Strand, 1920)
- Epinotia walkerana (Kearfott, 1907)
- Epinotia xandana (Kearfott, 1907)
- Epinotia xyloryctoides Diakonoff, 1992
- Epinotia yoshiyasui Kawabe, 1989
- Epinotia zamorata Razowski, 1999
- Epinotia zandana (Kearfott, 1907)

== Synonyms ==
In particular during the early to mid-19th century, when little of the diversity of Epinotia was known, it was split into many smaller genera. Today however, these are generally – but not universally, e.g. regarding the supposedly monotypic Griselda, or Catastega which is here considered separate but included in Epinotia elsewhere (Note: See e.g. the references in Savela (2005, 2009)) – included here again at least pending a thorough taxonomic review. Now-invalid scientific names (junior synonyms and others) of Epinotia are:

- Acalla Hübner, [1825]
- Astatia Hübner, 1825
- Asthenia Hübner, 1825
- Cartella Stephens, 1852
- Ccalla (lapsus)
- Curtella (lapsus)
- Epinotis (lapsus)
- Evertia (lapsus)
- Evetria Hübner, 1825
- Griselda Heinrich, 1923
- Hamuligera Obraztsov, 1946
- Hikagehamakia Oku, 1974
- Hypermecia Guenée, 1845
- Lithographia Stephens, 1852
- Neurasthenia Pierce & Metcalf, 1922
- Paedisca Treitschke, 1830
- Pamplasia (lapsus)
- Pamplusia Guenée, 1845
- Panoplia Hübner, 1825
- Paragrapha Sodoffsky, 1837
- Phlaeodes Guenée, 1845
- Phloeodes (lapsus)
- Podisca (lapsus)
- Poecilochroma Stephens, 1829
- Proteopteryx Walsingham, 1879
- Steganoptera (lapsus)
- Steganoptica (lapsus)
- Steganoptycha Stephens, 1834

Halonota has also been listed as junior synonym of Epinotia. But its type species Pyralis populana is today placed in Pammene, and thus Halonota is a junior subjective synonym of the latter genus.
