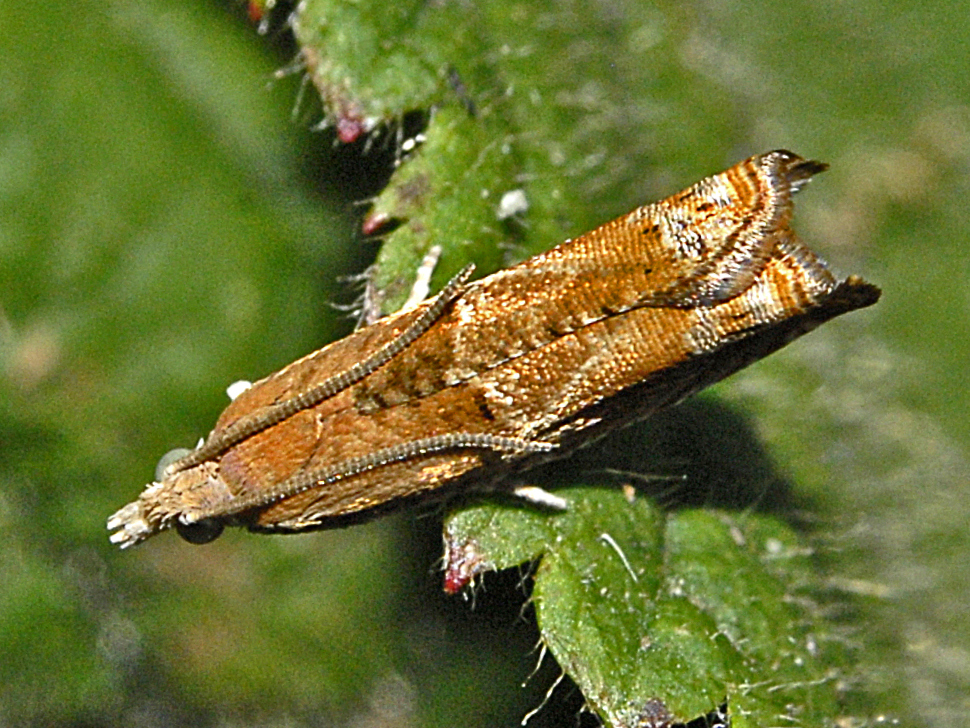

Scientific classification
- Kingdom: Animalia
- Phylum: Arthropoda
- Clade: Pancrustacea
- Class: Insecta
- Order: Lepidoptera
- Family: Tortricidae
- Genus: Epinotia
- Species: E. tenerana

Binomial name
- Epinotia tenerana (Denis and Schiffermüller, 1775)

Synonyms
- List: Tortrix tenerana [Denis & Schiffermuller], 1775; Paedisca penkleriana f. aurantiana Strand, 1901; Mixodia errana Guenee, 1845; Paedisca penkleriana f. fasciatana Strand, 1901; Grapholitha oblitana Duponchel, in Godart, 1842; Tortrix retusana Haworth, [1811]; Tortrix roseolana Frolich, 1828; Epinotia temerana Issekutz, 1972; Tortrix tergorana Frolich, 1828; Epiblema penkleriana ab. unicolorana Schawerda, 1922

= Epinotia tenerana =

Species of moth

Epinotia tenerana, the nut bud moth or alder tortricid, is a moth of the family Tortricidae.

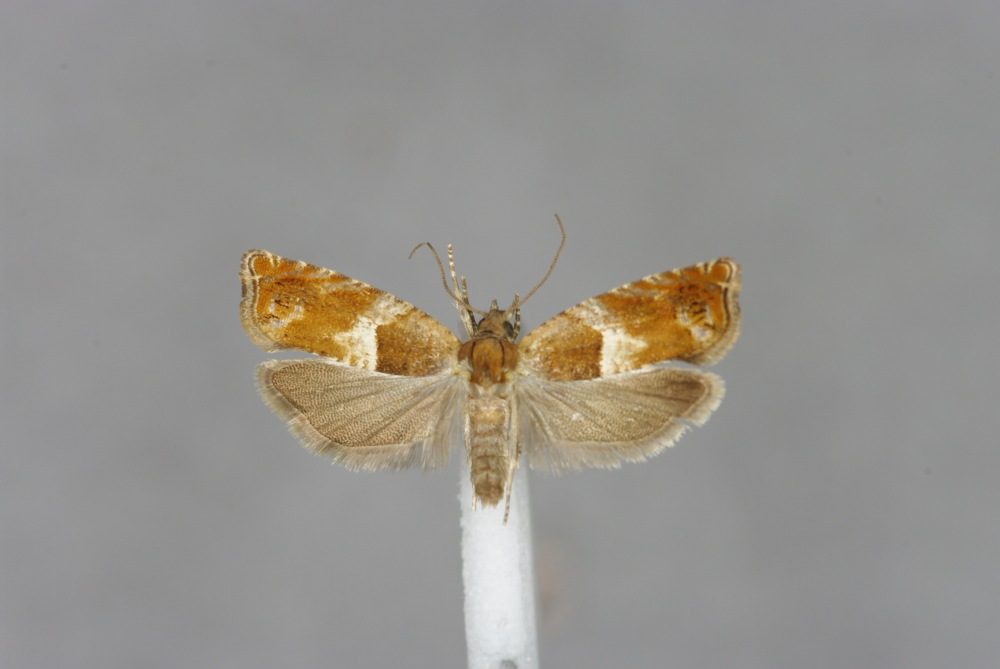
Mounted specimen

== Subspecies ==
Subspecies include:

- Epinotia tenerana tenerana (Korea, Japan, Russia, western Europe, China: Jilin, Heilongjiang)
- Epinotia tenerana amurensis Kuznetzov, 1968 (Russia: Amur region)
- Epinotia tenerana kurilensis Kuznetzov, 1968 (Japan, Russia, China: Jilin)
- Epinotia tenerana ussurica Kuznetzov, 1968 (Russian Far East)

== Distribution ==
This species can be found in most of Europe, in the Near East and in the eastern Palearctic realm (eastern Russia, China, Korea, and Japan).

== Habitat ==
These moths inhabit woodland, freshwater margins and damp areas.

== Description ==
The wingspan of Epinotia tenerana ranges between 12–16 mm. These small moths are very variable in color. The basic color of the forewings is usually brown, ferruginous or reddish brown, with a light crossband in the middle and a bright area at the apex.

This species is rather similar to Ancylis mitterbacheriana.

== Biology ==
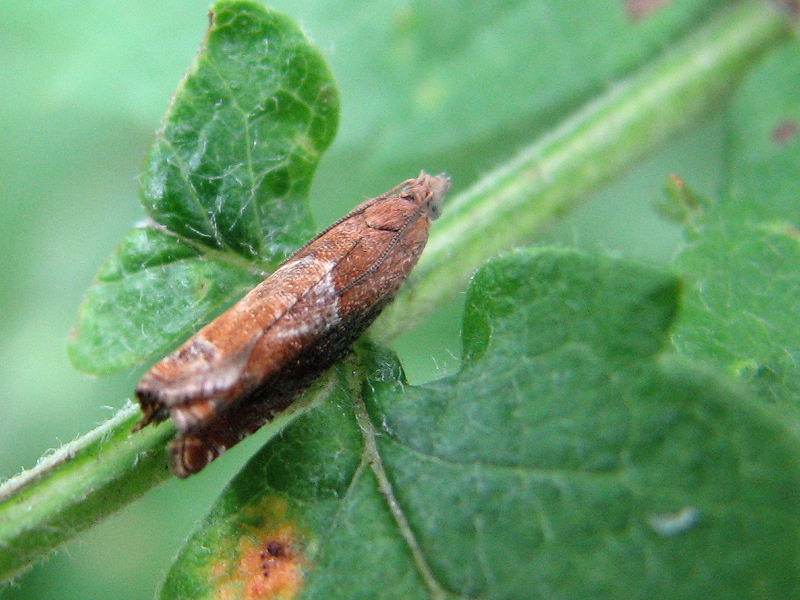
Epinotia tenerana

Adults are on wing from July to September or early October in the UK. They fly from dusk onwards. During the day they usually rest on the foliage of the host plants.

There are two generations in the Netherlands, with adults on wing from May to June and in August. In Poland, adults are recorded to fly from June to August or September.

The larvae feed on Corylus avellana and Alnus glutinosa, but also Betula and in rare cases even Quercus.
