= Epinotia tianshanensis =

Scientific classification
- Domain: Eukaryota
- Kingdom: Animalia
- Phylum: Arthropoda
- Class: Insecta
- Order: Lepidoptera
- Family: Tortricidae
- Genus: Epinotia
- Species: E. tianshanensis

Binomial name
- Epinotia tianshanensis Liu & Nasu, 1993

Species of moth

Epinotia tianshanensis is a species of moth of the family Tortricidae. It is found in Xinjiang, China.

The larvae feed on Picea schrenkiana.
