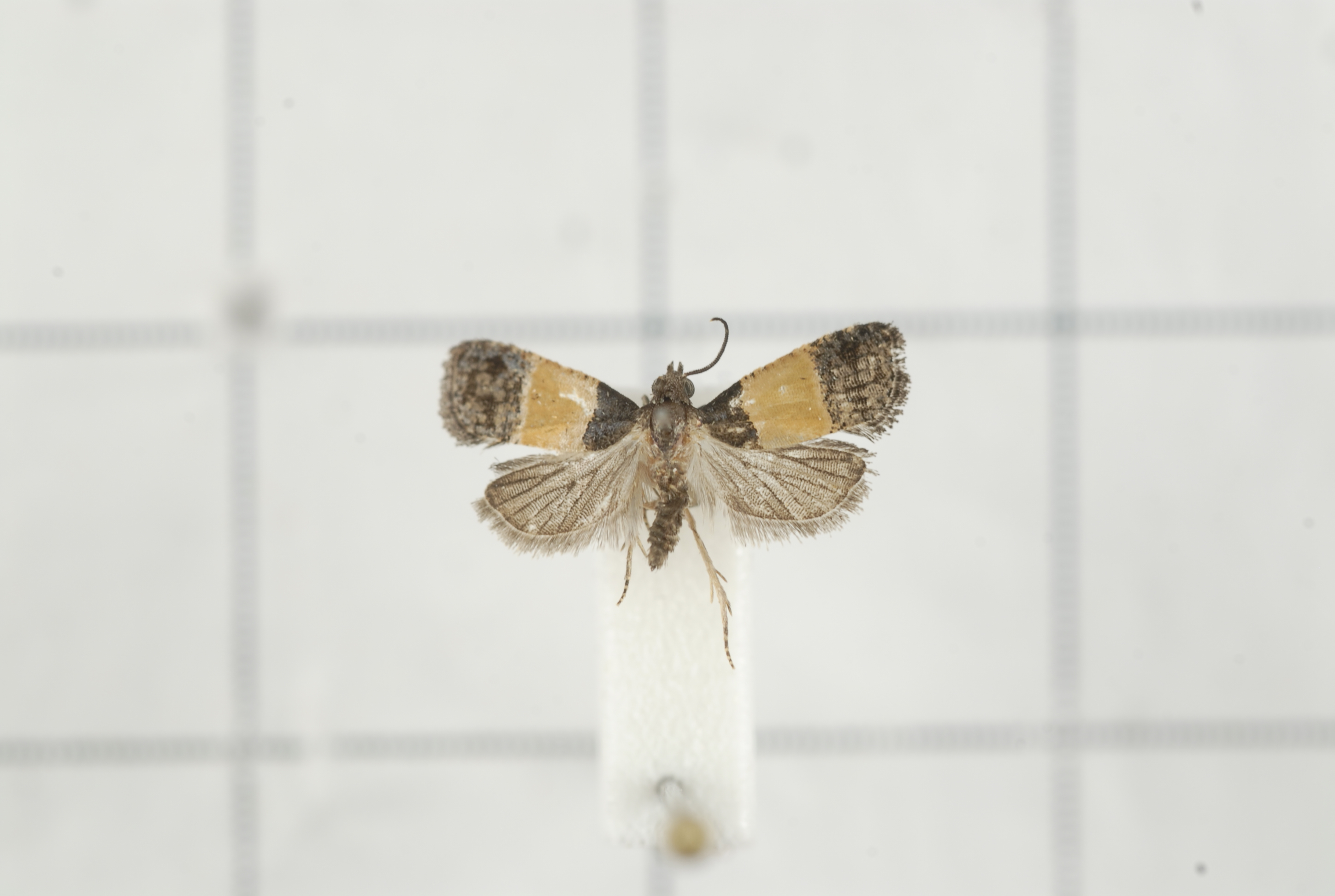

Scientific classification
- Domain: Eukaryota
- Kingdom: Animalia
- Phylum: Arthropoda
- Class: Insecta
- Order: Lepidoptera
- Family: Tortricidae
- Genus: Epinotia
- Species: E. bicolor

Binomial name
- Epinotia bicolor (Walsingham, 1900)

Synonyms
- Pelatea bicolor Walsingham, 1900

= Epinotia bicolor =

Species of moth

Epinotia bicolor is a species of moth of the family Tortricidae. It is found in China (Tianjin, Hebei, Fujian, Henan, Hubei, Hunan, Sichuan, Guizhou, Shaanxi, Gansu), Taiwan, Korea, Japan, Vietnam and India.

The wingspan is 11–14 mm.

The larvae feed on Quercus serrata, Quercus glauca, Quercus phillyreoides and Quercus acutissima.
