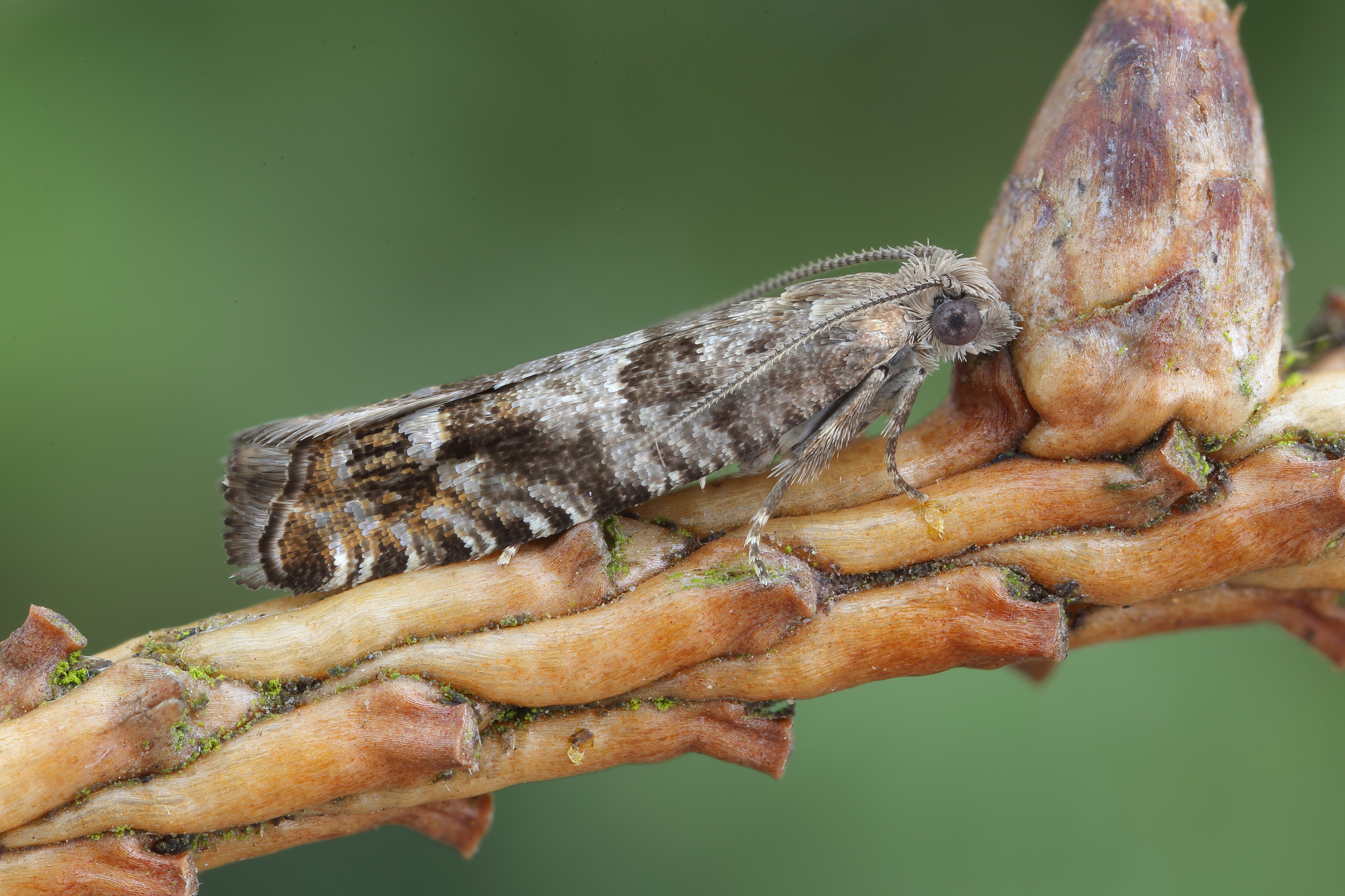

Scientific classification
- Kingdom: Animalia
- Phylum: Arthropoda
- Class: Insecta
- Order: Lepidoptera
- Family: Tortricidae
- Genus: Epinotia
- Species: E. subsequana

Binomial name
- Epinotia subsequana (Haworth, 1811)

= Epinotia subsequana =

Species of moth

Epinotia subsequana, also known as the dark spruce moth, is a species of moth belonging to the family Tortricidae. It was described by the English entomologist, Adrian Hardy Haworth in 1811 and is native to Europe.

== Description ==
The forewings are fuscous, posteriorly ferruginous tinged. The costa is strigulated with whitish and dark fuscous. The basal patch has an obtusely angulated edge, and the central fascia is dilated in disc. Both are mixed with dark fuscous. The ocellus is edged with leaden metallic, including several black dashes. The hindwings are white base with the veins, termen, and an apical patch grey. The larva is yellowish green; head and plate of 2 black.

The larvae mine the needles of conifers, including silver fir (Abies alba), grand fir (Abies grandis) and Norway spruce (Picea abies).
