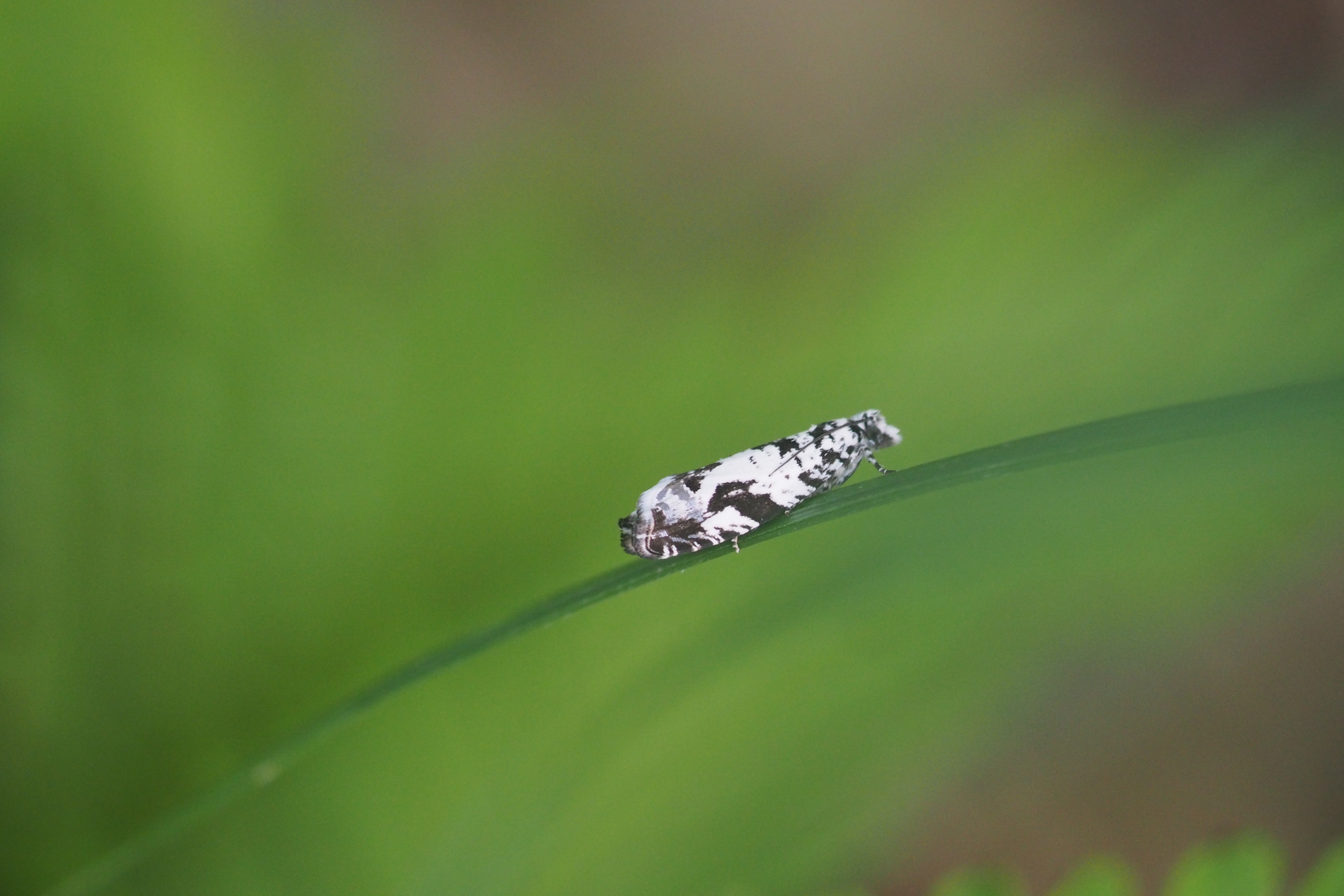

Scientific classification
- Domain: Eukaryota
- Kingdom: Animalia
- Phylum: Arthropoda
- Class: Insecta
- Order: Lepidoptera
- Family: Tortricidae
- Genus: Epinotia
- Species: E. exquisitana

Binomial name
- Epinotia exquisitana (Christoph, 1882)

Synonyms
- Steganoptycha exquisitana Christoph, 1882; Eucosma pica Walsingham, 1900

= Epinotia exquisitana =

Species of moth

Epinotia exquisitana is a species of moth of the family Tortricidae. It is found in China, Korea, Japan and Russia.

The wingspan is 16–19 mm.

The larvae feed on Malus manshurica, Malus sachalinensis, Cerasus maximowiczii, Cerasus kurilensis, Cerasus sachalinensis, Sorbus commixta and Padus ssiori.
