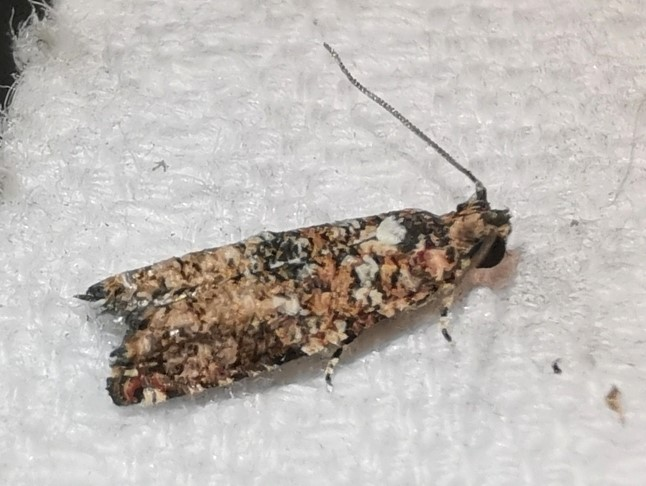

Scientific classification
- Kingdom: Animalia
- Phylum: Arthropoda
- Class: Insecta
- Order: Lepidoptera
- Family: Tortricidae
- Genus: Epinotia
- Species: E. canthonias

Binomial name
- Epinotia canthonias (Meyrick, 1920)

Synonyms
- Acroclita canthonias Meyrick, 1920; Epinotia canthonias Diakonoff, 1982

= Epinotia canthonias =

Species of moth

Epinotia canthonias is a species of moth in the family Tortricidae that was first described by Edward Meyrick in 1920. It is found in Sri Lanka and the Bengal region of India.

Larval food plants are Ficus glomerata and the leaves, flowers and shoots of Loranthus species.
