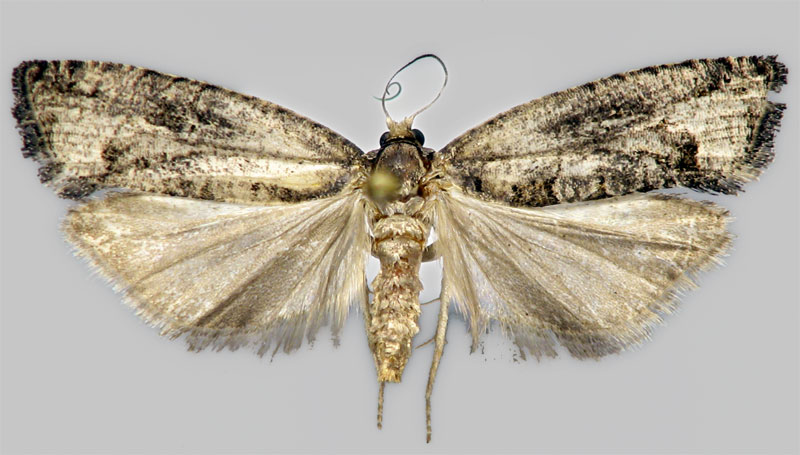

Scientific classification
- Domain: Eukaryota
- Kingdom: Animalia
- Phylum: Arthropoda
- Class: Insecta
- Order: Lepidoptera
- Family: Tortricidae
- Genus: Epinotia
- Species: E. maculana

Binomial name
- Epinotia maculana (Fabricius, 1775)

Synonyms
- Pyralis maculana Fabricius, 1775; Tortrix ophtalmicana Hubner, [1796-1799]; Tortrix ophthalmana Frolich, 1828; Eutrachia ophthalmicana Hubner, 1822

= Epinotia maculana =

Species of moth

Epinotia maculana is a moth of the family Tortricidae. It is found in most of Europe (except Iceland, the Iberian Peninsula, Ukraine, and most of the Balkan Peninsula), east to the eastern part of the Palearctic realm.

The wingspan is 17–23 mm. The forewings are ashy-grey, with the basal portion dark and nebulose, and the apical part waved with slender black streaks, towards the inner margin before the middle is an obscure black dot, and a larger red-brown one towards the anal angle, but nearly obsolete. The hind wings are brown and shining. Adults are on wing from August to October.

The larvae feed on Populus tremula and possibly other Populus species. They feed within rolled leaves.
