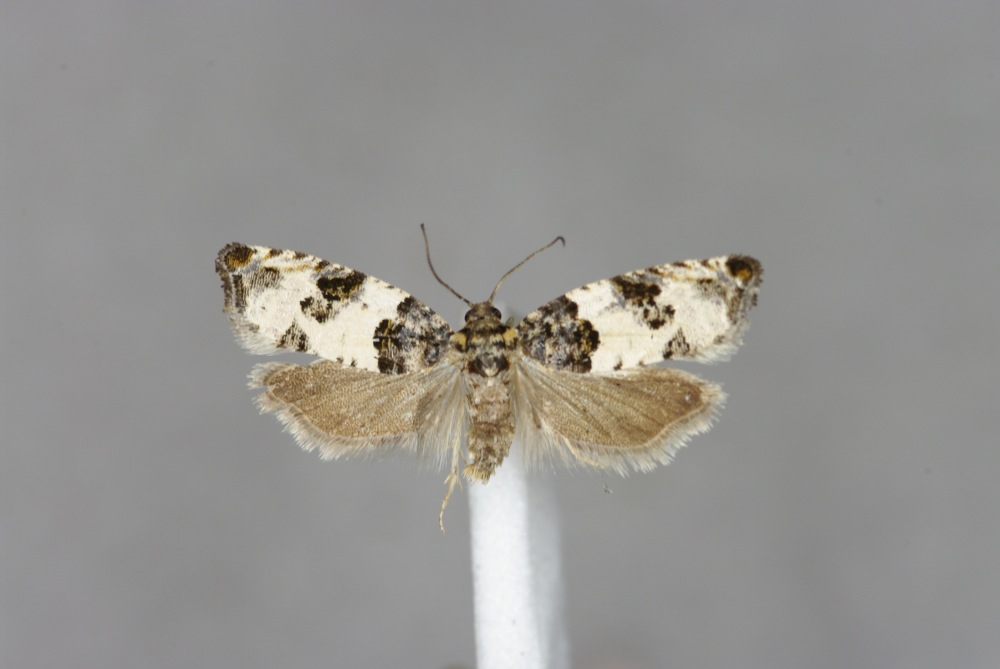

Scientific classification
- Kingdom: Animalia
- Phylum: Arthropoda
- Clade: Pancrustacea
- Class: Insecta
- Order: Lepidoptera
- Family: Tortricidae
- Genus: Epinotia
- Species: E. thapsiana

Binomial name
- Epinotia thapsiana (Zeller, 1847)

Synonyms
- Penthina thapsiana Zeller, 1847

= Epinotia thapsiana =

Species of moth

Epinotia thapsiana is a moth of the family Tortricidae. It was described by Philipp Christoph Zeller in 1847. It is found in the Netherlands, France, Spain, Portugal, Switzerland, Austria, Italy, Slovakia, Hungary, Slovenia, Serbia, North Macedonia, Albania, Greece, Russia, Asia Minor, Iran, Kyrgyzstan, Tajikistan, Turkmenistan, China (Tianjin, Zhejiang, Anhui, Guizhou, Shaanxi) and Korea.

The wingspan is 13–16 mm. Adults are on wing from May to June and again from July to August in two generations per year.

The larvae feed on various herbaceous plants, including Thapsia, Ferrula, Crithmum, Ligustrum, Laserpitium and Foeniculum species.
