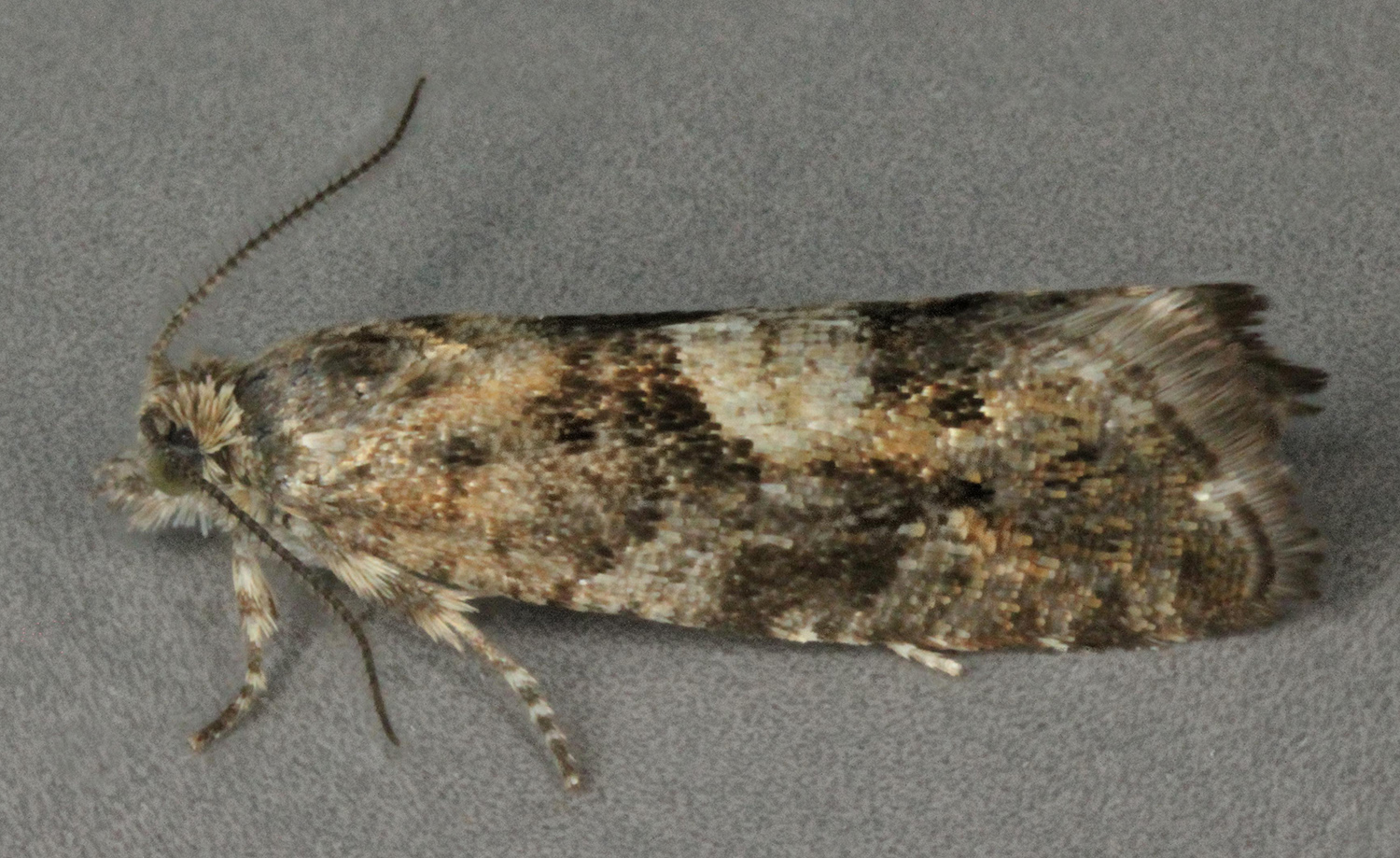

Scientific classification
- Kingdom: Animalia
- Phylum: Arthropoda
- Clade: Pancrustacea
- Class: Insecta
- Order: Lepidoptera
- Family: Tortricidae
- Genus: Epinotia
- Species: E. pygmaeana

Binomial name
- Epinotia pygmaeana (Hübner, [1799])

= Epinotia pygmaeana =

Species of moth

Epinotia pygmaeana, the pygmy needle tortricid, is a moth of the family Tortricidae. It is found across the Palearctic from northern and central Europe to eastern Russia.

The wingspan is 12–14 mm. The forewings are fuscous, whitish-sprinkled, costa spotted with dark fuscous; basal patch with edge sharply angulated, and central fascia darker, space between them forming a subquadrate more whitish dorsal spot; ocellus large, broadly edged with leaden-metallic. Hindwings are white; apical third fuscous, darker terminally. The larva is green; spots black; head and plate of 2 black.

Adults are on wing from late March to early June.

The larvae feed on Picea abies, Picea excelsa, Picea sitchensis and Abies alba. The larvae mine and later spin the needles of their host, causing a decrease in growth.
