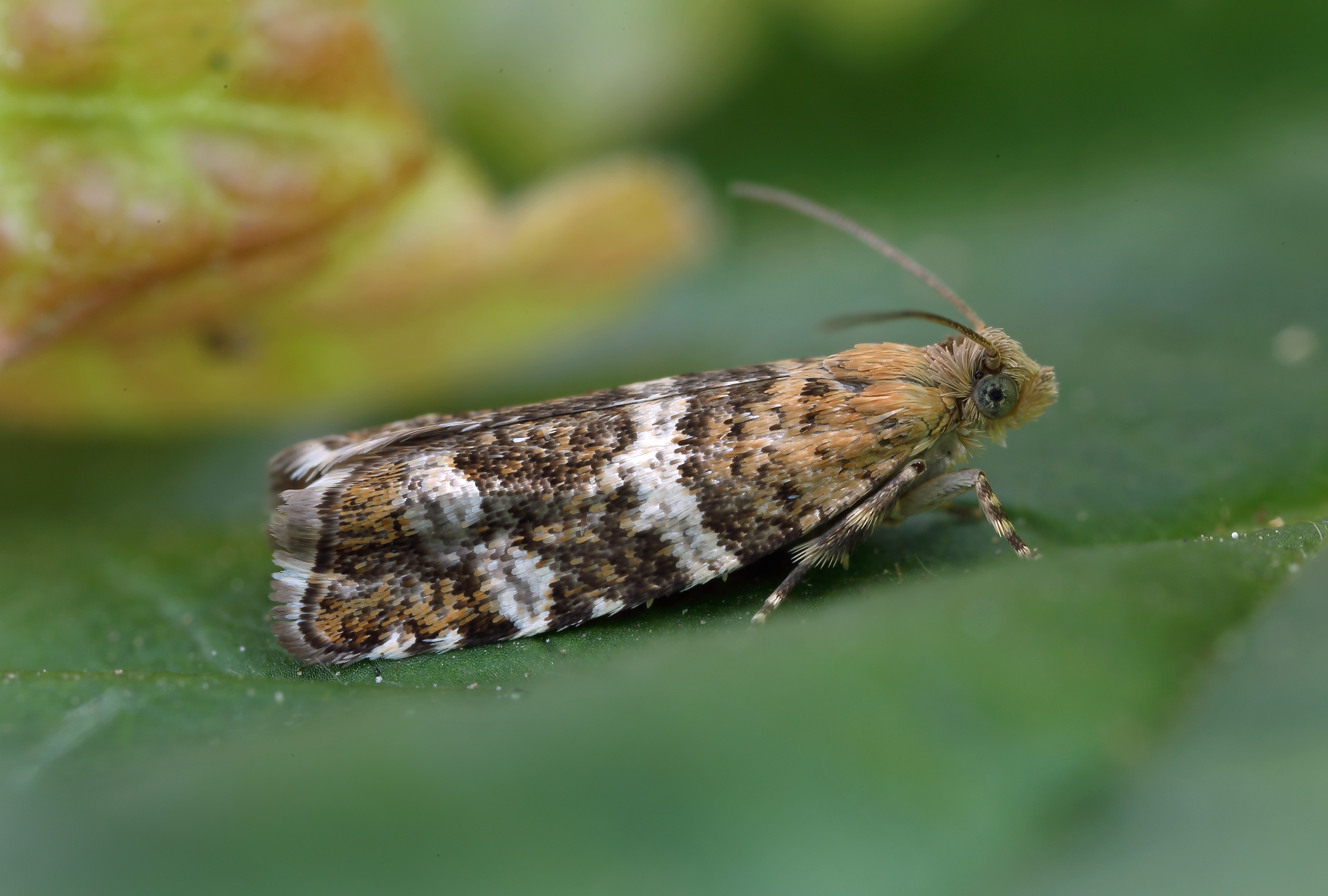

Scientific classification
- Kingdom: Animalia
- Phylum: Arthropoda
- Clade: Pancrustacea
- Class: Insecta
- Order: Lepidoptera
- Family: Tortricidae
- Genus: Epinotia
- Species: E. fraternana

Binomial name
- Epinotia fraternana (Haworth, 1811)

= Epinotia fraternana =

Species of butterfly

Epinotia fraternana is a butterfly belonging to the family Tortricidae. The species was first described by Adrian Hardy Haworth in 1811.

The wingspan ranges from 10 to 14 mm. The forewings are yellow-brown at the base and become more reddish-brown towards the tip, with two or more less distinct bright bands. The hindwings are brown and relatively narrow.

The larvae of this species feed on Abies alba. The adult wraps fly in June-July.

It is native to Europe.
