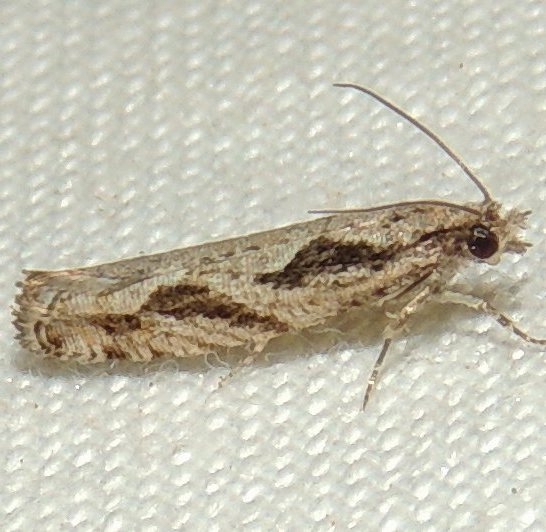

Scientific classification
- Kingdom: Animalia
- Phylum: Arthropoda
- Clade: Pancrustacea
- Class: Insecta
- Order: Lepidoptera
- Family: Tortricidae
- Genus: Epinotia
- Species: E. sotipena

Binomial name
- Epinotia sotipena Brown, 1986

= Epinotia sotipena =

Species of moth

Epinotia sotipena, the black dash epinotia moth, is a species of tortricid moth in the family Tortricidae.

The MONA or Hodges number for Epinotia sotipena is 3291.1.
