= Epinotia thaiensis =

Scientific classification
- Kingdom: Animalia
- Phylum: Arthropoda
- Class: Insecta
- Order: Lepidoptera
- Family: Tortricidae
- Genus: Epinotia
- Species: E. thaiensis

Binomial name
- Epinotia thaiensis Kawabe, 1995

Species of moth

Epinotia thaiensis is a species of moth of the family Tortricidae. It is found in China (Anhui) and Thailand.
