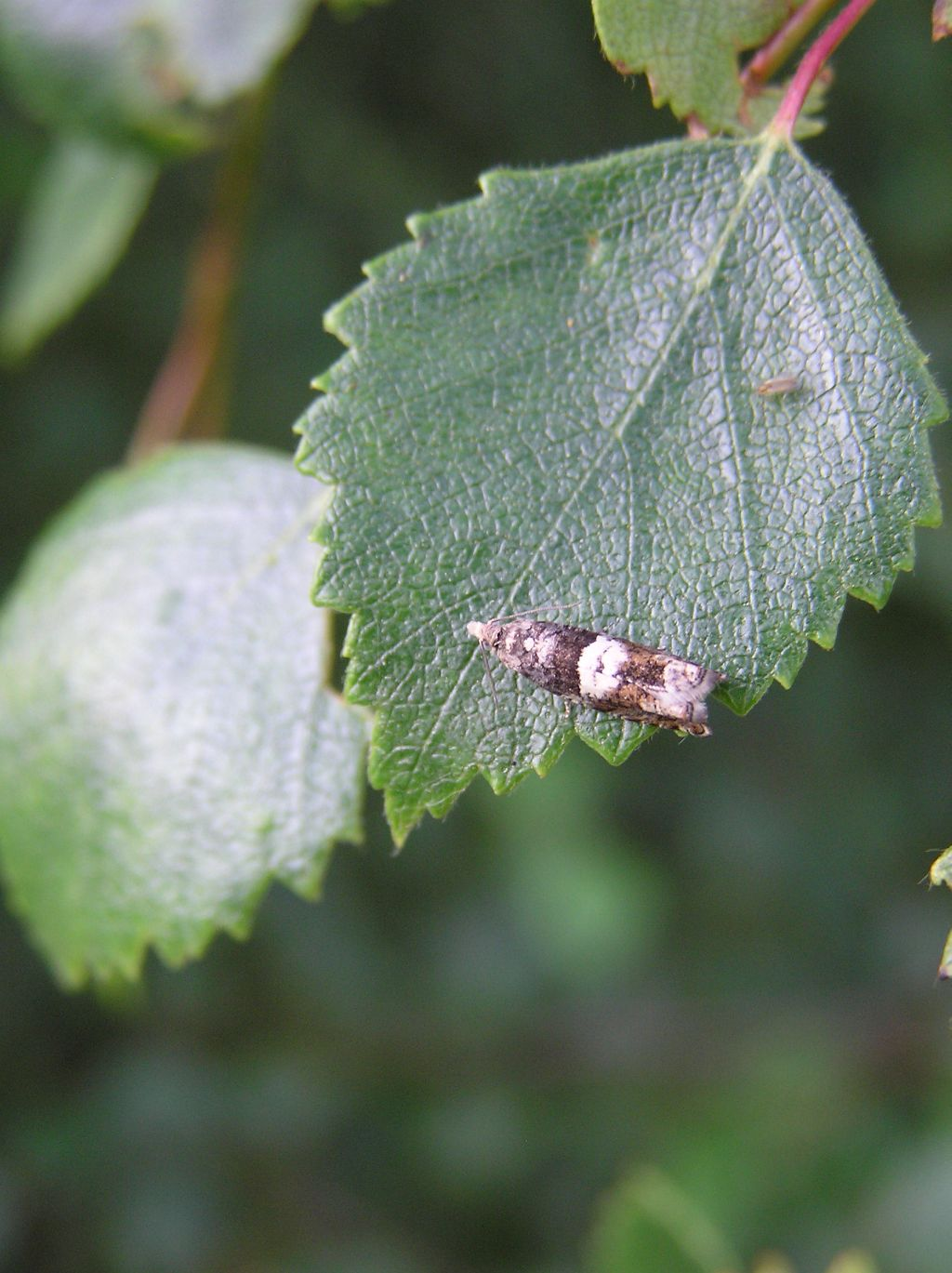

Scientific classification
- Domain: Eukaryota
- Kingdom: Animalia
- Phylum: Arthropoda
- Class: Insecta
- Order: Lepidoptera
- Family: Tortricidae
- Genus: Epinotia
- Species: E. demarniana

Binomial name
- Epinotia demarniana (Fischer von Röslerstamm, 1840

Synonyms
- Paedisca demarniana Fischer von Röslerstamm, 1840

= Epinotia demarniana =

Species of moth

Epinotia demarniana is a moth of the family Tortricidae found in most of Europe (except Iceland, Ireland, Portugal, Ukraine, and most of the Balkan Peninsula), east to the eastern part of the Palearctic realm.

Epinotia demarniana has a wingspan of 12 to 22 mm.

The larvae feed within the catkins of birch (Betula), alder (Alnus) and goat willow (Salix caprea). Adults are on wing from June to July.
