= Epinotia pentagonana =

Scientific classification
- Domain: Eukaryota
- Kingdom: Animalia
- Phylum: Arthropoda
- Class: Insecta
- Order: Lepidoptera
- Family: Tortricidae
- Genus: Epinotia
- Species: E. pentagonana

Binomial name
- Epinotia pentagonana Kennel, 1901

Synonyms
- Epinotia (Steganoptycha) maculosa Kuznetsov, 1966

Species of moth

Epinotia pentagonana is a species of moth of the family Tortricidae. It is found in China (Jilin), Korea, Japan and Russia.

The wingspan is 14–17 mm.

The larvae feed on Ulmus laciniata.
