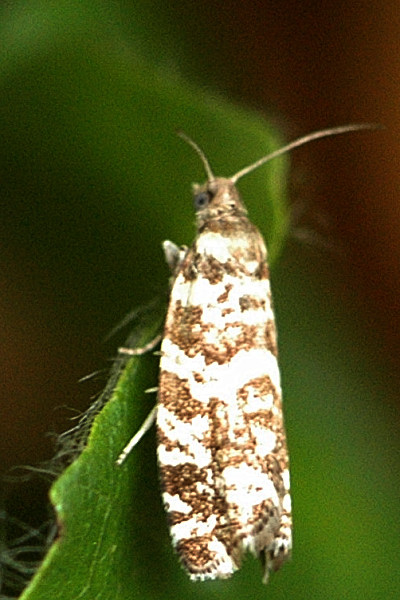

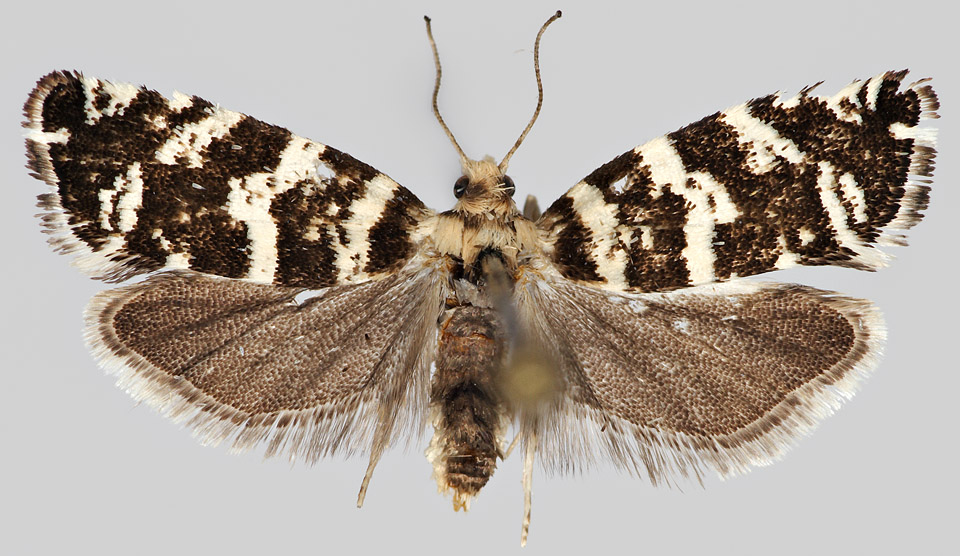

Scientific classification
- Kingdom: Animalia
- Phylum: Arthropoda
- Class: Insecta
- Order: Lepidoptera
- Family: Tortricidae
- Genus: Epinotia
- Species: E. tedella

Binomial name
- Epinotia tedella (Clerck, 1759)

= Epinotia tedella =

Species of moth

Epinotia tedella is a moth of the family Tortricidae. It is found in Europe.

The wingspan is 10–13 mm. The face and palpi are whitish. The forewings are pale brownish, strigulated or often wholly suffused with dark fuscous. The costa is posteriorly strigulated with white. Sometimes there is a whitish fascia within the basal patch. The central fascia is narrowed towards the costa and limited by two pairs of silvery-white or grey sometimes almost obsolete striae, the first somewhat curved, the second somewhat interrupted in middle. The posterior of the disc is often whitish-mixed. The termen is hardly sinuate. There is a white subapical dash in cilia. The hindwings are grey. The larva is green with a subdorsal line rather broad, reddish-grey; head and plate of 2 black.

The moth flies in one generation from April to June. In warm years there can be a second generation in August.

The larvae mainly feed on Norway spruce.

== Notes ==
1. The flight season refers to Belgium and the Netherlands. This may vary in other parts of the range.
