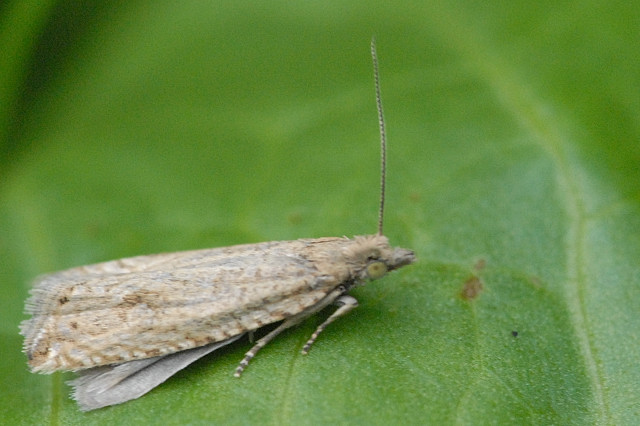

Scientific classification
- Domain: Eukaryota
- Kingdom: Animalia
- Phylum: Arthropoda
- Class: Insecta
- Order: Lepidoptera
- Family: Tortricidae
- Genus: Epinotia
- Species: E. sordidana

Binomial name
- Epinotia sordidana (Hübner, [1824])

= Epinotia sordidana =

Species of moth

Epinotia sordidana is a moth of the family Tortricidae found in Europe.

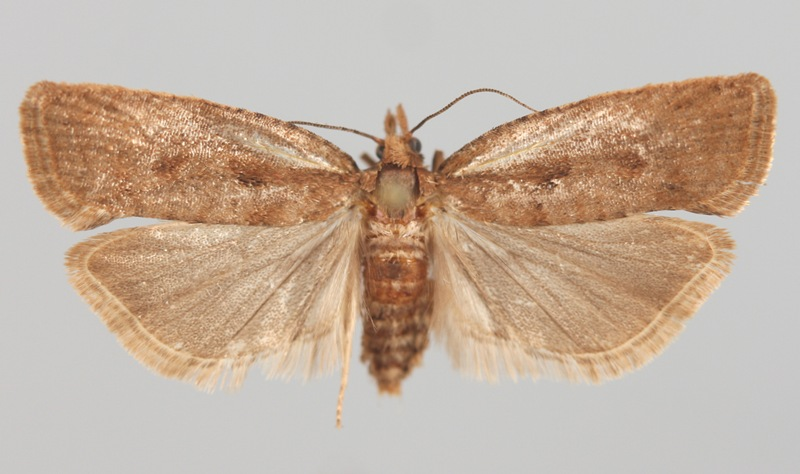
Mounted

The wingspan is 18–23 mm. The moth flies from August to November..

The larvae mainly feed on alder.

== Notes ==
1. The flight season refers to Belgium and The Netherlands. This may vary in other parts of the range.
