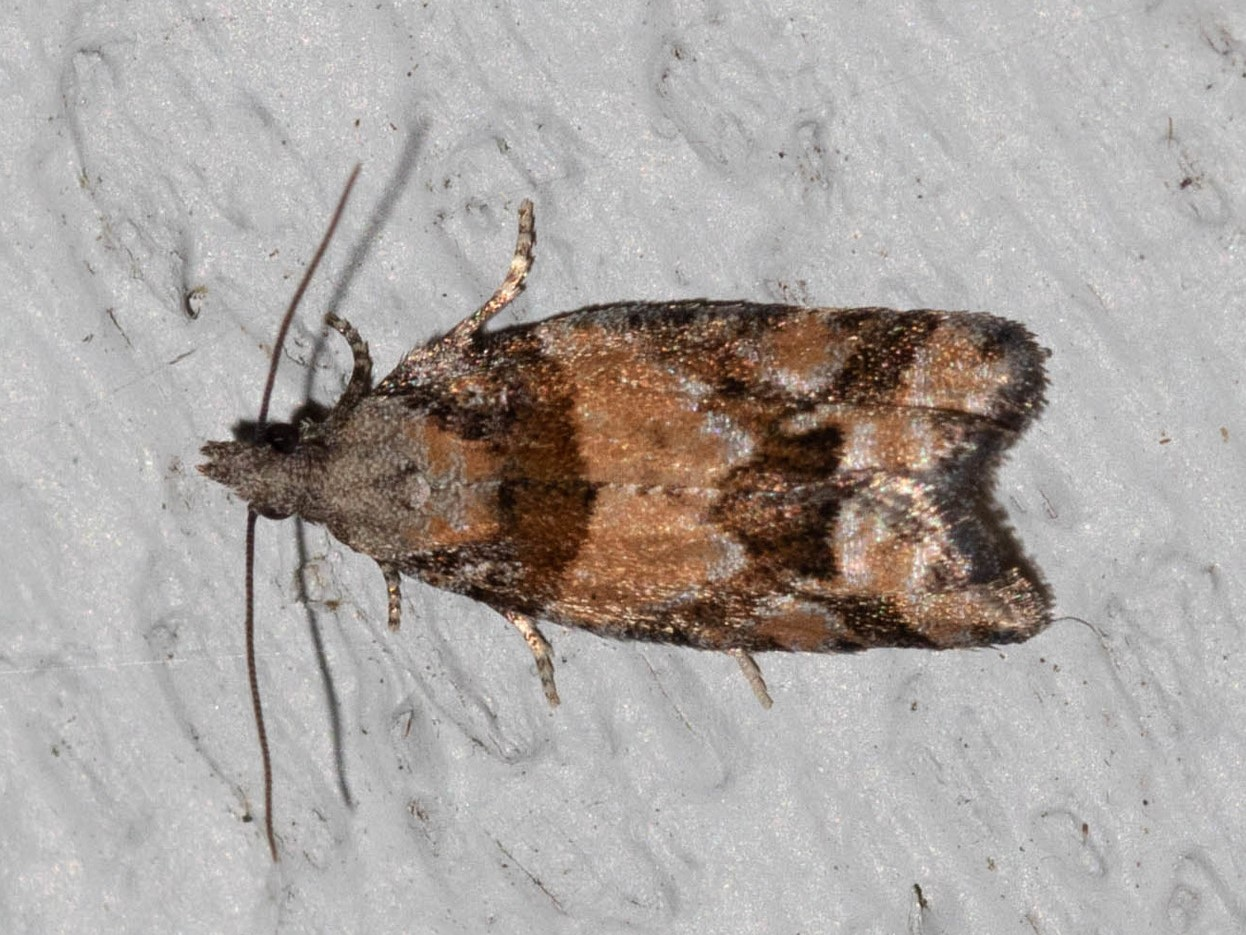

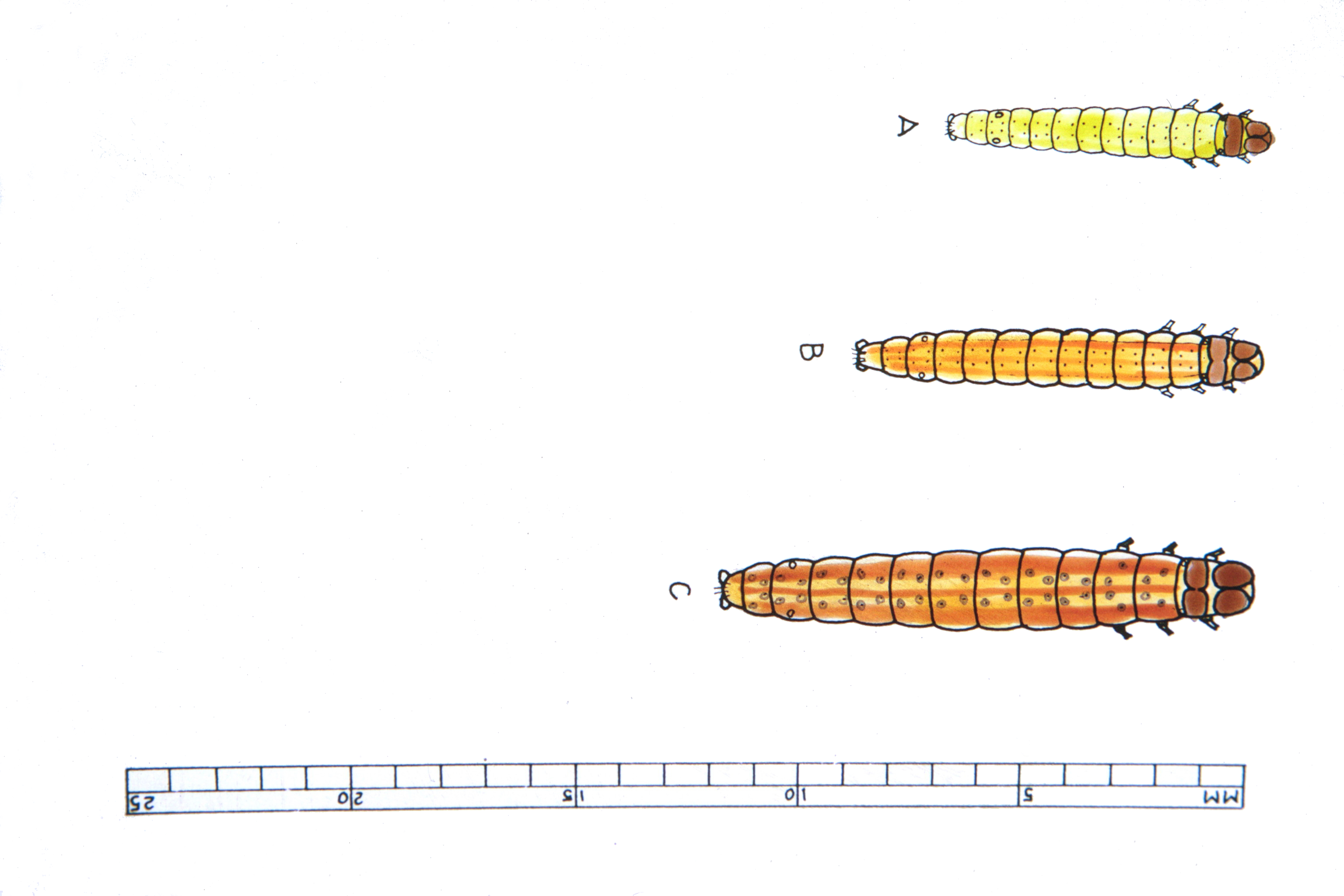
- Adult (top) and larvae (bottom)

Scientific classification
- Domain: Eukaryota
- Kingdom: Animalia
- Phylum: Arthropoda
- Class: Insecta
- Order: Lepidoptera
- Family: Tortricidae
- Genus: Epinotia
- Species: E. radicana

Binomial name
- Epinotia radicana (Heinrich, 1923)

Synonyms
- Griselda radicana Heinrich, 1923

= Epinotia radicana =

Species of moth

Epinotia radicana, the red-striped needleworm moth, is a species of moth of the family Tortricidae. It is found in western Canada, including British Columbia and Alberta.

The wingspan is 12–15 mm.

The red-striped needleworm moth occurs commonly in the spruce-fir forests of North America, but there are no records of serious outbreaks. White spruce is the preferred host tree. The eggs overwinter on the needles and the larvae feed on the new foliage from late May to late July. Full-grown larvae, about 9 mm long, drop to the ground and pupate in silken cocoons in the litter. The adults emerge in late summer and the fall, and the females lay their eggs singly at the base of the needles.

The larvae have been recorded on Abies balsamea, Abies concolor, Abies grandis, Abies lasiocarpa, Abies magnifica, Juniperus, Larix laricina, Larix lyallii, Larix occidentalis, Picea engelmanni, Picea glauca, Picea mariana, Picea pungens, Picea rubens, Picea sitchensis, Pinus contorta, Pseudotsuga menziesii, Thuja plicata and Tsuga heterophylla.
