= Epinotia evidens =

Scientific classification
- Domain: Eukaryota
- Kingdom: Animalia
- Phylum: Arthropoda
- Class: Insecta
- Order: Lepidoptera
- Family: Tortricidae
- Genus: Epinotia
- Species: E. evidens

Binomial name
- Epinotia evidens Kuznetzov, 1971

Species of moth

Epinotia evidens is a species of moth of the family Tortricidae. It is found in Yunnan, China.
