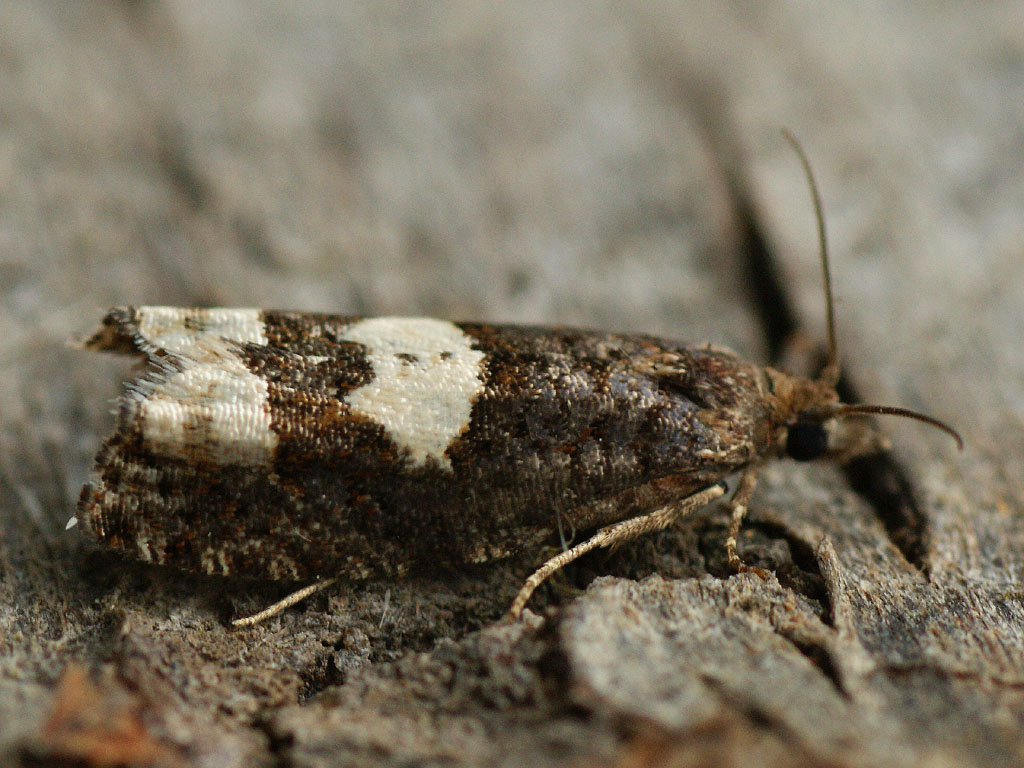
- Epinotia trigonella Moscow Oblast

Scientific classification
- Kingdom: Animalia
- Phylum: Arthropoda
- Class: Insecta
- Order: Lepidoptera
- Family: Tortricidae
- Genus: Epinotia
- Species: E. trigonella

Binomial name
- Epinotia trigonella (Linnaeus, 1758)

Synonyms
- Phalaena (Tinea) trigonella Linnaeus, 1758; Phalaena bimaculana Donovan, [1808]; Grapholitha biscutana Wocke, 1862; Paedsica cervana Eversmann, 1844; Paedisca dissimilana Treitschke, 1835; Teras indecorana Zetterstedt, 1839; Eucosma petalonota Meyrick, 1937; Phalaena (Tortrix) similana Hubner, 1793; Tortrix straemiana Haworth, [1811]; Pyralis stroemiana Fabricius, 1781

= Epinotia trigonella =

Species of moth

Epinotia trigonella, the birch epinotia moth, is a species of moth of the family Tortricidae. It is found in most of Europe, east to the eastern Palearctic realm. It is also found in North America.

The wingspan is 16–21 mm. Adults are on wing from August to September.

The larvae feed on Betula species. They feed between folded or spun leaves of their host plant.
