= Epinotia chloana =

Scientific classification
- Domain: Eukaryota
- Kingdom: Animalia
- Phylum: Arthropoda
- Class: Insecta
- Order: Lepidoptera
- Family: Tortricidae
- Genus: Epinotia
- Species: E. chloana

Binomial name
- Epinotia chloana Razowski & Wojtusiak, 2006

Species of moth

Epinotia chloana is a species of moth of the family Tortricidae. It is found in Morona-Santiago Province, Ecuador.

The wingspan is about 22 mm.
