= Epinotia salicicolana =

Scientific classification
- Domain: Eukaryota
- Kingdom: Animalia
- Phylum: Arthropoda
- Class: Insecta
- Order: Lepidoptera
- Family: Tortricidae
- Genus: Epinotia
- Species: E. salicicolana

Binomial name
- Epinotia salicicolana Kuznetzov, 1968

Species of moth

Epinotia salicicolana is a species of moth of the family Tortricidae. It is found in China (Shaanxi), Taiwan, Japan and Russia.

The larvae feed on Salix caprea and Salix sachalinensis.
