= Epinotia ulmi =

Scientific classification
- Kingdom: Animalia
- Phylum: Arthropoda
- Clade: Pancrustacea
- Class: Insecta
- Order: Lepidoptera
- Family: Tortricidae
- Genus: Epinotia
- Species: E. ulmi

Binomial name
- Epinotia ulmi Kuznetzov, 1966

Synonyms
- Epinotia (Panoplia) ulmi Kuznetzov, 1966

Species of moth

Epinotia ulmi is a species of moth of the family Tortricidae. It is found in China (Jilin), Korea, Japan and Russia.

The wingspan is about 14.5 mm.

The larvae feed on Ulmus propinqua.
