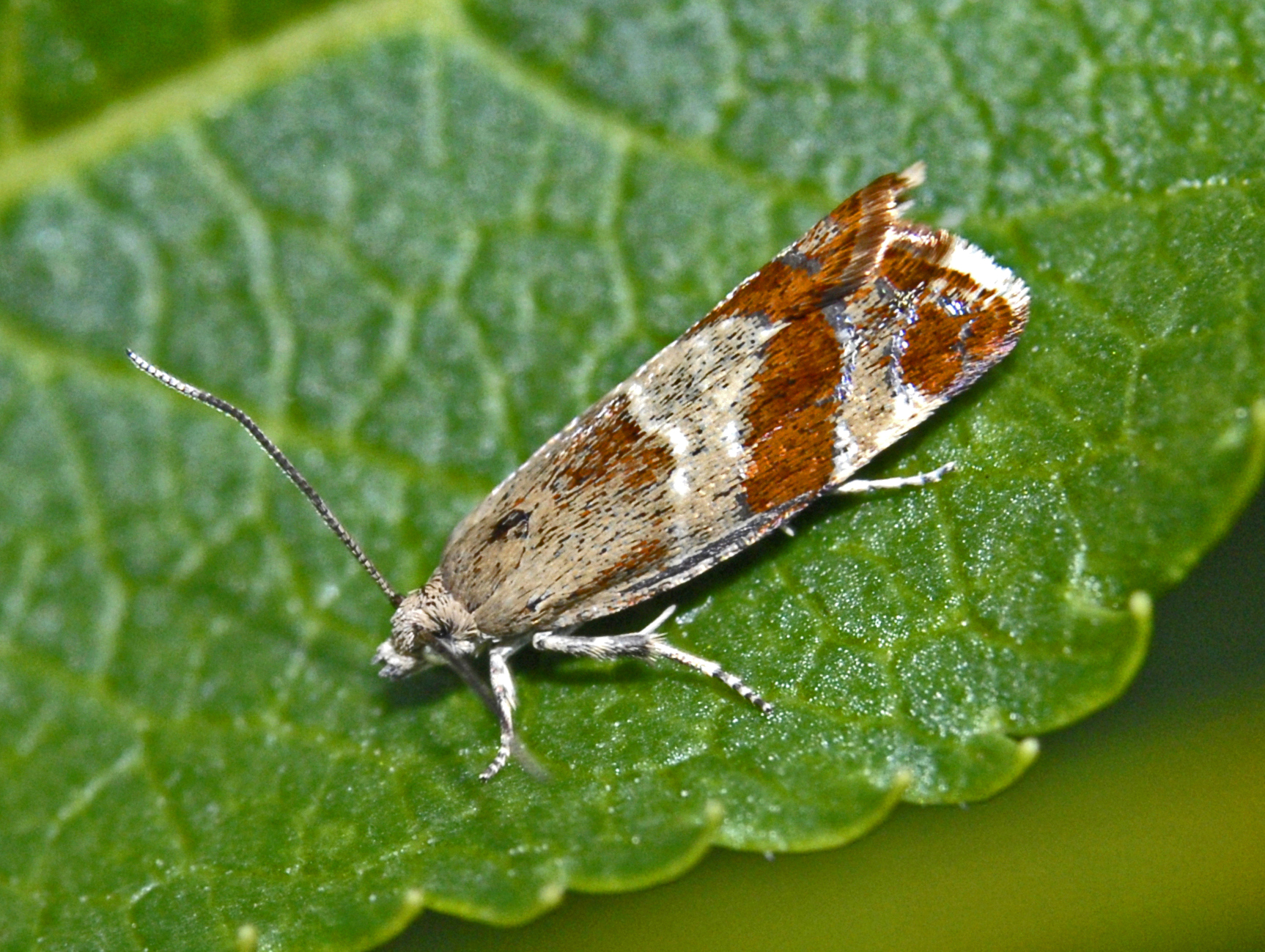
- A live individual
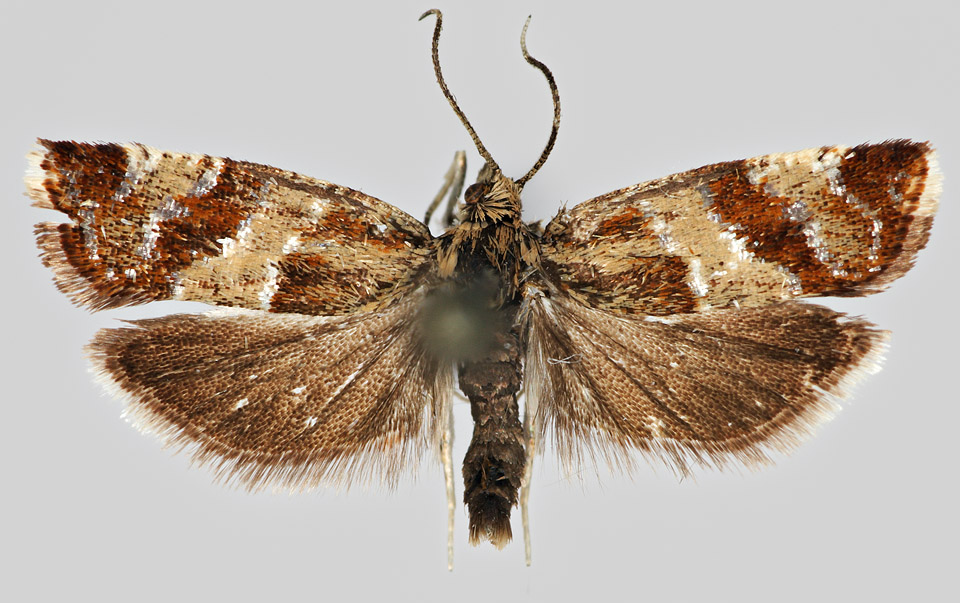
- Mounted specimen

Scientific classification
- Kingdom: Animalia
- Phylum: Arthropoda
- Class: Insecta
- Order: Lepidoptera
- Family: Tortricidae
- Genus: Epinotia
- Species: E. cruciana

Binomial name
- Epinotia cruciana (Linnaeus, 1761)

Synonyms
- Phalaena cruciana Linnaeus, 1761; Tortrix augustana (Hübner, 1811-13); Sciaphila vilisana Walker, 1863; Enarmonia cockleana (Kearfott, 1904); Epinotia cruciana lepida Heinrich, 1924; Epinotia cruciana alaskae Heinrich, 1923; Pamplusia alticolana Stephens, 1852; Hypermecia angustana Desmarest, 1857; Tortrix brunneana Frolich, 1828; Sciaphila direptana Walker, 1863; Hypermecia excaecana Stephens, 1852; excoecana Herrich-Schaffer, 1849; Tortrix (Grapholitha) excoecana Herrich-Schaffer, 1851; Epinotia cruciana ab. gradli Rebel, 1929; Tortrix gyllenhahliana Thunberg & Borgstrm, 1784; Hypermecia viminana Guenee, 1845

= Epinotia cruciana =

Species of moth

Epinotia cruciana, the willow tortrix, is a moth of the family Tortricidae.

== Description ==
The wingspan is 12–15 mm. This moth has a characteristic wing pattern, with a pale brown ground colour and dark brown markings of the forewings, resembling a cross (hence the Latin name cruciana of the species).

Adults are on wing from June to early August.

The larvae feed on various sallows and willows, mainly Salix repens, on which the larva spins together the leaves of a terminal shoot and feeds within.

== Distribution ==
This species can be found from Europe to Japan and in North America.
