= Epinotia pinicola =

Scientific classification
- Domain: Eukaryota
- Kingdom: Animalia
- Phylum: Arthropoda
- Class: Insecta
- Order: Lepidoptera
- Family: Tortricidae
- Genus: Epinotia
- Species: E. pinicola

Binomial name
- Epinotia pinicola Kuznetzov, 1970

Synonyms
- Epinotia (Steganoptycha) pinicola Kuznetzov, 1969; Epinotia pinicola boreales Kuznetzov, 1976; Epinotia pinicola borealis Kuznetzov, 1969

Species of moth

Epinotia pinicola is a species of moth of the family Tortricidae. It is found in China (Henan, Sichuan), Korea, Japan and Russia.

The wingspan is 13–16 mm.

The larvae feed on Pinus pumila.
