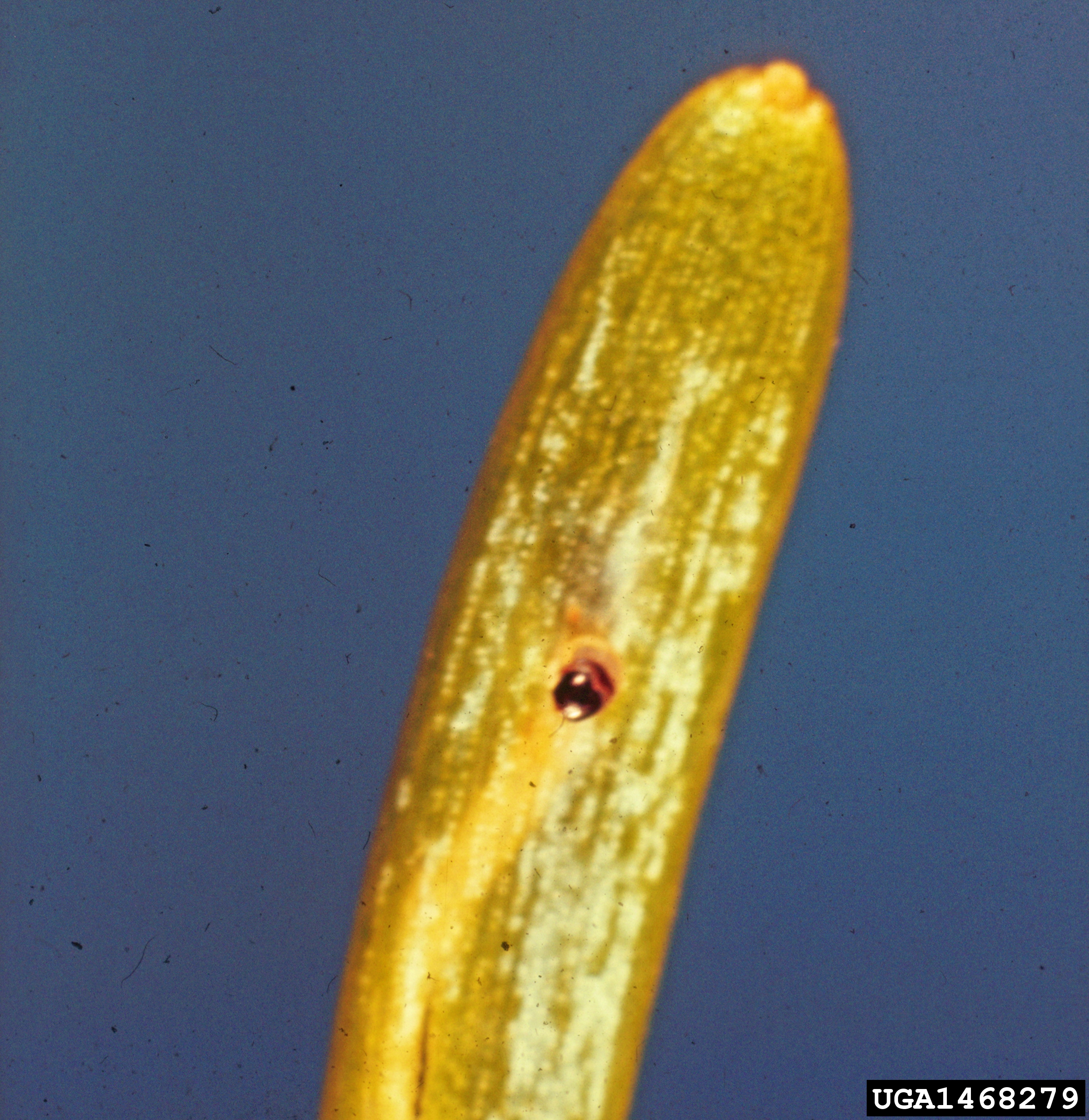
- Larva in mine

Scientific classification
- Domain: Eukaryota
- Kingdom: Animalia
- Phylum: Arthropoda
- Class: Insecta
- Order: Lepidoptera
- Family: Tortricidae
- Genus: Epinotia
- Species: E. meritana

Binomial name
- Epinotia meritana Heinrich, 1923

= Epinotia meritana =

Species of moth

Epinotia meritana, the white-fir needle miner, is a moth of the family Tortricidae. It is found in the western United States, including Utah, New Mexico and Arizona.

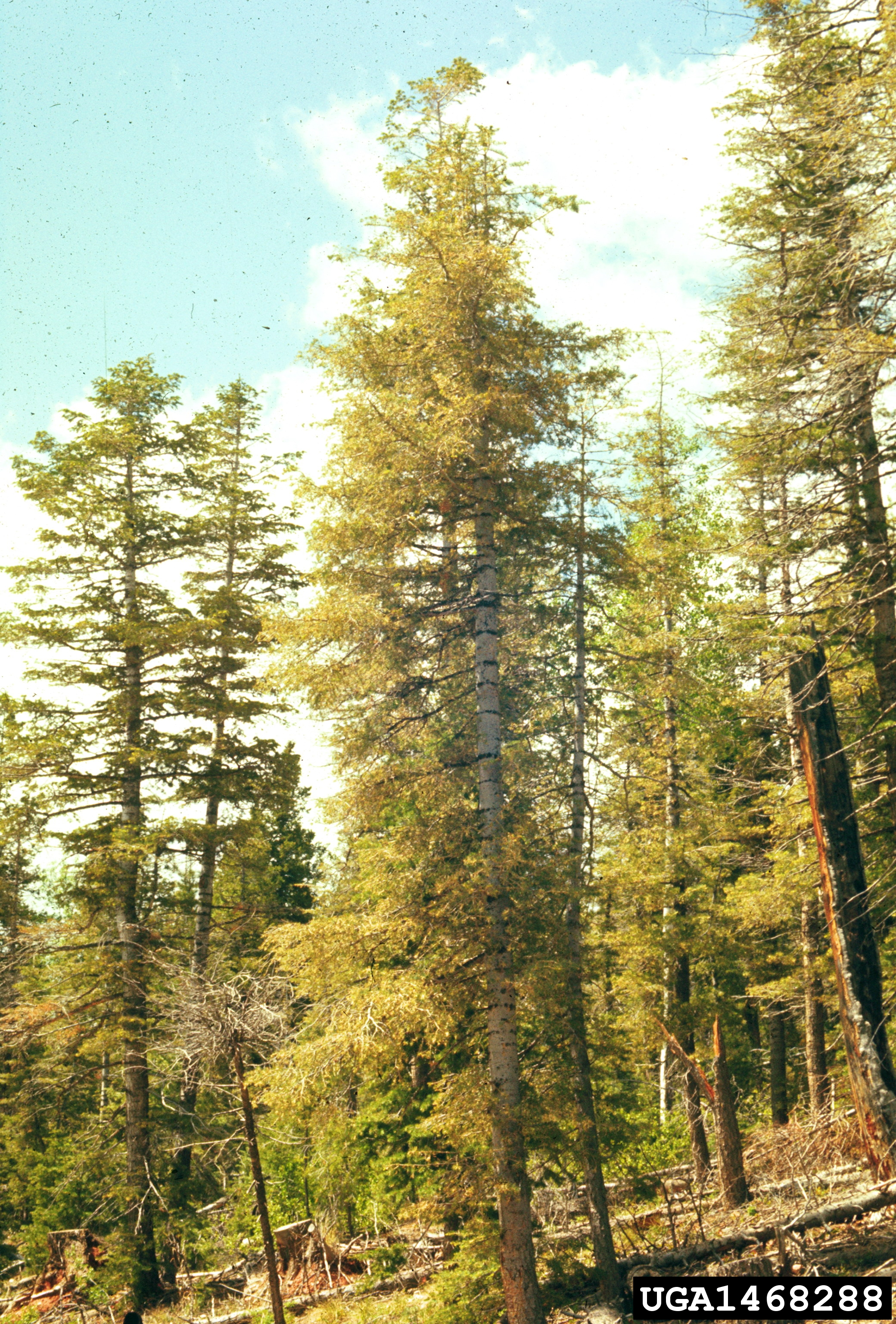
Damage

The wingspan is about 9 mm. Adults are on wing in late June and July. There is one generation per year in New Mexico and Arizona.

The larvae have been recorded on Abies concolor and Abies magnifica. They mine the needles of their host plant.
