= Epinotia rubricana =

Scientific classification
- Domain: Eukaryota
- Kingdom: Animalia
- Phylum: Arthropoda
- Class: Insecta
- Order: Lepidoptera
- Family: Tortricidae
- Genus: Epinotia
- Species: E. rubricana

Binomial name
- Epinotia rubricana Kuznetzov, 1968

Synonyms
- Epinotia (Steganoptycha) rubricana Kuznetzov, 1968

Species of moth

Epinotia rubricana is a species of moth of the family Tortricidae. It is found in Taiwan, Korea, Japan and Russia.

The wingspan is 16–19 mm.
