= Epinotia niveipalpa =

Scientific classification
- Domain: Eukaryota
- Kingdom: Animalia
- Phylum: Arthropoda
- Class: Insecta
- Order: Lepidoptera
- Family: Tortricidae
- Genus: Epinotia
- Species: E. niveipalpa

Binomial name
- Epinotia niveipalpa Razowski, 2009

Species of moth

Epinotia niveipalpa is a moth of the family Tortricidae. It is found in Vietnam.

The wingspan is 25 mm.
