= Epinotia aciculana =

Scientific classification
- Domain: Eukaryota
- Kingdom: Animalia
- Phylum: Arthropoda
- Class: Insecta
- Order: Lepidoptera
- Family: Tortricidae
- Genus: Epinotia
- Species: E. aciculana

Binomial name
- Epinotia aciculana Falkovitsh, 1965

Species of moth

Epinotia aciculana is a species of moth of the family Tortricidae. It is found in China (Heilongjiang), Japan and the Russian Far East (Primorsky Krai).

The wingspan is about 12 mm.

The larvae feed on Picea asperata, Abies fabri, Abies holophylla, Abies nephrolepis and Abies sachalinensis.
