= Epinotia tenebrica =

Scientific classification
- Domain: Eukaryota
- Kingdom: Animalia
- Phylum: Arthropoda
- Class: Insecta
- Order: Lepidoptera
- Family: Tortricidae
- Genus: Epinotia
- Species: E. tenebrica

Binomial name
- Epinotia tenebrica Razowski & Wojtusiak, 2006

Species of moth

Epinotia tenebrica is a species of moth of the family Tortricidae. It is found in Morona-Santiago Province, Ecuador.

The wingspan is about 24 mm.

== Etymology ==
The species name refers to colouration of the forewings and is derived from Latin tenebricus (meaning darkened).
