= Epinotia crenana =

Scientific classification
- Kingdom: Animalia
- Phylum: Arthropoda
- Class: Insecta
- Order: Lepidoptera
- Family: Tortricidae
- Genus: Epinotia
- Species: E. crenana

Binomial name
- Epinotia crenana Hübner, 1814-1817

Species of moth

Epinotia crenana is a moth belonging to the family Tortricidae. The species was first described by Jacob Hübner in 1814–1817.
