= Epinotia majorana =

Scientific classification
- Domain: Eukaryota
- Kingdom: Animalia
- Phylum: Arthropoda
- Class: Insecta
- Order: Lepidoptera
- Family: Tortricidae
- Genus: Epinotia
- Species: E. majorana

Binomial name
- Epinotia majorana (Caradja, 1916)

Synonyms
- Gypsonoma incarnana var. majorana Caradja, 1916; Eucosma leucantha Meyrick, 1931

Species of moth

Epinotia majorana is a species of moth of the family Tortricidae. It is found in north-eastern China, Korea, Japan and Russia.

The wingspan is 12–15 mm.

The larvae feed on Heracleum moellendorfii, Daucus carota var. sativa and Betula dahurica.
