= Epinotia javierana =

Scientific classification
- Kingdom: Animalia
- Phylum: Arthropoda
- Class: Insecta
- Order: Lepidoptera
- Family: Tortricidae
- Genus: Epinotia
- Species: E. javierana

Binomial name
- Epinotia javierana Razowski & Pelz, 2007

Species of moth

Epinotia javierana is a species of moth of the family Tortricidae. It is found in Argentina.

The wingspan is about 17 mm.

== Etymology ==
The species name refers to San Javier, the type locality.
