= Epinotia piceicola =

Scientific classification
- Domain: Eukaryota
- Kingdom: Animalia
- Phylum: Arthropoda
- Class: Insecta
- Order: Lepidoptera
- Family: Tortricidae
- Genus: Epinotia
- Species: E. piceicola

Binomial name
- Epinotia piceicola Kuznetzov, 1970

Synonyms
- Epinotia (Steganoptycha) piceae Kuznetzov, 1968

Species of moth

Epinotia piceicola is a species of moth of the family Tortricidae. It is found in Taiwan, Japan and Russia.

The larvae feed on Picea glehnii.
