= Epinotia nigricana =

Scientific classification
- Domain: Eukaryota
- Kingdom: Animalia
- Phylum: Arthropoda
- Class: Insecta
- Order: Lepidoptera
- Family: Tortricidae
- Genus: Epinotia
- Species: E. nigricana

Binomial name
- Epinotia nigricana (Herrich-Schaffer, 1851)

Species of moth

Epinotia nigricana is a species of moth belonging to the family Tortricidae.

It is native to Europe. The wingspan is 11–13 mm. The forewings are brown variegated with traces of a bright cross-band in the middle. The hindwings are brown.

The larva develops between the spun leaves of Abies alba.
