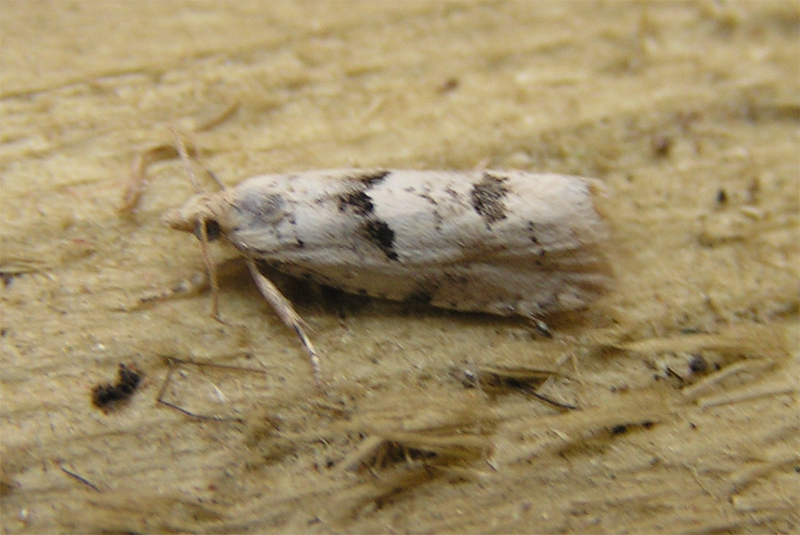

Scientific classification
- Domain: Eukaryota
- Kingdom: Animalia
- Phylum: Arthropoda
- Class: Insecta
- Order: Lepidoptera
- Family: Tortricidae
- Genus: Epinotia
- Species: E. bilunana

Binomial name
- Epinotia bilunana (Haworth, [1811])

= Epinotia bilunana =

Species of moth

Epinotia bilunana is a moth of the family Tortricidae. It is found in Europe, and quite widespread throughout Britain.

The wingspan is 13–17 mm. The moth flies from May to August..

== Notes ==
1. The flight season refers to Belgium and the Netherlands. This may vary in other parts of the range.
