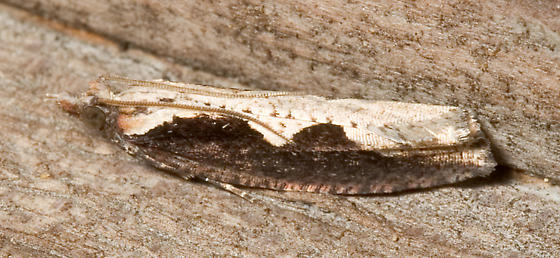

Scientific classification
- Domain: Eukaryota
- Kingdom: Animalia
- Phylum: Arthropoda
- Class: Insecta
- Order: Lepidoptera
- Family: Tortricidae
- Genus: Epinotia
- Species: E. lindana

Binomial name
- Epinotia lindana (Fernald, 1892)

Synonyms
- Steganopteryx lindana Fernald, 1892

= Epinotia lindana =

Species of moth

Epinotia lindana, the diamondback epinotia moth, is a moth of the family Tortricidae. It is found in North America, records include British Columbia, Ontario, Quebec, Alberta, North Carolina, Washington and Pennsylvania.

The wingspan is about 17 mm.

The larvae feed on Cornus species.
