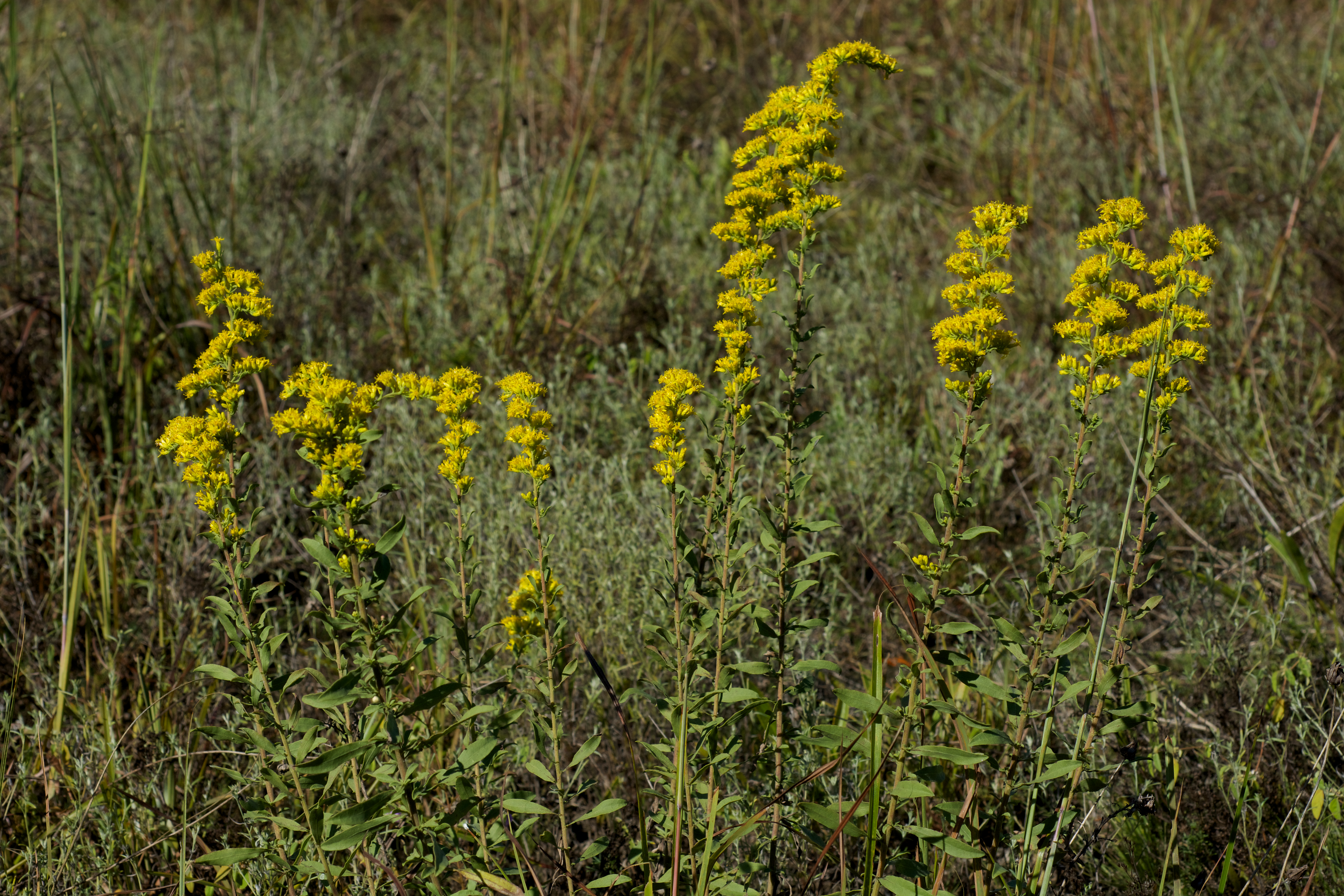

Conservation status
- Secure (NatureServe)

Scientific classification
- Kingdom: Plantae
- Clade: Tracheophytes
- Clade: Angiosperms
- Clade: Eudicots
- Clade: Asterids
- Order: Asterales
- Family: Asteraceae
- Genus: Solidago
- Species: S. nemoralis

Binomial name
- Solidago nemoralis Aiton 1789

Synonyms
- Aster hispidus (Muhl. ex Willd.) Kuntze not Thunb. 1783; Doria pulcherrima (A.Nelson) Lunell

= Solidago nemoralis =

Species of plant

Solidago nemoralis is a species of flowering plant in the family Asteraceae. It is native to North America, where it is widely found in Canada (every province except Newfoundland and Labrador) and the United States (all states wholly or partially east of the Rocky Mountains). Its common names include gray goldenrod, gray-stem goldenrod, old-field goldenrod, field goldenrod, prairie goldenrod, dwarf goldenrod, and dyersweed goldenrod.

== Description ==
Like other goldenrods, this species is a perennial herb. One of the smaller goldenrods, it grows 20 centimeters to one meter (8–40 inches) tall from a branching underground caudex. There are 1 to 6 erect stems, sometimes more. The stems are reddish to gray-green and have lines of short, white hairs. The lower leaves are up to 10 centimeters (4 inches long) and the blades are borne on winged petioles. Leaves on the upper half of the stem are narrower and shorter and lack petioles. The spreading inflorescence can carry up to 300 flower heads. The head contains 5 to 11 yellow ray florets each a few millimeters long surrounding up to 10 yellow disc florets. Flowering occurs in late summer and fall. The fruit is a rough-texured cypsela about 2 millimeters long tipped with a pappus of bristles slightly longer.

There are two subspecies:

- Solidago nemoralis ssp. decemflora – tetraploid taxon with larger flower heads and narrower basal leaves in west-central North America
- Solidago nemoralis ssp. nemoralis – diploid or tetraploid taxon in the eastern regions of the species' range

== Ecology ==
This plant grows in forests, woods, prairies, grasslands, and disturbed areas such as old fields and roadsides. It is a pioneer species and it can become weedy.

The flowers have a variety of insect pollinators, including honey bees, carpenter bees, sweat bees, plasterer bees, sphecid wasps, vespid wasps, butterflies, moths, beetles, hoverflies, tachinid flies, flesh flies, blow flies, and muscid flies.

Insects such as the goldenrod scarlet plant bug, leaf-footed bugs, and various caterpillars feed on the foliage. The American goldfinch feeds on the fruits.

=== Galls ===
This species is host to the following insect induced galls:

- Asteromyia carbonifera (Osten Sacken, 1862)
- Epiblema scudderiana (Clemens, 1860)
- Gnorimoschema gallaesolidaginis (Fitch, 1855)
- Procecidochares atra (Loew, 1862) (summer and autumn generations)

== Uses ==
The plant has had various uses among Native American peoples. The Houma people have used it medicinally to treat jaundice. The Goshute have used the seeds for food. The Navajo have used it as incense.

It is cultivated in landscaping and gardens, such as butterfly gardens.
