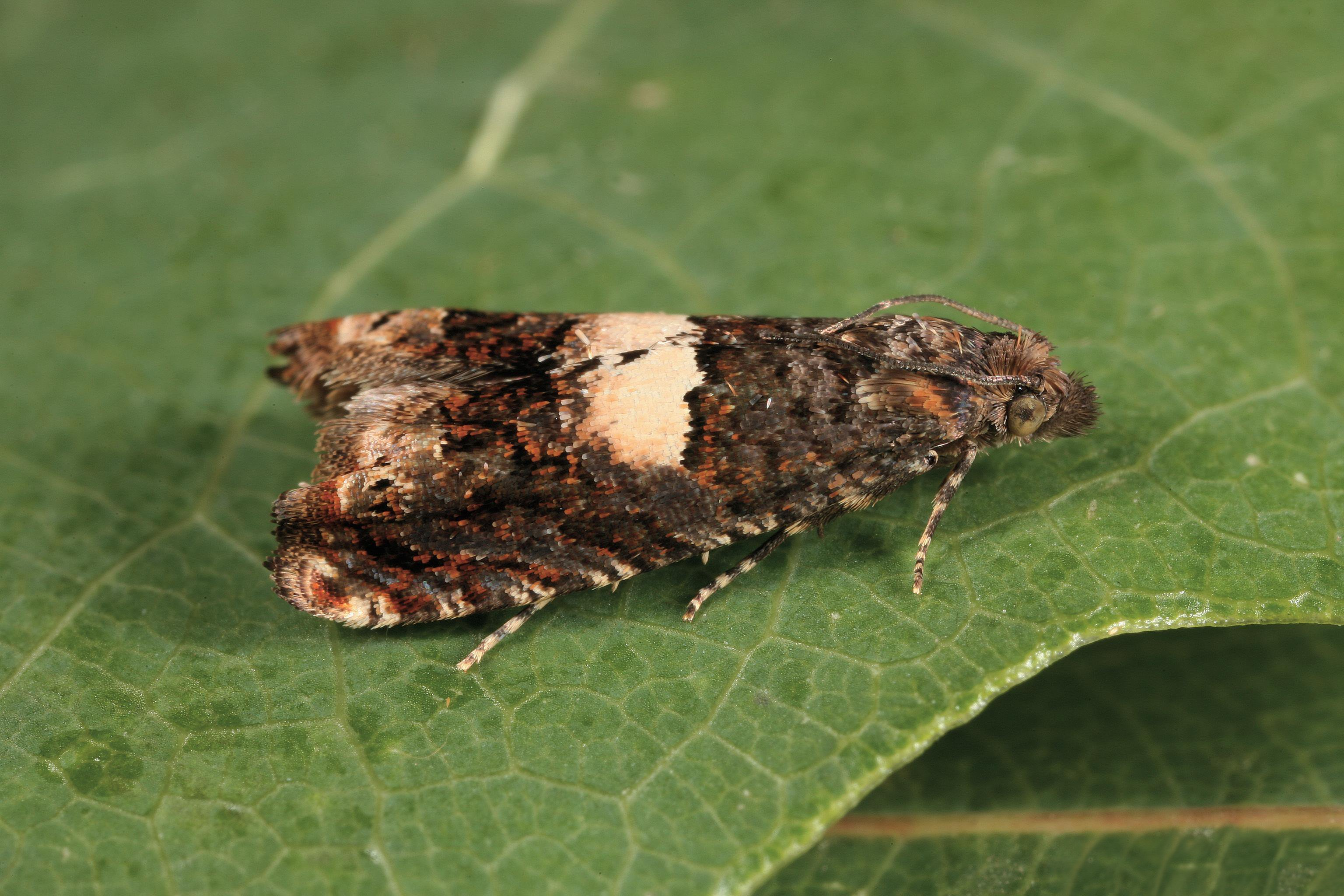

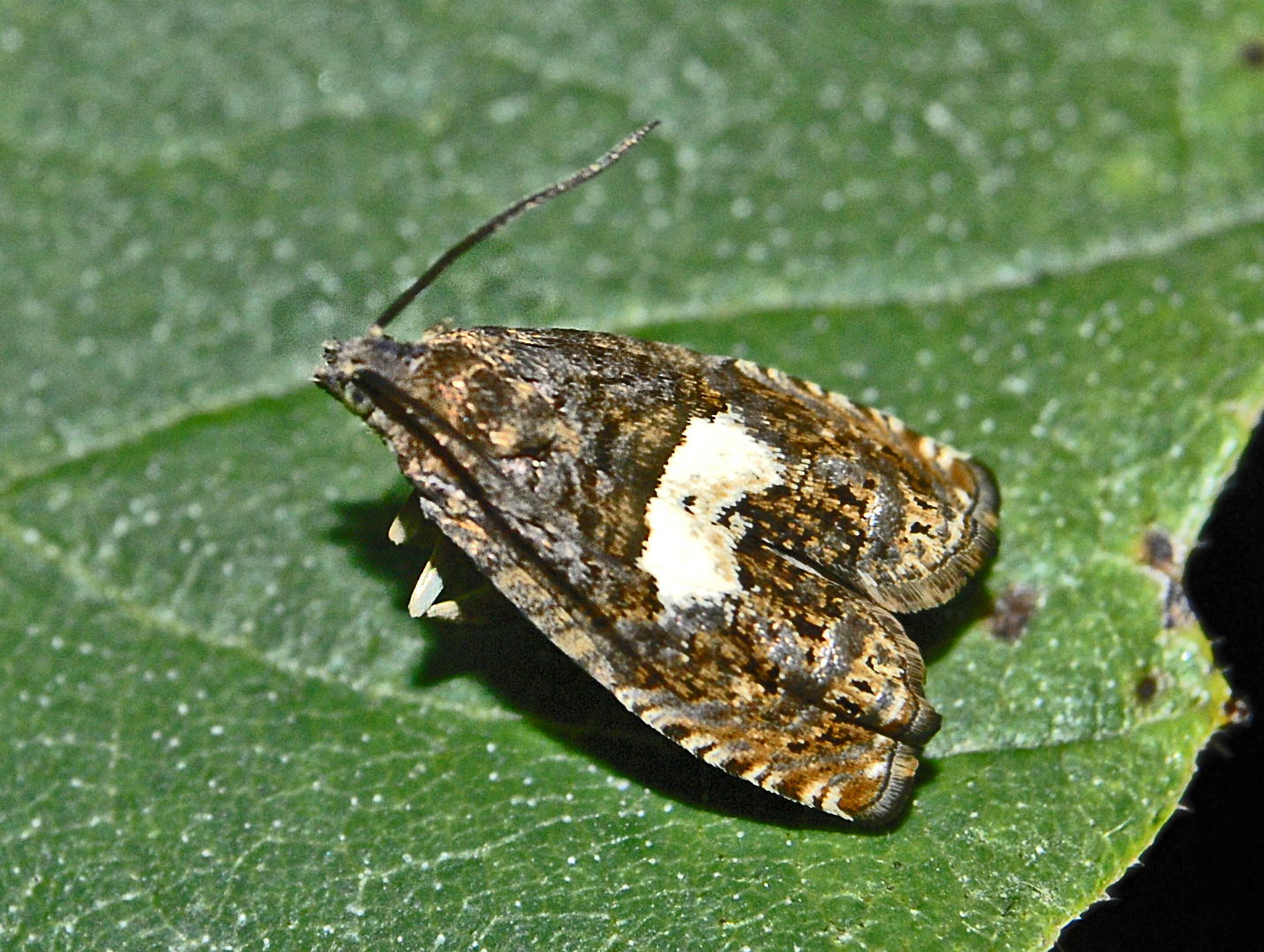
- With opened wings

Scientific classification
- Kingdom: Animalia
- Phylum: Arthropoda
- Clade: Pancrustacea
- Class: Insecta
- Order: Lepidoptera
- Family: Tortricidae
- Genus: Epiblema
- Species: E. sticticana

Binomial name
- Epiblema sticticana (Duponchel, in Godart, 1842)

Synonyms
- Pyralis sticticana Fabricius, 1794; Pyralis brunichana Fabricius, 1787; Epiblema brunichiana Hubner, [1825]; Eucosma farfarae T. B. Fletcher, 1938; Epiblema kemnerana Lewin, 1942; Epiblema melstediana Larsen, 1927; Grapholitha quadratana Eversmann, 1844

= Epiblema sticticana =

Species of moth

Epiblema sticticana is a species of moth of the family Tortricidae described by Philogène Auguste Joseph Duponchel in 1842.

== Description ==
The wingspan is 15–20 mm (0.59–0.79 in). Forewings show a subquadrate large whitish dorsal blotch and a light brown colouration. These moths are very similar to Epiblema scutulana and Epiblema cirsiana, but they are generally browner and lighter.

== Biology ==
The larvae feed on coltsfoot (Tussilago farfara), winter heliotrope (Petasites fragrans), greater burdock (Arctium lappa), marsh thistle (Cirsium palustre), musk thistle (Carduus nutans) and spear thistle (Cirsium vulgare). They initially feed in the roots, but later in the flower lower stems. Adults are on wing from May to June.

== Distribution and habitat ==
This species can be found in almost all of Europe, as well as the eastern Palearctic realm and the Near East. It mainly occurs in waste grounds, rough meadows, damp grounds and coastal areas.
