= Epiblema alishana =

Scientific classification
- Kingdom: Animalia
- Phylum: Arthropoda
- Class: Insecta
- Order: Lepidoptera
- Family: Tortricidae
- Genus: Epiblema
- Species: E. alishana

Binomial name
- Epiblema alishana Kawabe, 1986

Species of moth

Epiblema alishana is a species of moth of the family Tortricidae. It is found in Taiwan.
