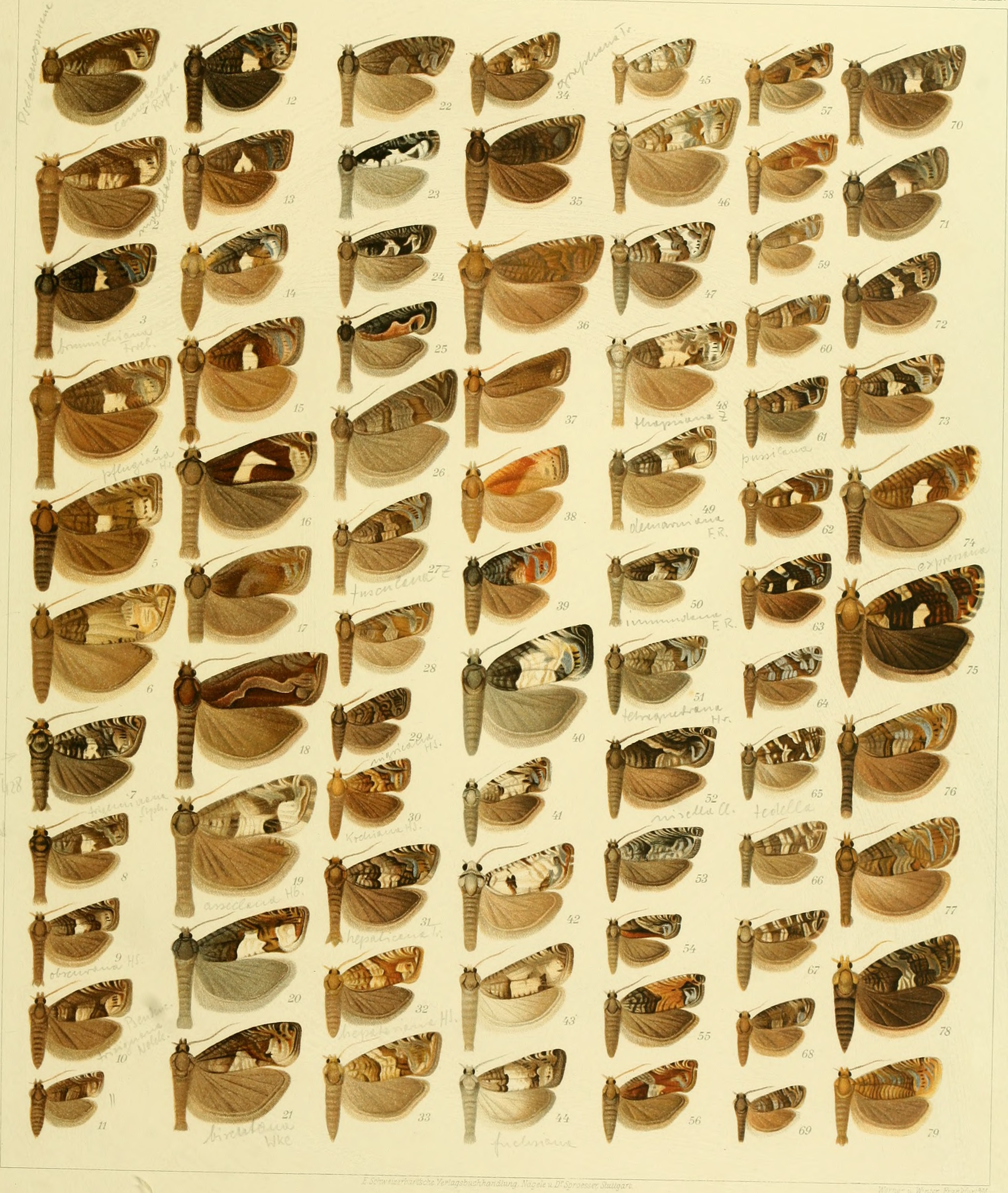
- In Kennel Die palaearktischen tortriciden figures 76, 77, 78, 79

Scientific classification
- Domain: Eukaryota
- Kingdom: Animalia
- Phylum: Arthropoda
- Class: Insecta
- Order: Lepidoptera
- Family: Tortricidae
- Genus: Epiblema
- Species: E. rimosana

Binomial name
- Epiblema rimosana (Christoph, 1882)

Synonyms
- Grapholitha rimosana Christoph, 1882; Epiblema bimaculosana Caradja, 1916; Grapholitha (Paedisca) rotundana Snellen, 1883

= Epiblema rimosana =

Species of moth

Epiblema rimosana is a species of moth of the family Tortricidae. It is found in China, Korea, Japan and Russia (South Siberian Mountains).
