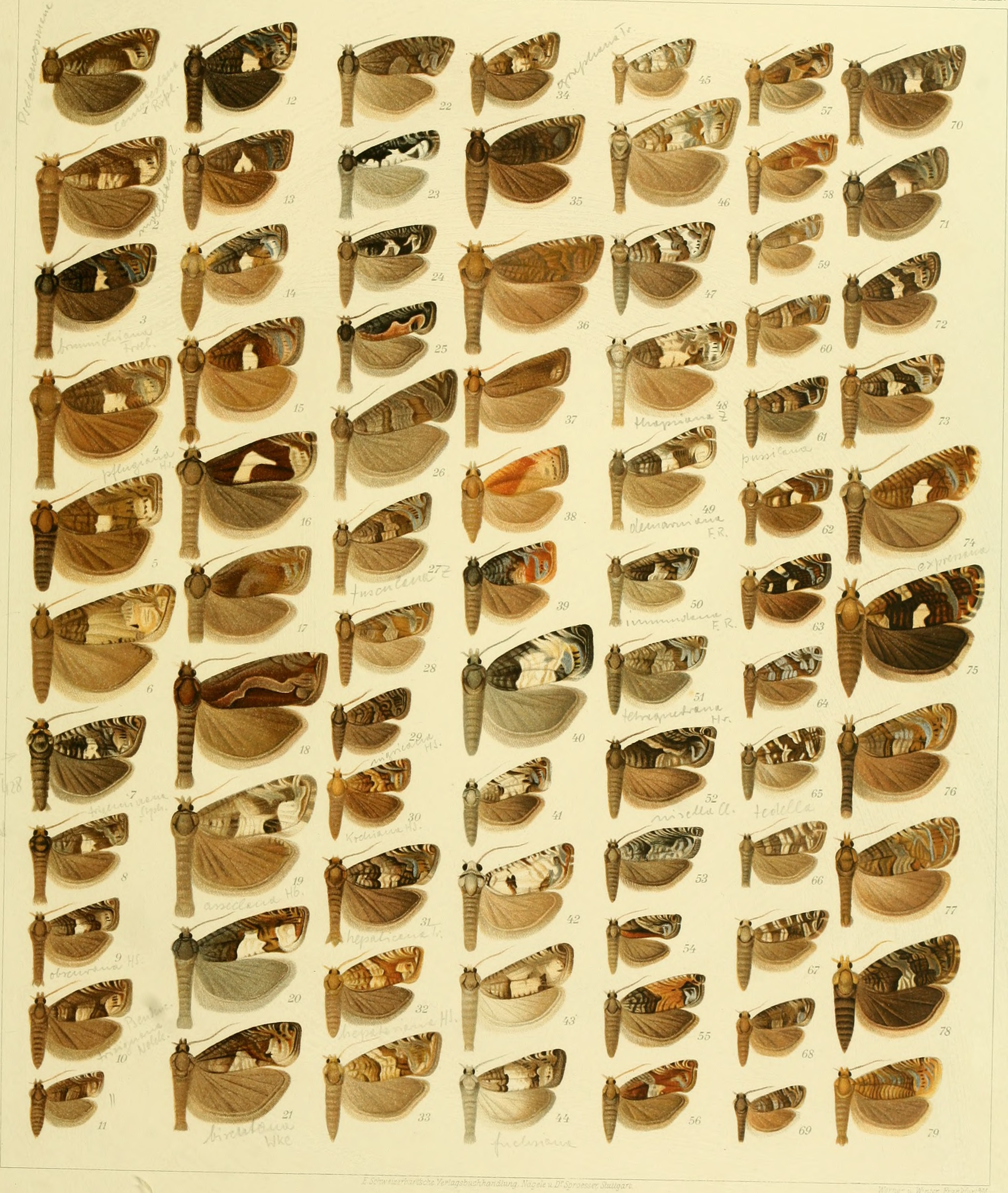
- in Kennel Die palaearktischen tortriciden figures 74, 75

Scientific classification
- Kingdom: Animalia
- Phylum: Arthropoda
- Clade: Pancrustacea
- Class: Insecta
- Order: Lepidoptera
- Family: Tortricidae
- Genus: Epiblema
- Species: E. expressana

Binomial name
- Epiblema expressana (Christoph, 1882)

Synonyms
- Grapholitha expressana Christoph, 1882; Epiblema contrasignana Kennel, 1921; Grapholitha contrasignata Christoph, 1882

= Epiblema expressana =

Species of moth

Epiblema expressana is a species of moth of the family Tortricidae. It is found in China (Jilin, Heilongjiang), Japan, Russia and Korea.
