= Epiblema cnicicolana =

Scientific classification
- Kingdom: Animalia
- Phylum: Arthropoda
- Clade: Pancrustacea
- Class: Insecta
- Order: Lepidoptera
- Family: Tortricidae
- Genus: Epiblema
- Species: E. cnicicolana

Binomial name
- Epiblema cnicicolana (Zeller, 1847)

Species of moth

Epiblema cnicicolana is a species of moth belonging to the family Tortricidae.

== Distribution ==
It is native to Western Europe.
