= Epiblema similana =

Scientific classification
- Domain: Eukaryota
- Kingdom: Animalia
- Phylum: Arthropoda
- Class: Insecta
- Order: Lepidoptera
- Family: Tortricidae
- Genus: Epiblema
- Species: E. similana

Binomial name
- Epiblema similana (Denis & Schiffermüller, 1775)

Species of moth

Epiblema similana is a moth belonging to the family Tortricidae. The species was first described by Michael Denis and Ignaz Schiffermüller in 1775.

It is native to Europe.
