= Lopidea ampla =

Scientific classification
- Kingdom: Animalia
- Phylum: Arthropoda
- Class: Insecta
- Order: Hemiptera
- Suborder: Heteroptera
- Family: Miridae
- Tribe: Orthotylini
- Genus: Lopidea
- Species: L. ampla

Binomial name
- Lopidea ampla Van Duzee, 1917

Species of true bug

Lopidea ampla is a species of plant bug in the family Miridae. It is found in North America.
