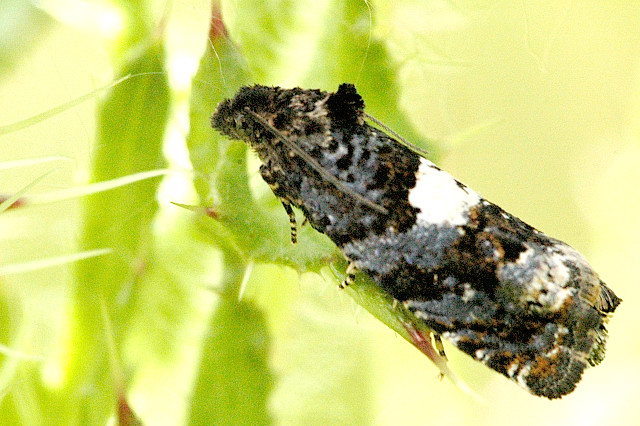

Scientific classification
- Kingdom: Animalia
- Phylum: Arthropoda
- Class: Insecta
- Order: Lepidoptera
- Family: Tortricidae
- Genus: Epiblema
- Species: E. scutulana

Binomial name
- Epiblema scutulana (Denis & Schiffermüller, 1775)

Synonyms
- Tortrix scutulana [Denis & Schiffermuller], 1775; Grapholitha pflugiana var. alsaticana Peyerimhoff, 1872; Ephippiphora luctuosana Duponchel, in Godart, 1835; Ephippiphora mortuana Doubleday, 1850; Ephippiphora novana Guenee, 1845; Tortrix pflugiana Haworth, [1811]; Eucosma pfugiana Wu, 1938

= Epiblema scutulana =

Species of moth

Epiblema scutulana is a moth of the family Tortricidae. It is found in the Palearctic realm. The species closely resembles Epiblema sticticana and Epiblema cirsiana, identification is only possible on the basis of microscopic examination of the genitalia.

The wingspan is 18–23 mm. The moth flies from May to September in western Europe.

The larvae feed on spear thistle and musk thistle.
