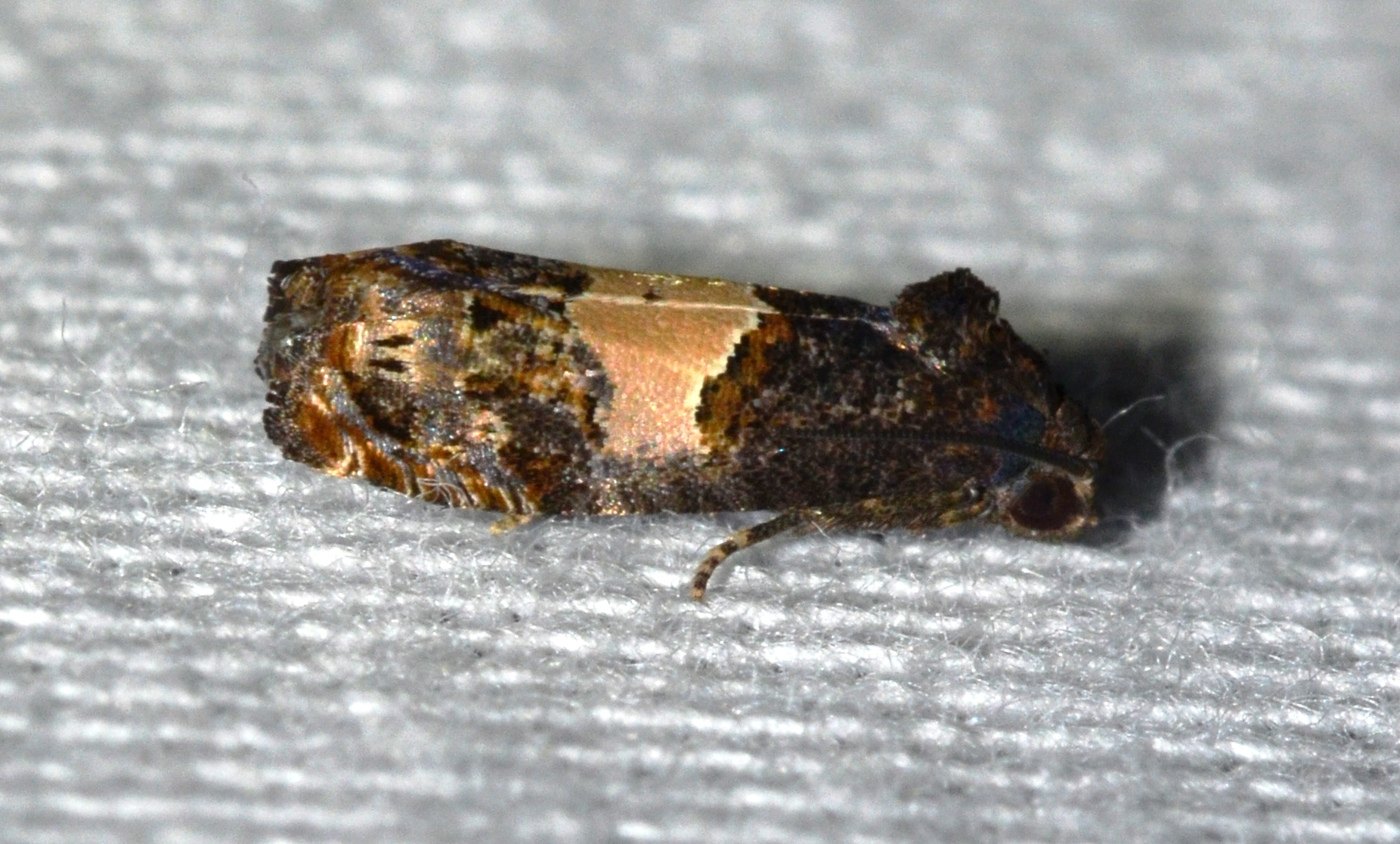

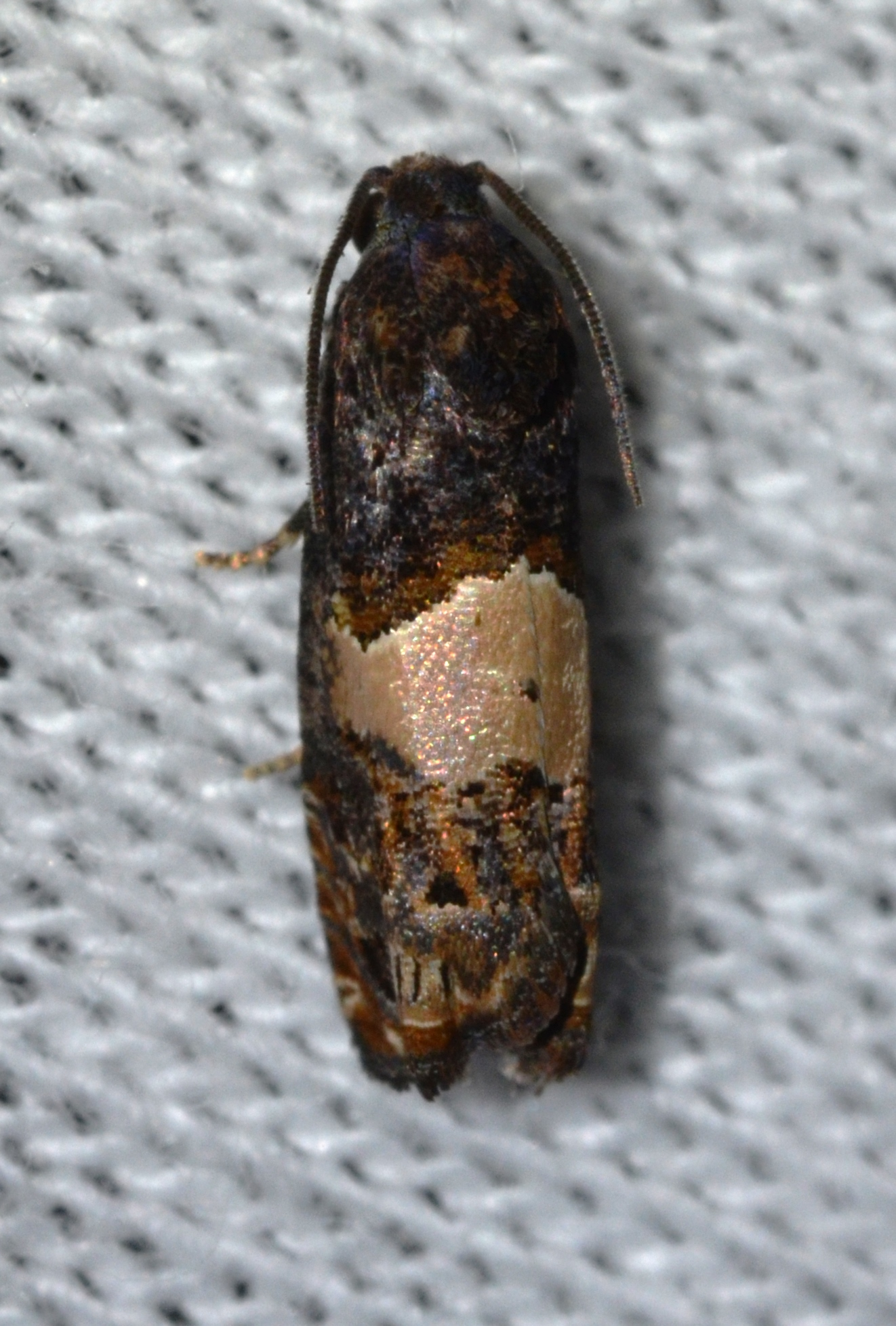

Scientific classification
- Domain: Eukaryota
- Kingdom: Animalia
- Phylum: Arthropoda
- Class: Insecta
- Order: Lepidoptera
- Family: Tortricidae
- Genus: Epiblema
- Species: E. glenni

Binomial name
- Epiblema glenni Wright, 2002

= Epiblema glenni =

Species of moth

Epiblema glenni, or Glenn's Epiblema is a species of moth of the family Tortricidae. It is found in North America, where it has been recorded from Illinois, Kentucky, Michigan, Missouri, North Carolina, Ohio and Tennessee.
