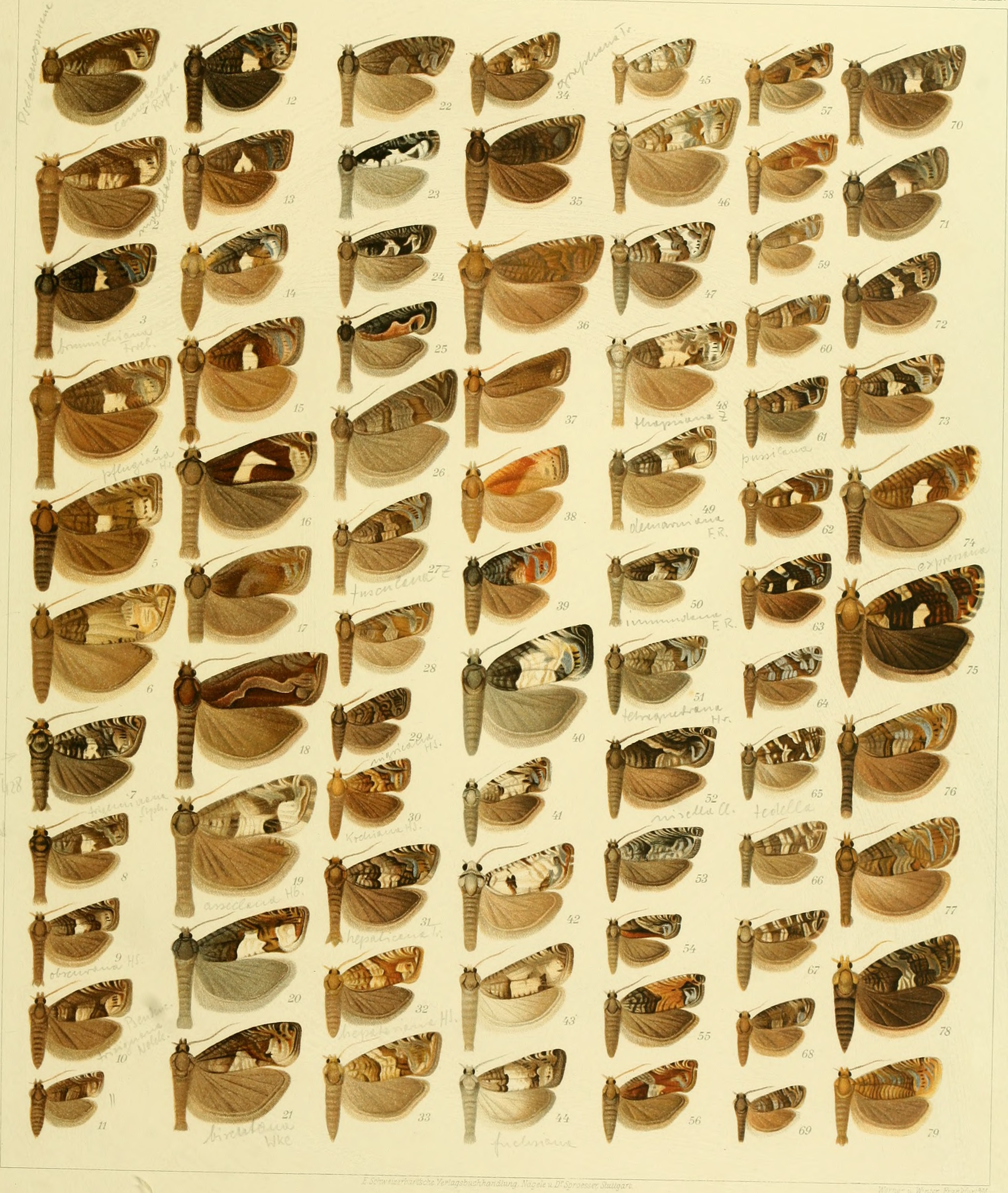
- in Kennel Die palaearktischen tortriciden figure 73

Scientific classification
- Kingdom: Animalia
- Phylum: Arthropoda
- Class: Insecta
- Order: Lepidoptera
- Family: Tortricidae
- Genus: Epiblema
- Species: E. acceptana

Binomial name
- Epiblema acceptana (Snellen, 1883)

Synonyms
- Grapholitha (Paedisca) acceptana Snellen, 1883

= Epiblema acceptana =

Species of moth

Epiblema acceptana is a species of moth of the family Tortricidae. It is found in China (Heilongjiang) and the Russian Far East (Amur).
