= Lopidea marginata =

Scientific classification
- Kingdom: Animalia
- Phylum: Arthropoda
- Class: Insecta
- Order: Hemiptera
- Suborder: Heteroptera
- Family: Miridae
- Tribe: Orthotylini
- Genus: Lopidea
- Species: L. marginata

Binomial name
- Lopidea marginata Uhler, 1894

Synonyms
- Lopidea drakei Knight, 1962

Species of true bug

Lopidea marginata is a species of plant bug in the family Miridae. It is found in Central America and North America.
