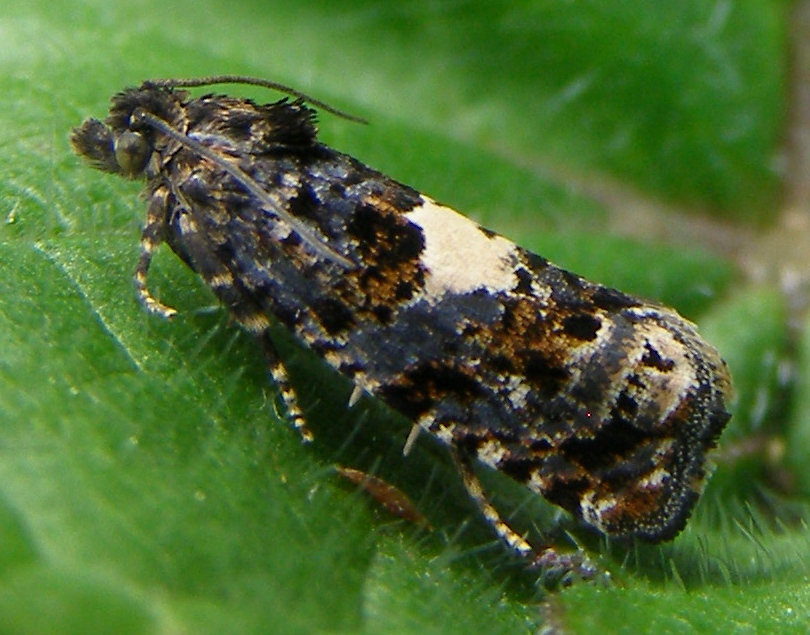
- Epiblema cf. cirsiana

Scientific classification
- Domain: Eukaryota
- Kingdom: Animalia
- Phylum: Arthropoda
- Class: Insecta
- Order: Lepidoptera
- Family: Tortricidae
- Tribe: Eucosmini
- Genus: Epiblema; Hübner, 1825

= Epiblema (moth) =

Genus of tortrix moths

Epiblema is a large genus of moths belonging to the subfamily Olethreutinae of the family Tortricidae. Most species occur in the Holarctic; a few in South Asia and Africa.

== Species ==
- Epiblema abruptana (Walsingham, 1879)
- Epiblema absconditana (Laharpe, 1860)
- Epiblema acceptana (Snellen, 1883)
- Epiblema albohamulana (Rebel, 1893)
- Epiblema alishana Kawabe, 1986
- Epiblema angulatana Kennel, 1901
- Epiblema aquana (Hubner, [1796-1799])
- Epiblema arizonana Powell, 1975
- Epiblema asseclana (Hubner, [1796-1799])
- Epiblema banghaasi Kennel, 1901
- Epiblema batangensis (Caradja, 1939)
- Epiblema benignatum McDunnough, 1925
- Epiblema boxcana (Kearfott, 1907)
- Epiblema brightonana (Kearfott, 1907)
- Epiblema carolinana (Walsingham, 1895)
- Epiblema charadrias Diakonoff, 1977
- Epiblema chretieni Obraztsov, 1952
- Epiblema chromata Miller, 1985
- Epiblema cirsiana (Zeller, 1843)
- Epiblema cnicicolana (Zeller, 1847)
- Epiblema concava Diakonoff, 1964
- Epiblema confusana (Herrich-Schäffer, 1856)
- Epiblema costipunctana (Haworth, [1811])
- Epiblema cretana Osthelder, 1941
- Epiblema damasceana (Tuleskov & Nikolova, 1967)
- Epiblema deflexana Heinrich, 1923
- Epiblema desertana (Zeller, 1875)
- Epiblema deverrae Brown in Brown & Powell, 1991
- Epiblema discretivana (Heinrich, 1921)
- Epiblema dorsisuffusana (Kearfott, 1908)
- Epiblema ermolenkoi Kuznetzov, 1968
- Epiblema exacerbatricana Heinrich, 1923
- Epiblema expressana (Christoph, 1882)
- Epiblema fiorii Turati, in Turati & Zanon, 1922
- Epiblema foenella (Linnaeus, 1758)
- Epiblema gammana (Mann, 1866)
- Epiblema gibsoni Wright & Covell, 2003
- Epiblema glenni Wright, 2002
- Epiblema grandaevana (Lienig & Zeller, 1846)
- Epiblema graphana (Treitschke, 1835)
- Epiblema grossbecki Heinrich, 1923
- Epiblema hepaticana (Treitschke, 1835)
- Epiblema hirsutana (Walsingham, 1879)
- Epiblema inconspicua (Walsingham, 1900)
- Epiblema infelix Heinrich, 1923
- Epiblema infuscatana Kennel, 1901
- Epiblema insidiosana Heinrich, 1923
- Epiblema inulivora (Meyrick, 1932)
- Epiblema iowana McDunnough, 1935
- Epiblema junctana (Herrich-Schäffer, 1856)
- Epiblema lasiovalva Razowski, 2006
- Epiblema leucopetra (Meyrick, 1908)
- Epiblema lochmoda Razowski, 2006
- Epiblema luctuosissima Blanchard, 1985
- Epiblema lyallana McDunnough, 1935
- Epiblema macneilli Powell, 1975
- Epiblema macrorris (Walsingham, 1900)
- Epiblema mendiculana (Treitschke, 1835)
- Epiblema numerosana (Zeller, 1875)
- Epiblema obfuscana (Dyar, 1903)
- Epiblema ochraceana Fernald, 1901
- Epiblema otiosana (Clemens, 1860)
- Epiblema periculosana Heinrich, 1923
- Epiblema porpota (Meyrick, 1907)
- Epiblema praesumptiosa Heinrich, 1923
- Epiblema pryerana (Walsingham, 1900)
- Epiblema quinquefasciana (Matsumura, 1900)
- Epiblema radicana (Walsingham, 1879)
- Epiblema radui St noiu & Nemes, 1974
- Epiblema ravana Kennel, 1900
- Epiblema resumptana (Walker, 1863)
- Epiblema riciniata (Meyrick, 1911)
- Epiblema rimosana (Christoph, 1882)
- Epiblema rudei Powell, 1975
- Epiblema sarmatana (Christoph, 1872)
- Epiblema scudderiana (Clemens, 1860)
- Epiblema scutulana ([Denis & Schiffermuller], 1775)
- Epiblema separationis Heinrich, 1923
- Epiblema similana ([Denis & Schiffermuller], 1775)
- Epiblema simploniana (Duponchel, in Godart, 1835)
- Epiblema sosana (Kearfott, 1907)
- Epiblema sticticana (Fabricius, 1794)
- Epiblema strenuana (Walker, 1863)
- Epiblema suffusana (Lienig & Zeller, 1846)
- Epiblema sugii Kawabe, 1976
- Epiblema symbolaspis (Meyrick, 1927)
- Epiblema tandana (Kearfott, 1907)
- Epiblema tripartitana (Zeller, 1875)
- Epiblema turbidana (Treitschke, 1835)
- Epiblema walsinghami (Kearfott, 1907)

== See also ==
- List of Tortricidae genera
