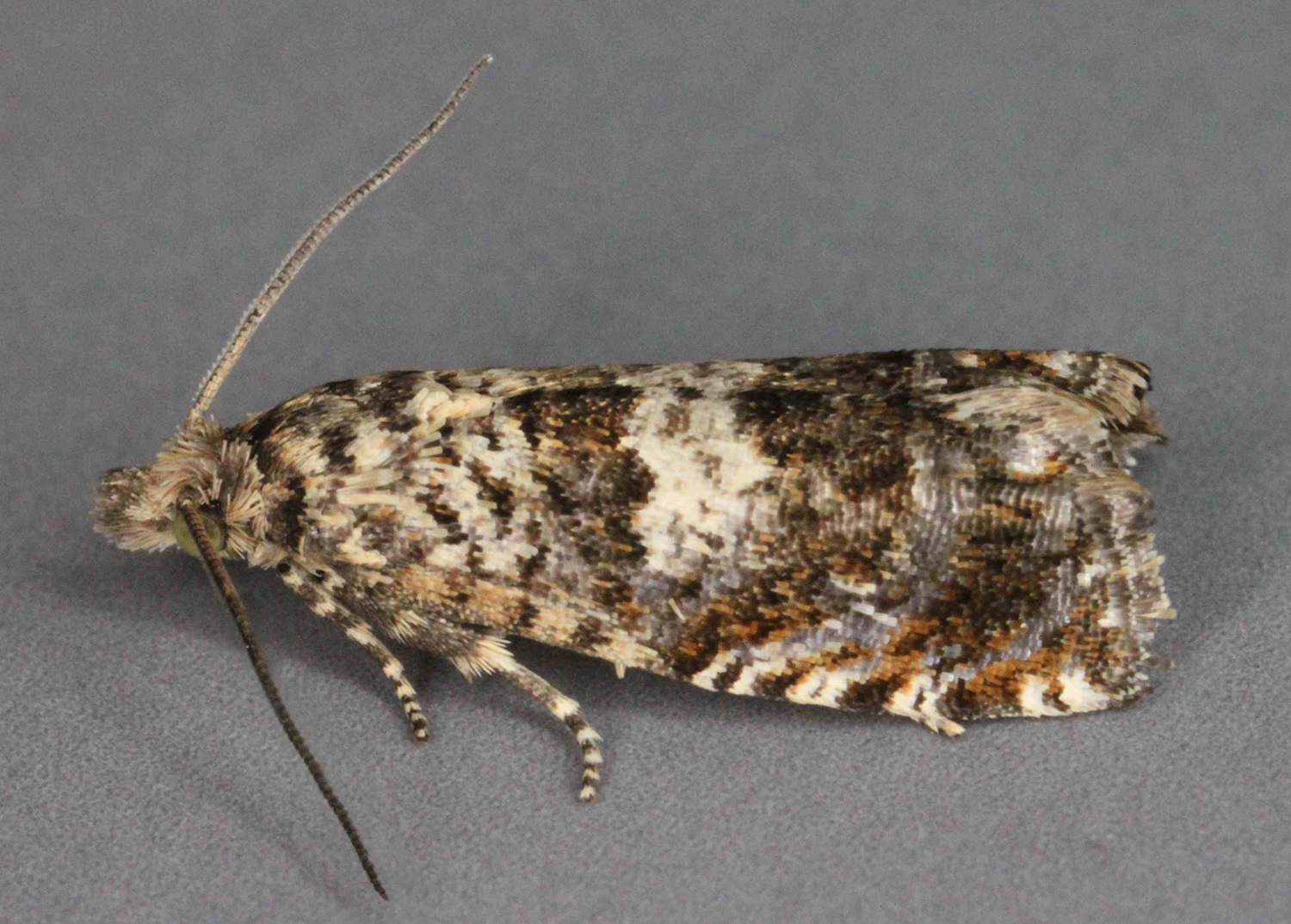

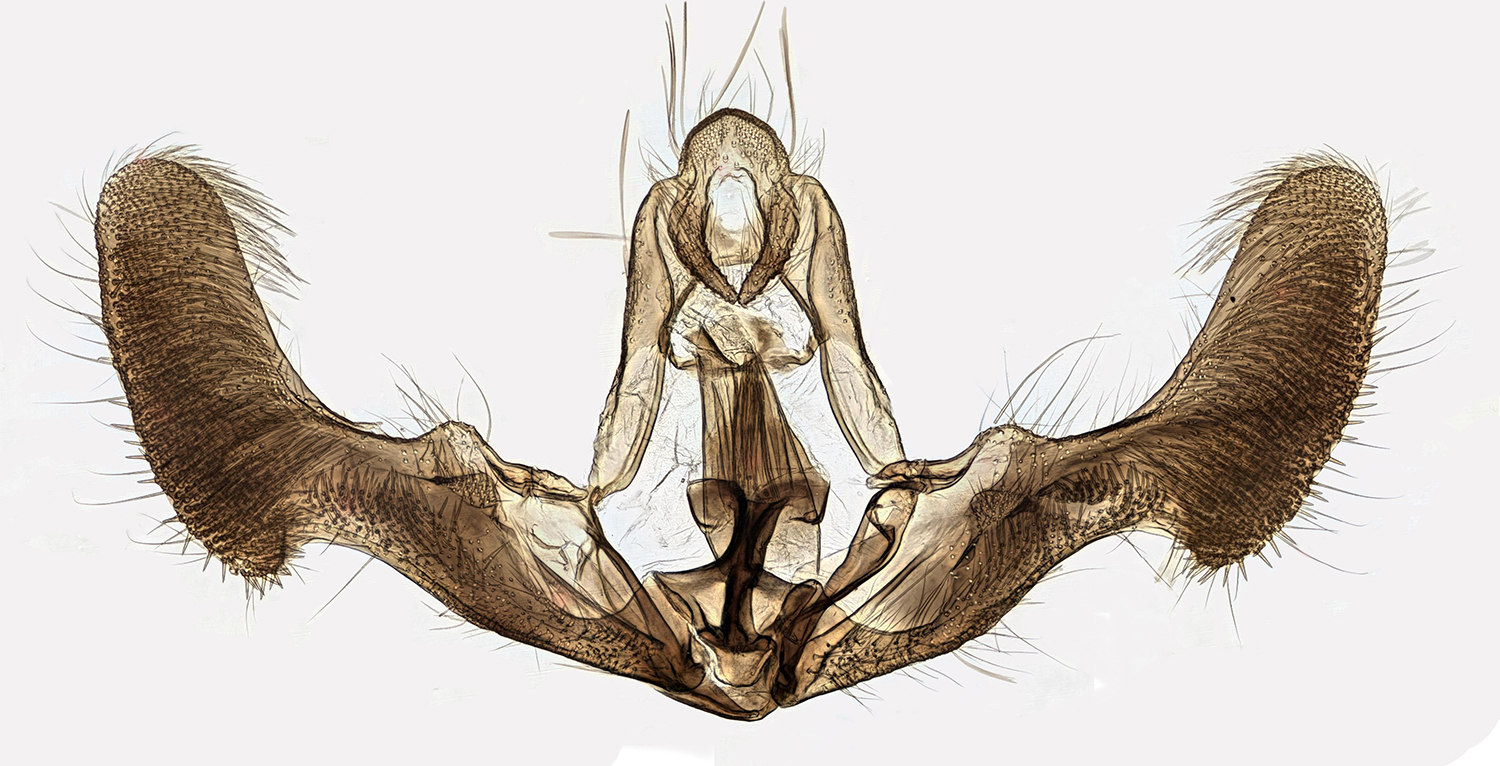
- Male genitalia

Scientific classification
- Kingdom: Animalia
- Phylum: Arthropoda
- Clade: Pancrustacea
- Class: Insecta
- Order: Lepidoptera
- Family: Tortricidae
- Genus: Epiblema
- Species: E. costipunctana

Binomial name
- Epiblema costipunctana (Haworth, 1811)

= Epiblema costipunctana =

Species of moth

Epiblema costipunctana is a species of moth belonging to the family Tortricidae. It is native to Europe.

The wingspan is 13-18mm.The forewings are fuscous, sometimes ochreous- tinged, irregularly marked with black. The costa is strigulated with black and white. Three streaks from costa and the margins of ocellus are leaden - metallic. The sharply angulated edge of basal patch and the central fascia are darker and separated by a somewhat pentagonal white dorsal blotch more or less strigulated with blackish. There is a suffused blackish spot before apex. The hindwings are fuscous, in male basally whitish, with terminal and broader dorsal blackish fascia, in female posteriorly darker fuscous. The larva is pinkish-white, sharply ringed with white; spots red; head brown; plate of 2 whitish or grey, posterior edge blackish.

The moths fly from May to July and again from late July to September. The larvae feed on Senecio jacobaea.
