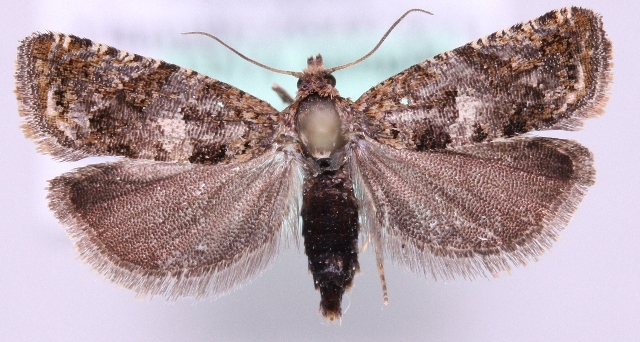

Scientific classification
- Domain: Eukaryota
- Kingdom: Animalia
- Phylum: Arthropoda
- Class: Insecta
- Order: Lepidoptera
- Family: Tortricidae
- Genus: Epiblema
- Species: E. graphana

Binomial name
- Epiblema graphana (Treitschke, 1835)

Synonyms
- Paedisca graphana Treitschke, 1835; Epiblema graphanum; Grapholitha pierretana Duponchel, in Godart, 1836

= Epiblema graphana =

Species of moth

Epiblema graphana is a species of moth of the family Tortricidae. It is found in Spain, France, Germany, the Benelux, Denmark, Austria, Switzerland, Italy, the Czech Republic, Slovakia, Poland, Norway, Sweden, Finland, the Baltic region, Albania, Romania, Bulgaria, Hungary, Slovenia, North Macedonia, Greece, the Near East, Russia, Kazakhstan, Iran, Afghanistan and China.

The wingspan is 12–15 mm. Adults are on wing from May to September in two generations in western Europe.

The larvae feed on Achillea millefolium and Artemisia species.
