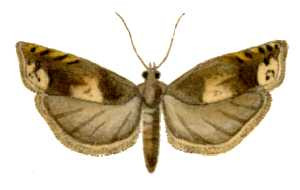

Scientific classification
- Kingdom: Animalia
- Phylum: Arthropoda
- Class: Insecta
- Order: Lepidoptera
- Family: Tortricidae
- Genus: Epiblema
- Species: E. strenuana

Binomial name
- Epiblema strenuana (Walker, 1863)

Synonyms
- Steganoptycha flavocellana Clemens, 1865; Epiblema exvagana (Walker, 1863); Epiblema flavocellana (Clemens, 1865); Epiblema subversana (Zeller, 1875); Epiblema minutana (Kearfott, 1905); Epiblema antaxia (Meyrick, 1920)

= Epiblema strenuana =

Species of moth

Epiblema strenuana, the stem-galling moth or ragweed borer, is a moth of the family Tortricidae. It is endemic to North America, but was introduced to Australia from Mexico to control the weeds of the family Asteraceae (Xanthium occidentale, Ambrosia artemisiifolia and Parthenium hysterophorus) in 1982. It is occasionally misspelled as Epiblema strenuanum.

The wingspan is about 15 mm.

The larvae mainly feed on Asteraceae species, including Ambrosia and Xanthium. It has also been recorded on Chenopodium species.
