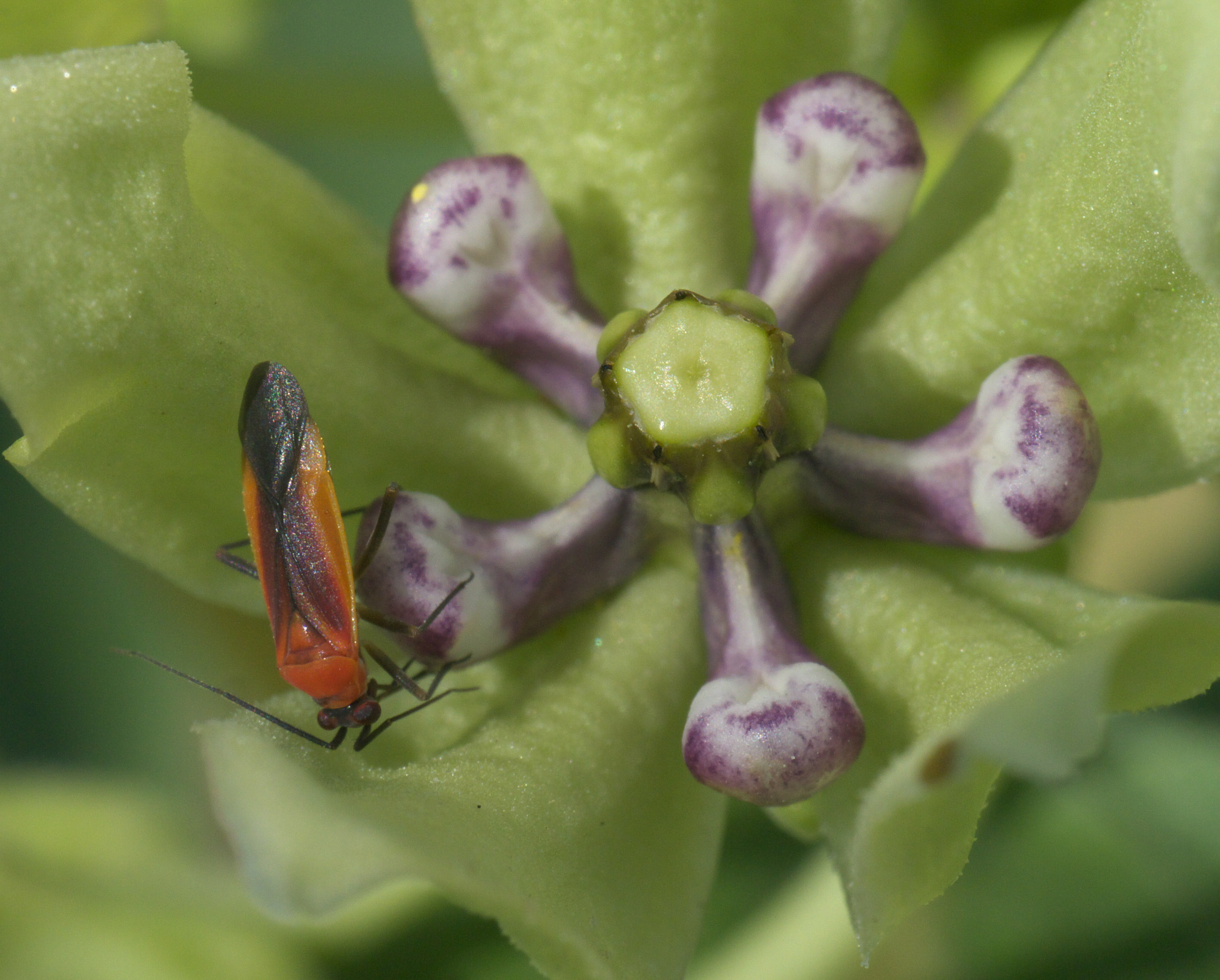

Scientific classification
- Kingdom: Animalia
- Phylum: Arthropoda
- Clade: Pancrustacea
- Class: Insecta
- Order: Hemiptera
- Suborder: Heteroptera
- Family: Miridae
- Subfamily: Orthotylinae
- Tribe: Orthotylini
- Genus: Lopidea; Uhler, 1872

Synonyms
- Lomatopleura Reuter, 1876

= Lopidea =

Genus of true bugs

Lopidea is a genus of plant bugs in the family Miridae. There are more than 90 described species in Lopidea.

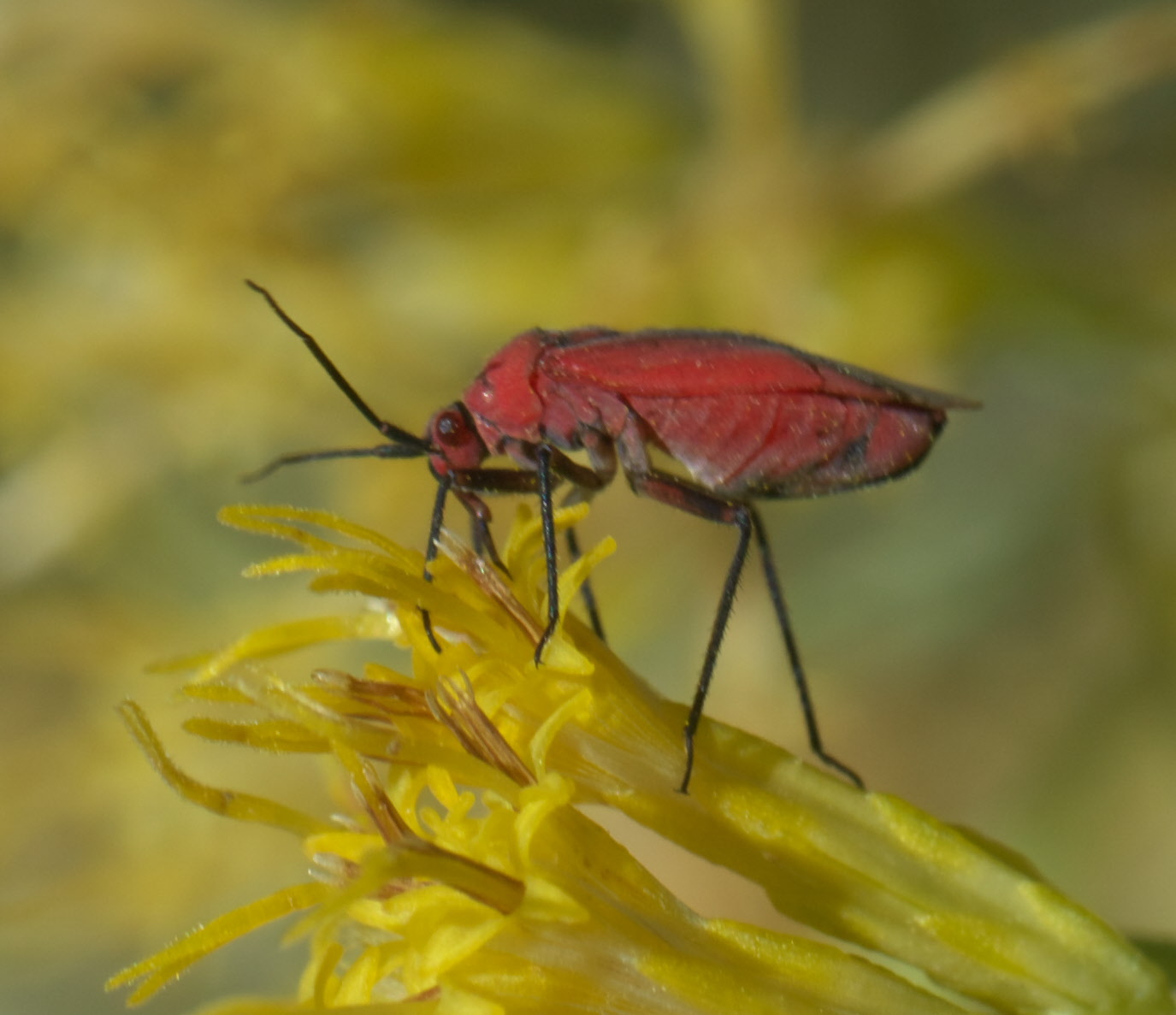

== Species ==
These 93 species belong to the genus Lopidea:

- Lopidea albicostata Knight & Schaffner, 1968
- Lopidea ampla Van Duzee, 1917
- Lopidea anisacanthi Knight, 1962
- Lopidea apache Knight, 1918
- Lopidea arizonae Knight, 1918
- Lopidea austrina Knight & Schaffner, 1975
- Lopidea balli Knight, 1923
- Lopidea barberi Knight, 1962
- Lopidea bellula Distant, 1883
- Lopidea bicolor Distant, 1893
- Lopidea bifurca Van Duzee, 1921
- Lopidea bispinosa Knight, 1965
- Lopidea bonanza Asquith, 1991
- Lopidea bullata Knight, 1923
- Lopidea caesar (Reuter, 1876)
- Lopidea chandleri Moore, 1956
- Lopidea chiapasi Knight & Schaffner, 1968
- Lopidea confluenta (Say, 1832)
- Lopidea confraterna (Gibson, 1918)
- Lopidea cuneata Van Duzee, 1910
- Lopidea dakota Knight, 1923
- Lopidea davisi Knight, 1917
- Lopidea dawsoni Knight, 1965
- Lopidea desertina Knight & Schaffner, 1972
- Lopidea eremita Van Duzee, 1921
- Lopidea falcata Knight, 1923
- Lopidea falcicula Knight, 1923
- Lopidea fuscosa Knight, 1968
- Lopidea gainesi Knight, 1918
- Lopidea garryae Knight, 1918
- Lopidea gemina Knight & Schaffner, 1972
- Lopidea guatemalana Knight & Schaffner, 1975
- Lopidea heidemanni Knight, 1917
- Lopidea hesperus (Kirkaldy, 1902)
- Lopidea igualae Knight & Schaffner, 1968
- Lopidea incurva Knight, 1918
- Lopidea indigena Knight & Schaffner, 1972
- Lopidea instabilis (Reuter, 1909)
- Lopidea intermedia Knight, 1918
- Lopidea jalpani Knight & Schaffner, 1972
- Lopidea jaurezi Knight & Schaffner, 1972
- Lopidea juarezi Knight
- Lopidea knighti T.Henry, 1985
- Lopidea lateralis Knight, 1918
- Lopidea lathyri Knight, 1923
- Lopidea lutea Knight, 1965
- Lopidea luteola Knight & Schaffner, 1968
- Lopidea major Knight, 1918 (Red Mountain laurel mirid)
- Lopidea marginalis (Reuter, 1909)
- Lopidea marginanda (Distant, 1883)
- Lopidea marginata Uhler, 1894
- Lopidea media (Say, 1832)
- Lopidea mexicana Distant, 1893
- Lopidea meyeri Knight & Schaffner, 1968
- Lopidea miniata Knight & Schaffner, 1975
- Lopidea minima Knight, 1918
- Lopidea minor Knight, 1918
- Lopidea mixteca Knight & Schaffner, 1972
- Lopidea mohave Knight, 1923
- Lopidea mucronata Knight, 1965
- Lopidea murrayi Knight & Schaffner, 1975
- Lopidea nicholella Knight, 1965
- Lopidea nicholi Knight, 1923
- Lopidea nigridia Uhler, 1895
- Lopidea oaxacana Knight & Schaffner, 1975
- Lopidea pacifica Knight & Schaffner, 1975
- Lopidea parva (Distant, 1883)
- Lopidea parvula Knight & Schaffner, 1972
- Lopidea picta Knight, 1918
- Lopidea pteleae Knight & Schaffner, 1968
- Lopidea pueblana Knight & Schaffner, 1975
- Lopidea puella Van Duzee, 1921
- Lopidea robiniae (Uhler, 1861)
- Lopidea robusta (Uhler, 1894)
- Lopidea rostrata Knight, 1965
- Lopidea salicis Knight, 1917
- Lopidea sayi Knight, 1918
- Lopidea schaffneri Knight, 1965
- Lopidea scitula (Walker, 1873)
- Lopidea scutata Knight, 1962
- Lopidea setosa Knight & Schaffner, 1968
- Lopidea splendida Knight & Schaffner, 1975
- Lopidea staphyleae Knight, 1917
- Lopidea subperiscopa Knight & Schaffner, 1968
- Lopidea taurina Van Duzee, 1921
- Lopidea tehuacana Knight & Schaffner, 1975
- Lopidea teton Knight, 1923
- Lopidea tolteci Knight & Schaffner, 1972
- Lopidea tridigitata Knight, 1965
- Lopidea ute Knight, 1923
- Lopidea wileyae Knight, 1923
- Lopidea wileyi Knight, 1923
- Lopidea zapoteci Knight & Schaffner, 1972
