= Epiblema lasiovalva =

Scientific classification
- Domain: Eukaryota
- Kingdom: Animalia
- Phylum: Arthropoda
- Class: Insecta
- Order: Lepidoptera
- Family: Tortricidae
- Genus: Epiblema
- Species: E. lasiovalva

Binomial name
- Epiblema lasiovalva Razowski, 2006

Species of moth

Epiblema lasiovalva is a species of moth of the family Tortricidae. It is found in India (Jammu and Kashmir).

The wingspan is about 20 millimetres (0.79 in).
