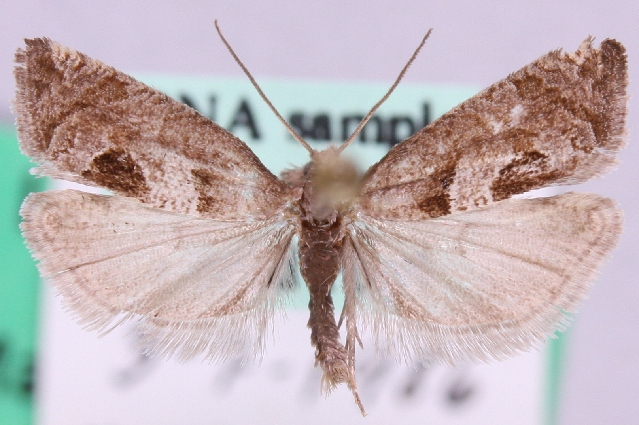

Scientific classification
- Domain: Eukaryota
- Kingdom: Animalia
- Phylum: Arthropoda
- Class: Insecta
- Order: Lepidoptera
- Family: Tortricidae
- Genus: Epiblema
- Species: E. junctana

Binomial name
- Epiblema junctana (Herrich-Schäffer, 1856)

Synonyms
- Notocelia junctana Herrich-Schäffer, 1856; Epiblema junctanum; Aspis jaspidana Christoph, 1872; Epiblema maculiferana Kennel, 1900

= Epiblema junctana =

Species of moth

Epiblema junctana is a species of moth of the family Tortricidae. It is found in Sweden, Denmark, Germany, Austria, the Czech Republic, Slovakia, Poland, Bulgaria, Romania, Hungary, Ukraine, the Near East, Russia, Kazakhstan, Iran, Central Asia and China (Henan).

The wingspan is 11–18 mm. Adults are on wing from May to July in western Europe.

The larvae feed on Inula salicina.
