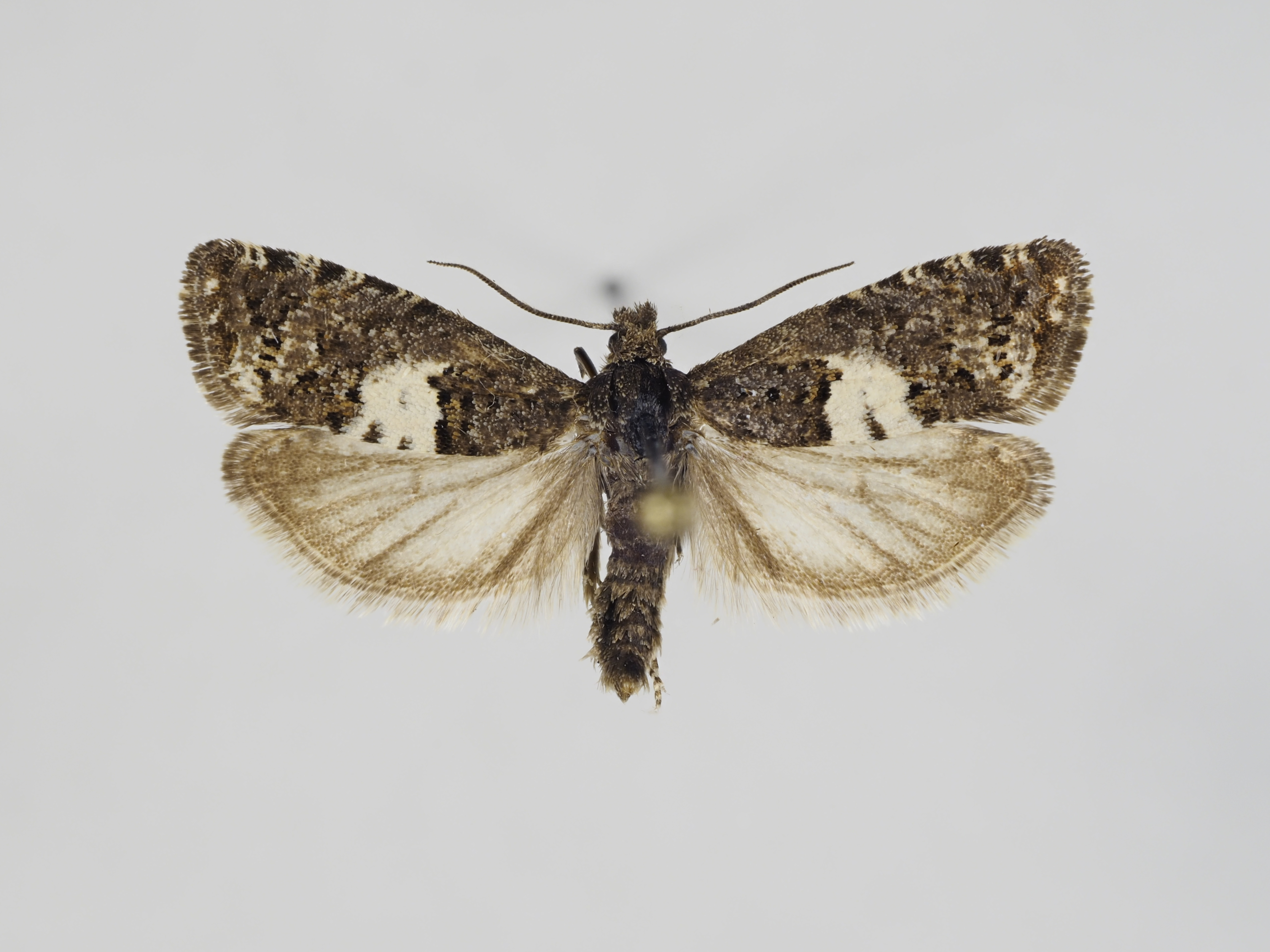

Scientific classification
- Domain: Eukaryota
- Kingdom: Animalia
- Phylum: Arthropoda
- Class: Insecta
- Order: Lepidoptera
- Family: Tortricidae
- Genus: Epiblema
- Species: E. simploniana

Binomial name
- Epiblema simploniana (Duponchel, 1835)

= Epiblema simploniana =

Species of moth

Epiblema simploniana is a species of moth belonging to the family Tortricidae.

It is native to Europe and Northwestern America.
