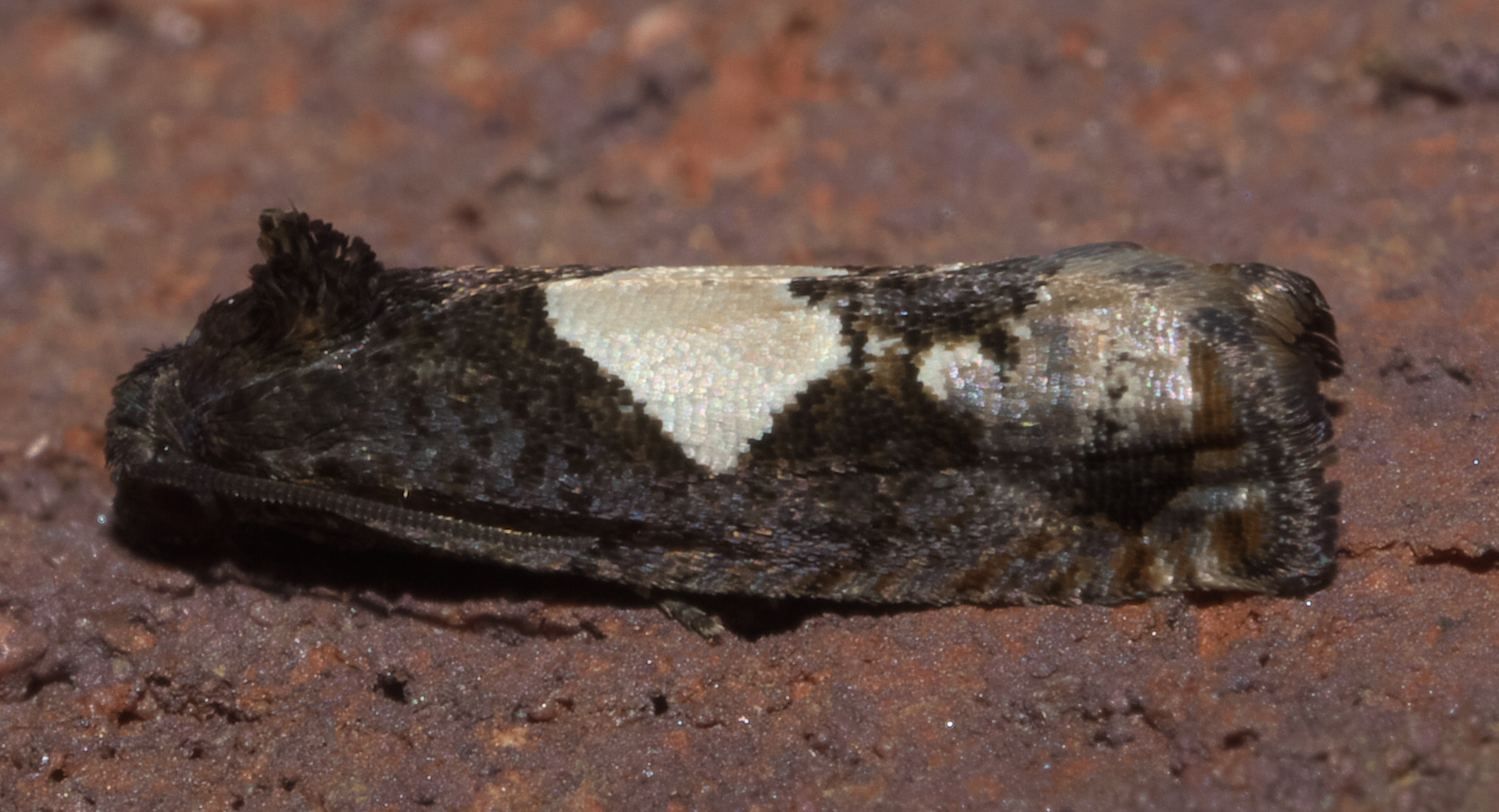

Scientific classification
- Kingdom: Animalia
- Phylum: Arthropoda
- Clade: Pancrustacea
- Class: Insecta
- Order: Lepidoptera
- Family: Tortricidae
- Genus: Epiblema
- Species: E. otiosana

Binomial name
- Epiblema otiosana (Clemens, 1860)

= Epiblema otiosana =

Bidens borer

Species of moth

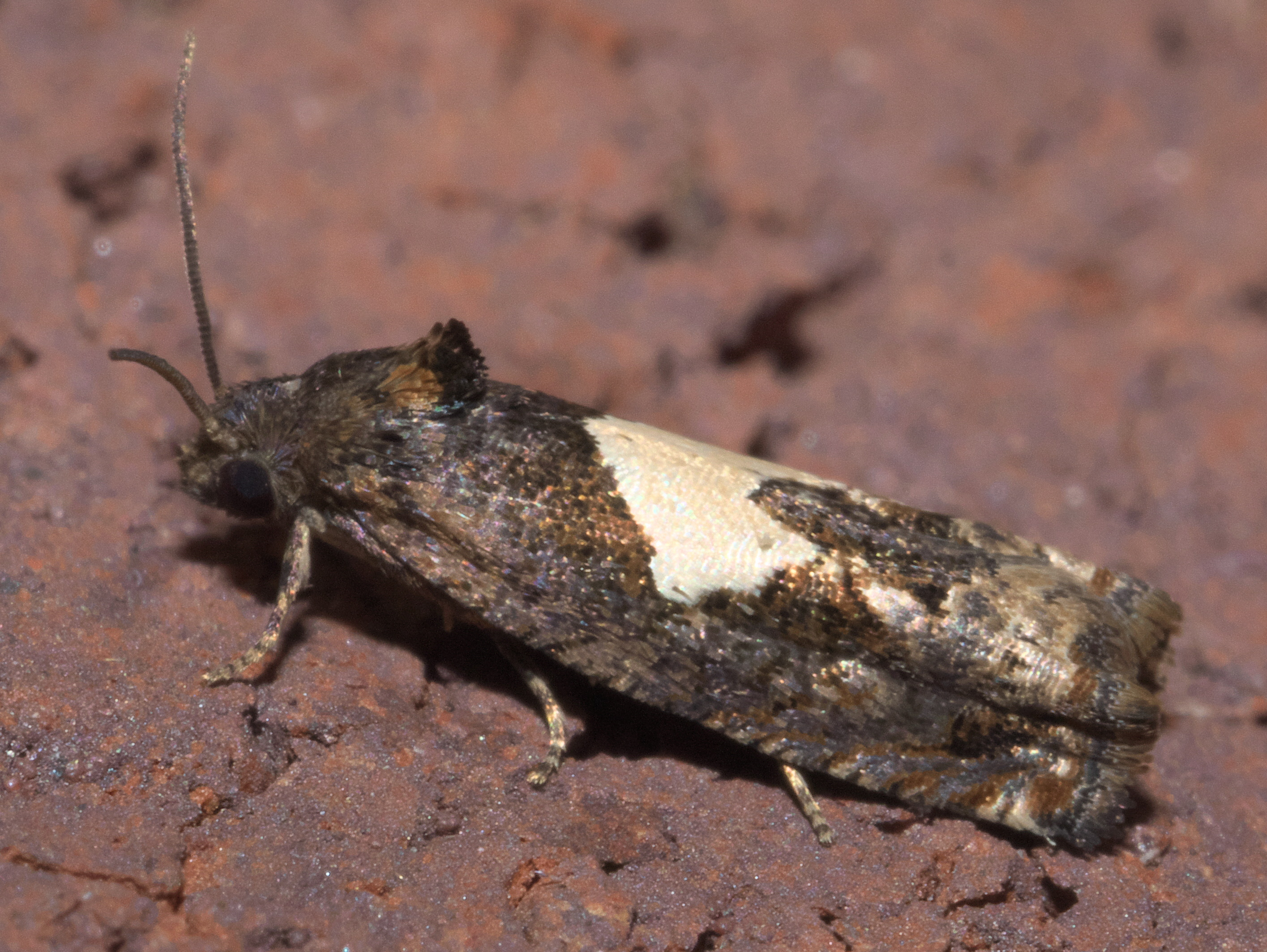
Epiblema otiosana, bidens borer, size: 8.3 millimetres (0.33 in)

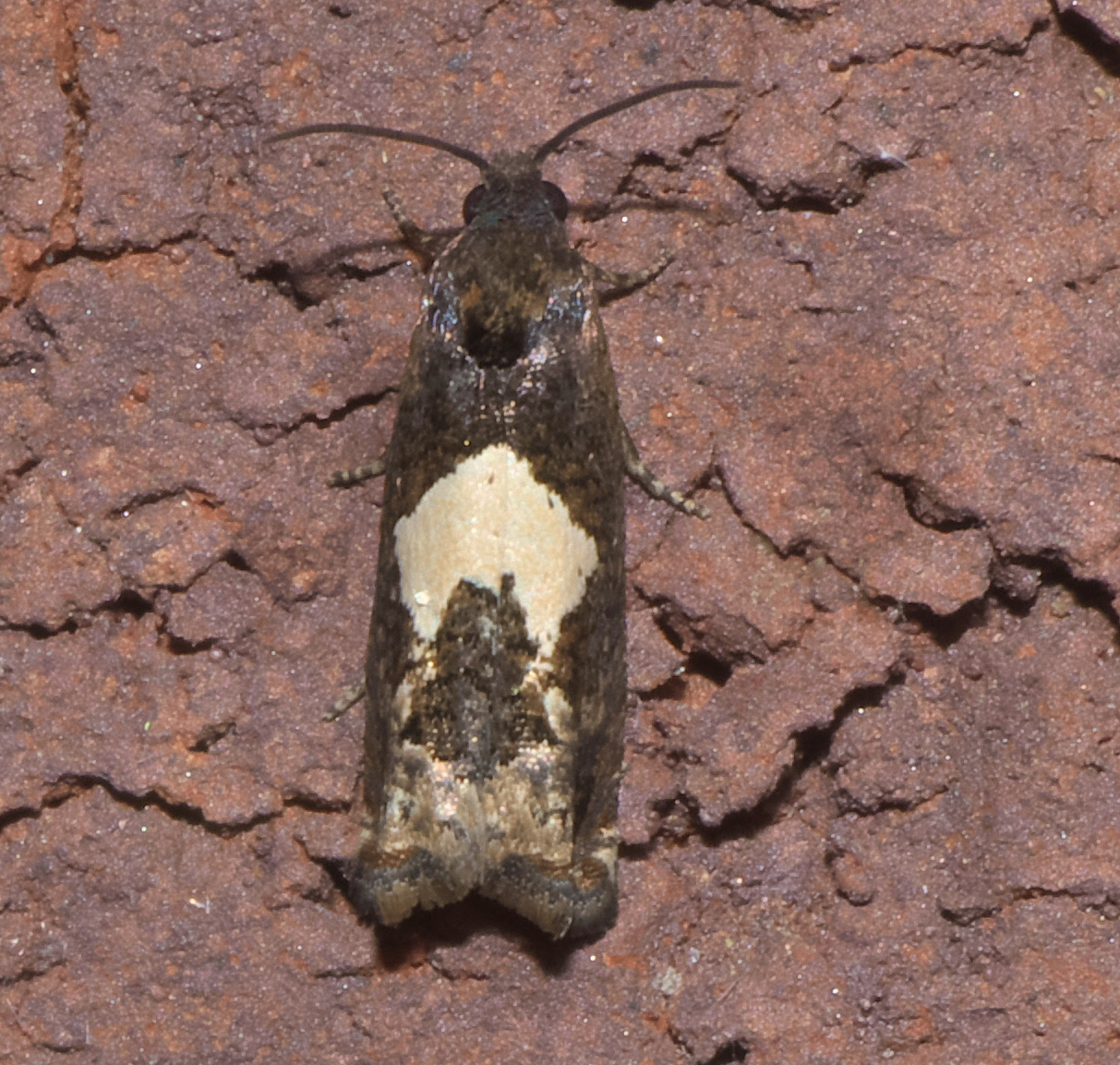
Epiblema otiosana, bidens borer

Epiblema otiosana, the bidens borer moth, gets its common name from the genus Bidens which includes the food plants for the larva. An adults wingspan ranges from 12 to 20 millimetres (0.47 to 0.79 in). They range in North America from Maine and Ontario in the north, south to Florida and west to Kansas and Texas.

The caterpillars feed on the Common Beggar-Ticks Bidens frondosa, a plant of the Aster family (Asteraceae).
