= Epiblema banghaasi =

Scientific classification
- Domain: Eukaryota
- Kingdom: Animalia
- Phylum: Arthropoda
- Class: Insecta
- Order: Lepidoptera
- Family: Tortricidae
- Genus: Epiblema
- Species: E. banghaasi

Binomial name
- Epiblema banghaasi Kennel, 1901

Species of moth

Epiblema banghaasi is a species of moth of the family Tortricidae. It is found in China (Heilongjiang) and Russia.
