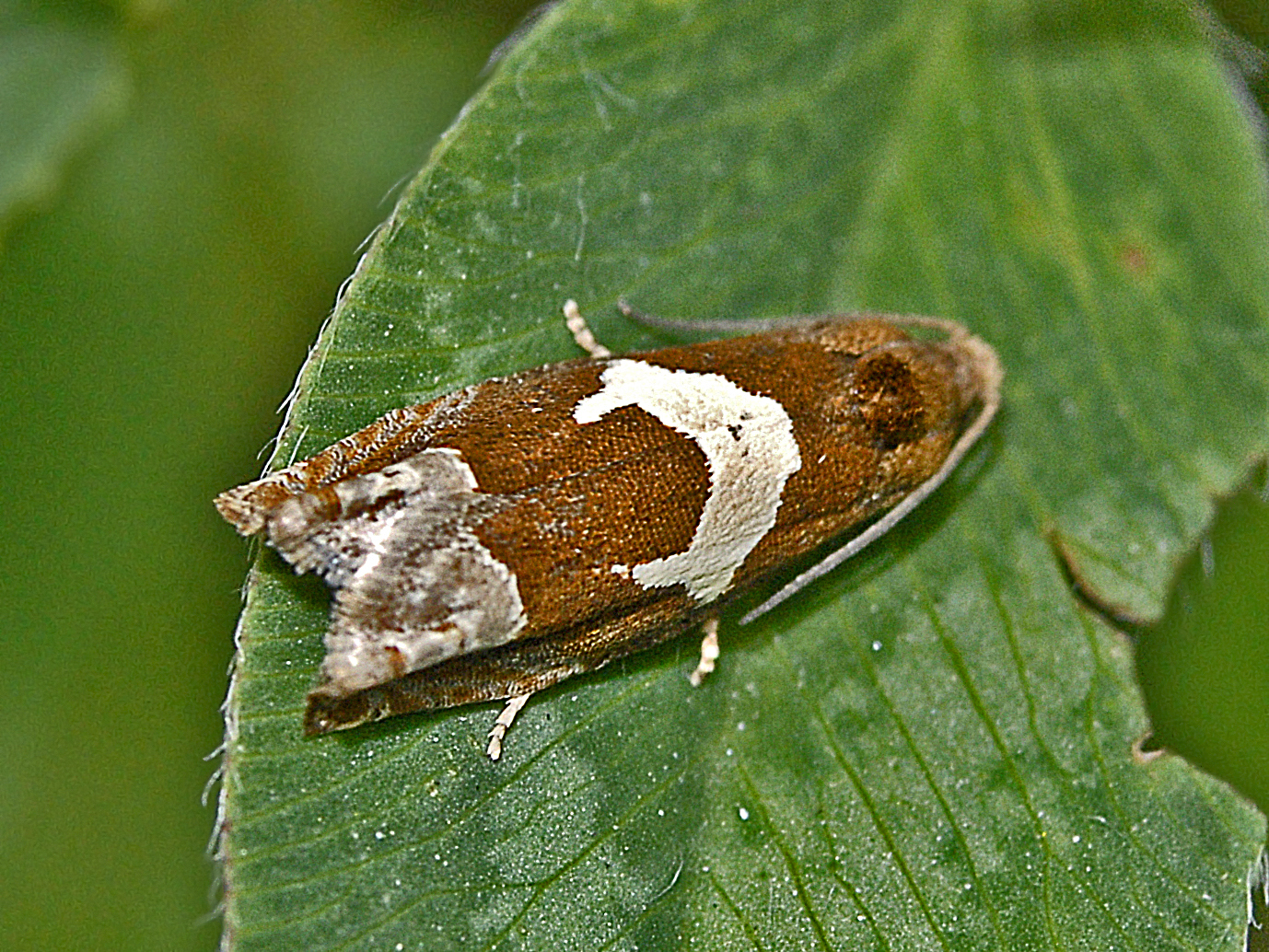

Scientific classification
- Kingdom: Animalia
- Phylum: Arthropoda
- Class: Insecta
- Order: Lepidoptera
- Family: Tortricidae
- Genus: Epiblema
- Species: E. foenella

Binomial name
- Epiblema foenella (Linnaeus, 1758)

= Epiblema foenella =

Species of moth

Epiblema foenella, the white-foot bell, is a moth of the family Tortricidae.

== Description ==
The wingspan is 17–26 mm. This quite-common moth has dark brown forewings with a striking falcate medio-dorsal white marking and a gray-colored area at the ends of the wings. The shape of the white marking is quite variable.

This species has one generation and the mature caterpillars overwinter. The larvae feed on the roots and lower stem of mugwort or common wormwood (Artemisia vulgaris), of southernwood (Artemisia abrotanum) and of golden marguerite (Anthemis tinctoria). The moth flies from May to August depending on the location. They usually fly from late afternoon into the evening.

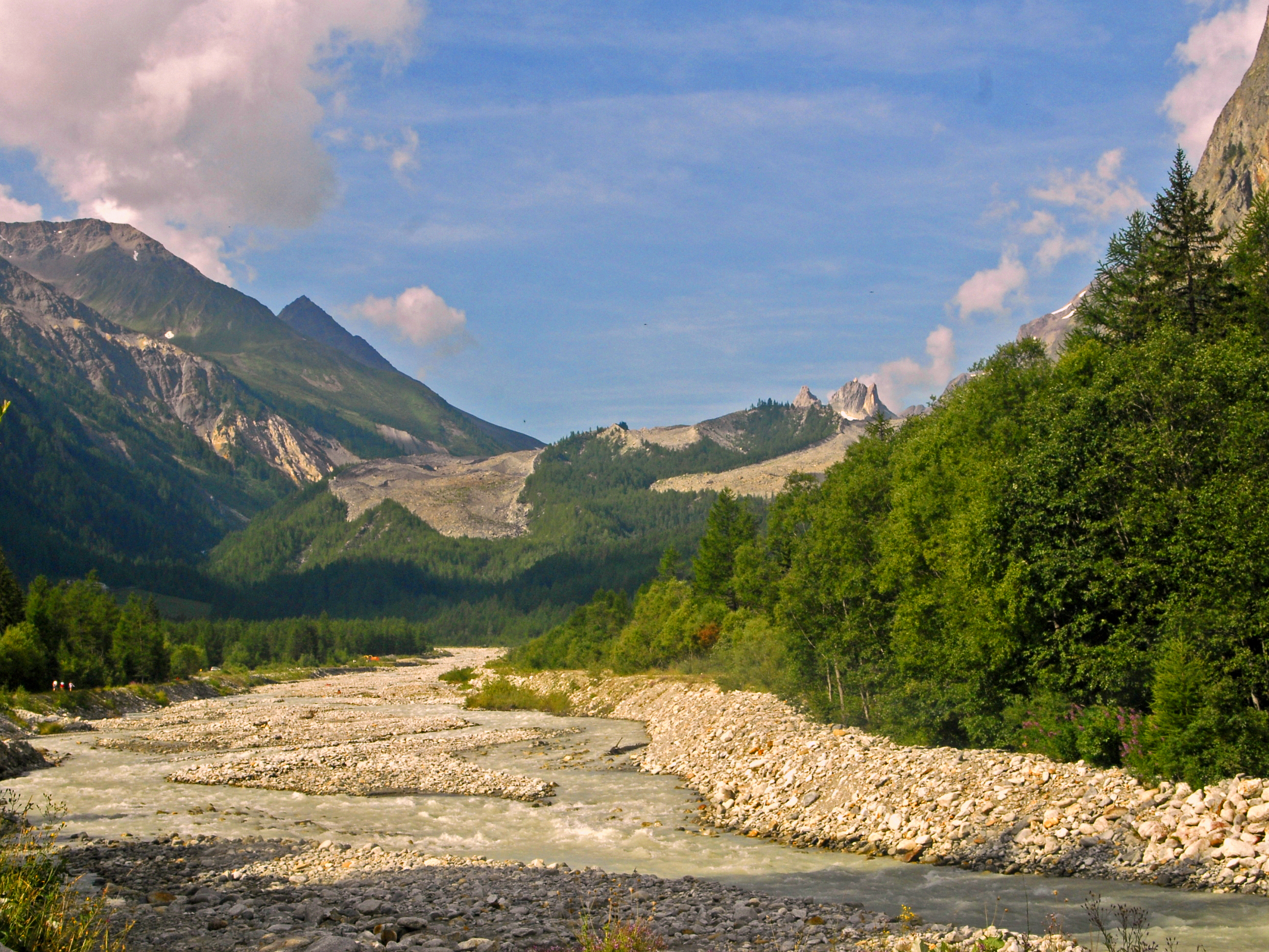
River banks in Val Veny, about 1600 m above sea level, habitat of Epiblema foenella

== Distribution ==
This species can be found in most of Europe, southern Russia, the Caucasus, Siberia, Kazakhstan, Kyrgyzstan, Mongolia, the Russian Far East, China (Tianjin, Hebei, Inner Mongolia, Jilin, Heilongjiang, Jiangsu, Zhejiang, Anhui, Fujian, Jiangxi, Shandong, Henan, Hubei, Hunan, Guangxi, Sichuan, Guizhou, Yunnan, Shaanxi, Gansu, Qinghai, Ningxia, Xinjiang), Korea, Japan, India, Taiwan and Vietnam.

== Habitat ==
The white-foot bell prefers rough uncultivated ground, grassland, scrub, river banks and coastal cliffs.

== Synonyms ==
- Ephippiphora faeneana Guenee, 1845
- Epiblema accentana Caradja, 1916
- Epiblema acclivilla Uffeln, 1912
- Epiblema albrechtella Meyer, 1911
- Epiblema circumflexa Caradja, 1916
- Epiblema confluens Wörz, 1953
- Epiblema divisa Wörz, 1953
- Epiblema effusana Uffeln, 1912
- Epiblema focnella Escherich, 1931
- Epiblema foenella ab. accentana Caradja, 1916
- Epiblema foenella ab. albrechtella Meyer, 1911
- Epiblema foenella ab. circumflexana Caradja, 1916
- Epiblema foenella ab. separana Krulikowsky, 1908
- Epiblema foenella f. acclivella Uffeln, 1912
- Epiblema foenella f. confluens Wrz, 1953
- Epiblema foenella f. divisa Wrz, 1953
- Epiblema foenella f. effusana Uffeln, 1912
- Epiblema foenella f. fracta Popescu-Gorj, 1965
- Epiblema foenella f. fuscata Wrz, 1953
- Epiblema foenella f. interrupta Wurz, 1953
- Epiblema foenella f. trapezoidalis Popescu-Gorj, 1965
- Epiblema foenella f. unicolor Uffeln, 1912
- Epiblema fracta Popescu-Gorj, 1965
- Epiblema fuscata Wörz, 1953
- Epiblema interrupta Wörz, 1953
- Epiblema separana Krulikovski, 1905
- Epiblema trapezoidalis Popescu-Gorj, 1965
- Epiblema unicolor Uffeln, 1912
- Epiblema unicolorana Klemensiewicz, 1906
- Grapholita clavigerana Walker, 1863
- Grapholitha foenella ab. unicolorana Klemensiewicz, 1900
- Paedisca foeneana Treitschke, 1830
- Phalaena (Tinea) foenella Linnaeus, 1758
- Phalaena (Tortrix) tibialana Hubner, 1793
- Phalaena fonella Zeller, 1853
- Phalaena hochenwartiana Scopoli, 1772
- Phalaena interrogationana Donovan, [1793]
- Pyralis pflugiana Fabricius, 1787
- Sciaphila sinicana Walker, 1863
- Tortrix foenana Haworth, [1811]
- Tortrix scopoliana [Denis & Schiffermuller], 1775
- Tortrix tibialana Hübner , 1796
