= Epiblema angulatana =

Scientific classification
- Domain: Eukaryota
- Kingdom: Animalia
- Phylum: Arthropoda
- Class: Insecta
- Order: Lepidoptera
- Family: Tortricidae
- Genus: Epiblema
- Species: E. angulatana

Binomial name
- Epiblema angulatana (Kennel, 1901)

Species of insect

Epiblema angulatana is a moth belonging to the family Tortricidae. The species was first described by Julius von Kennel in 1901.

It is native to Russia.
