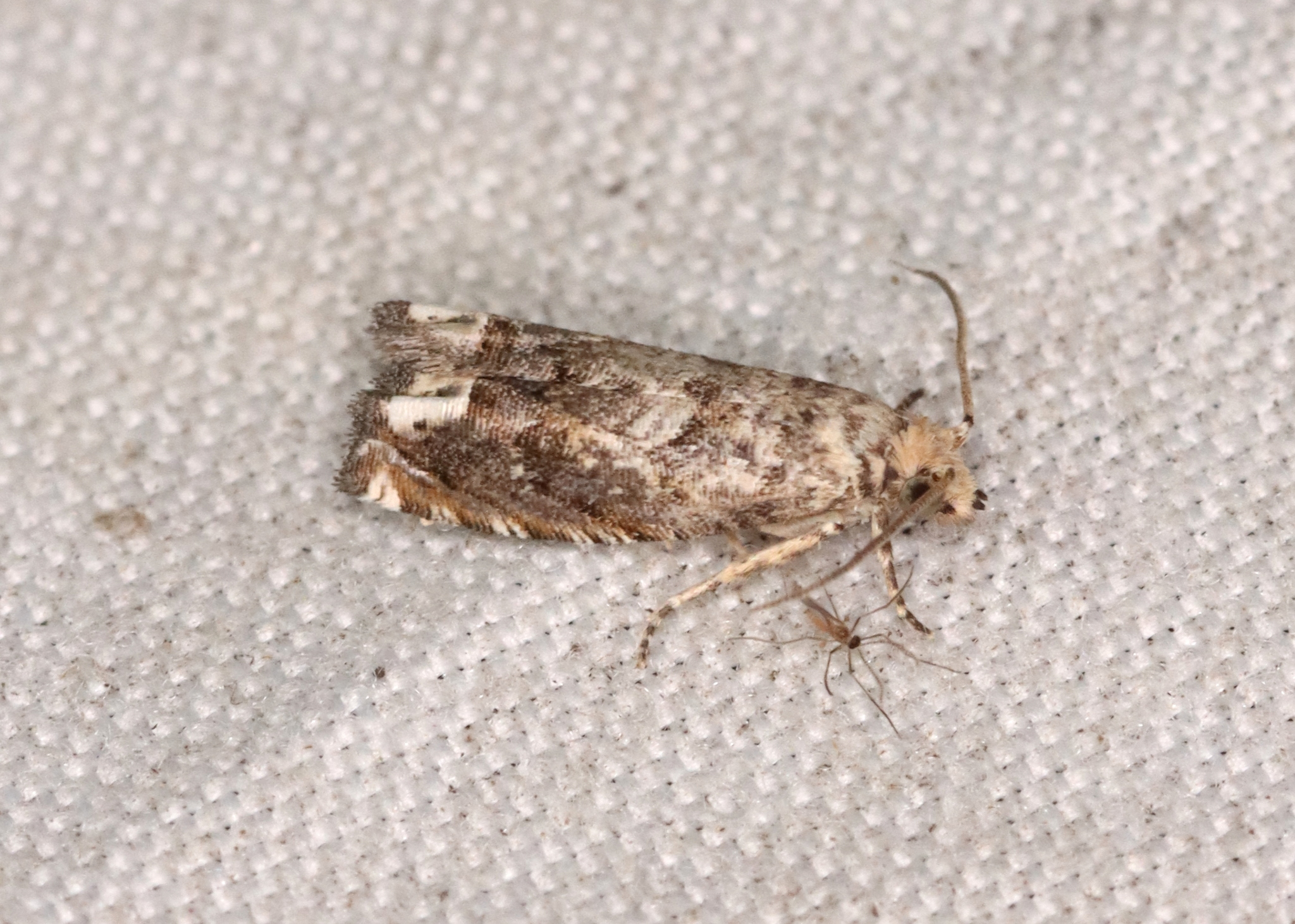
- Epiblema abruptana, Massachusetts

Scientific classification
- Domain: Eukaryota
- Kingdom: Animalia
- Phylum: Arthropoda
- Class: Insecta
- Order: Lepidoptera
- Family: Tortricidae
- Genus: Epiblema
- Species: E. abruptana

Binomial name
- Epiblema abruptana (Walsingham, 1879)

= Epiblema abruptana =

Species of moth

Epiblema abruptana is a moth belonging to the family Tortricidae. The species was first described by Lord Walsingham in 1879.

It is native to eastern United States and possibly Canada.
