= Epiblema albohamulana =

Scientific classification
- Kingdom: Animalia
- Phylum: Arthropoda
- Class: Insecta
- Order: Lepidoptera
- Family: Tortricidae
- Genus: Epiblema
- Species: E. albohamulana

Binomial name
- Epiblema albohamulana (Rebel, 1893)

Species of moth

Epiblema albohamulana is a moth belonging to the family Tortricidae. The species was first described by Hans Rebel in 1893.

It is native to Europe.
