= Epiblema batangensis =

Scientific classification
- Domain: Eukaryota
- Kingdom: Animalia
- Phylum: Arthropoda
- Class: Insecta
- Order: Lepidoptera
- Family: Tortricidae
- Genus: Epiblema
- Species: E. batangensis

Binomial name
- Epiblema batangensis (Caradja, 1939)

Synonyms
- Argyroploce batangensis Caradja, 1939

Species of moth

Epiblema batangensis is a species of moth of the family Tortricidae. It is found in China (Henan, Sichuan, Yunnan).
