= Lopidea instabilis =

Scientific classification
- Kingdom: Animalia
- Phylum: Arthropoda
- Class: Insecta
- Order: Hemiptera
- Suborder: Heteroptera
- Family: Miridae
- Tribe: Orthotylini
- Genus: Lopidea
- Species: L. instabilis

Binomial name
- Lopidea instabilis (Reuter, 1909)

Synonyms
- Lopidea rubella Knight, 1965

Species of true bug

Lopidea instabilis is a species of plant bug in the family Miridae. It is found in North America.
