= Epiblema arizonana =

Scientific classification
- Kingdom: Animalia
- Phylum: Arthropoda
- Clade: Pancrustacea
- Class: Insecta
- Order: Lepidoptera
- Family: Tortricidae
- Genus: Epiblema
- Species: E. arizonana

Binomial name
- Epiblema arizonana (Powell, 1975)

Species of moth

Epiblema arizonana is a moth belonging to the family Tortricidae. The species was first described by Powell in 1975.

It is native to Arizona.
