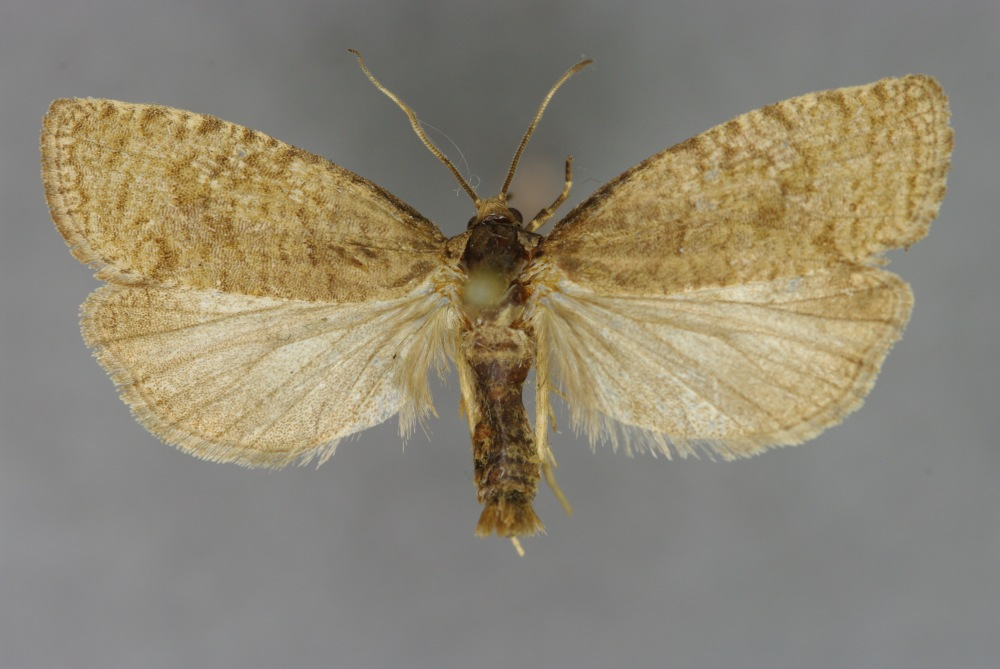

Scientific classification
- Kingdom: Animalia
- Phylum: Arthropoda
- Clade: Pancrustacea
- Class: Insecta
- Order: Lepidoptera
- Family: Tortricidae
- Genus: Epiblema
- Species: E. grandaevana

Binomial name
- Epiblema grandaevana (Lienig & Zeller, 1846)

= Epiblema grandaevana =

Species of moth

Epiblema grandaevana is a moth, belonging to the family Tortricidae. The species was first described by Friederike Lienig and Philipp Christoph Zeller in 1846.

It is native to Europe.
