= Epiblema sugii =

Scientific classification
- Kingdom: Animalia
- Phylum: Arthropoda
- Class: Insecta
- Order: Lepidoptera
- Family: Tortricidae
- Genus: Epiblema
- Species: E. sugii

Binomial name
- Epiblema sugii Kawabe, 1976

Species of moth

Epiblema sugii is a species of moth of the family Tortricidae. It is found in China (Xinjiang) and Japan.
