= Epiblema lochmoda =

Scientific classification
- Kingdom: Animalia
- Phylum: Arthropoda
- Clade: Pancrustacea
- Class: Insecta
- Order: Lepidoptera
- Family: Tortricidae
- Genus: Epiblema
- Species: E. lochmoda

Binomial name
- Epiblema lochmoda Razowski, 2006

Species of moth

Epiblema lochmoda is a species of moth of the family Tortricidae. It is found in India (Jammu and Kashmir).

The wingspan is about 18 millimetres (0.71 in).
