= Lopidea nigridia =

Scientific classification
- Kingdom: Animalia
- Phylum: Arthropoda
- Class: Insecta
- Order: Hemiptera
- Suborder: Heteroptera
- Family: Miridae
- Tribe: Orthotylini
- Genus: Lopidea
- Species: L. nigridia

Binomial name
- Lopidea nigridia Uhler, 1895

Species of true bug

Lopidea nigridia is a species of plant bug in the family Miridae. It is found in North America.

== Subspecies ==
These three subspecies belong to the species Lopidea nigridia:

- Lopidea nigridia aculeata Van Duzee, 1917
- Lopidea nigridia nigridia Uhler, 1895
- Lopidea nigridia serica Knight, 1923
