= Lopidea major =

Scientific classification
- Kingdom: Animalia
- Phylum: Arthropoda
- Class: Insecta
- Order: Hemiptera
- Suborder: Heteroptera
- Family: Miridae
- Tribe: Orthotylini
- Genus: Lopidea
- Species: L. major

Binomial name
- Lopidea major Knight, 1918

Synonyms
- Lopidea polingorum Knight, 1965; Lopidea texana Knight, 1918

Species of true bug

Lopidea major, the Red Mountain laurel mirid, is a species of plant bug in the family Miridae. It is found in Central America and North America. It is a frequently-encountered pest of the Texas Mountain Laurel, though they apparently do little real damage.
