= Lopidea lateralis =

Scientific classification
- Kingdom: Animalia
- Phylum: Arthropoda
- Class: Insecta
- Order: Hemiptera
- Suborder: Heteroptera
- Family: Miridae
- Tribe: Orthotylini
- Genus: Lopidea
- Species: L. lateralis

Binomial name
- Lopidea lateralis Knight, 1918

Species of true bug

Lopidea lateralis is a species of plant bug in the family Miridae. It is found in North America.
