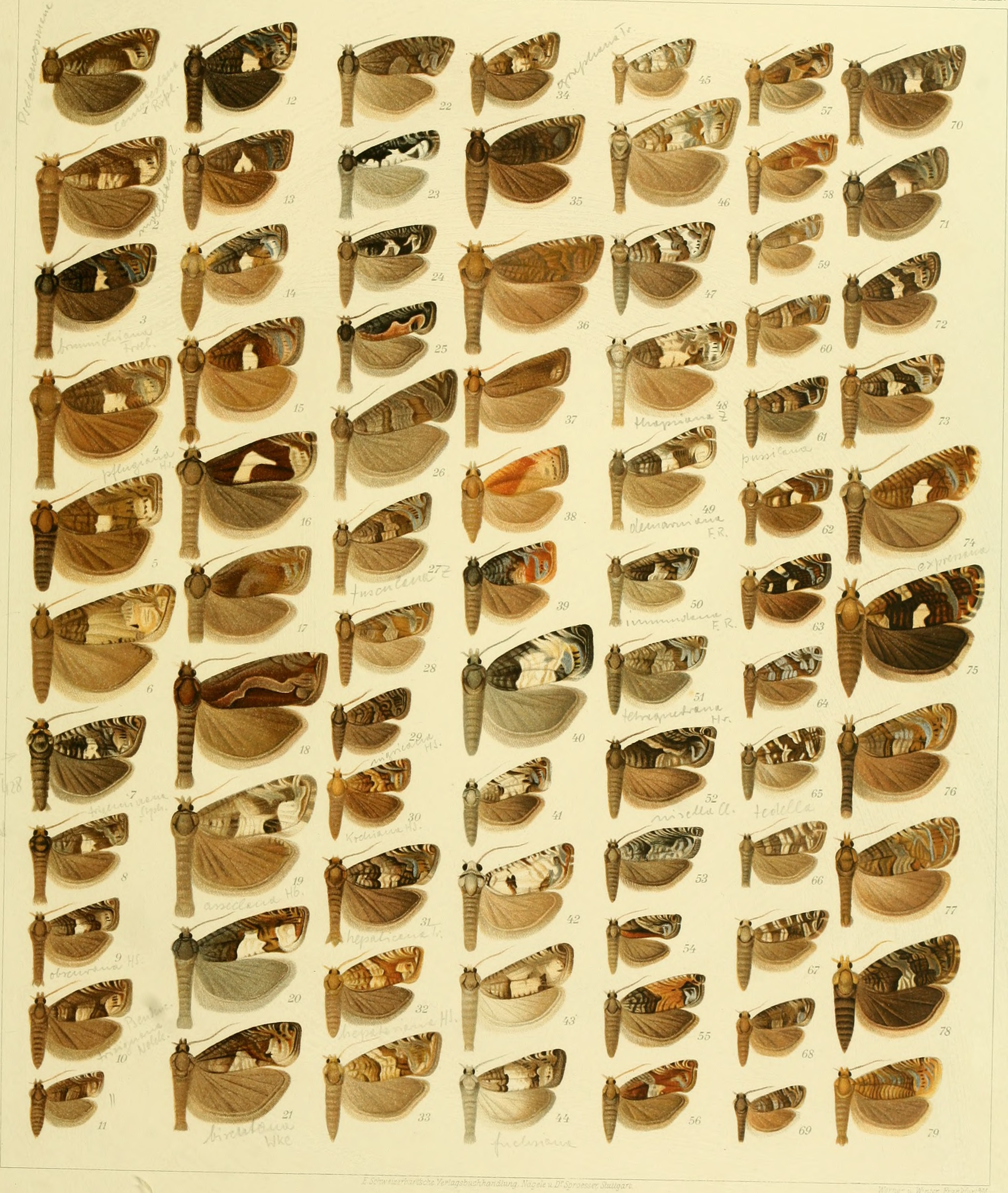

Scientific classification
- Kingdom: Animalia
- Phylum: Arthropoda
- Class: Insecta
- Order: Lepidoptera
- Family: Tortricidae
- Genus: Epiblema
- Species: E. inulivora

Binomial name
- Epiblema inulivora (Meyrick, 1932)

= Epiblema inulivora =

Species of moth

Epiblema inulivora is a moth belonging to the family Tortricidae. The species was first described by Edward Meyrick in 1932.

It is native to Europe.
