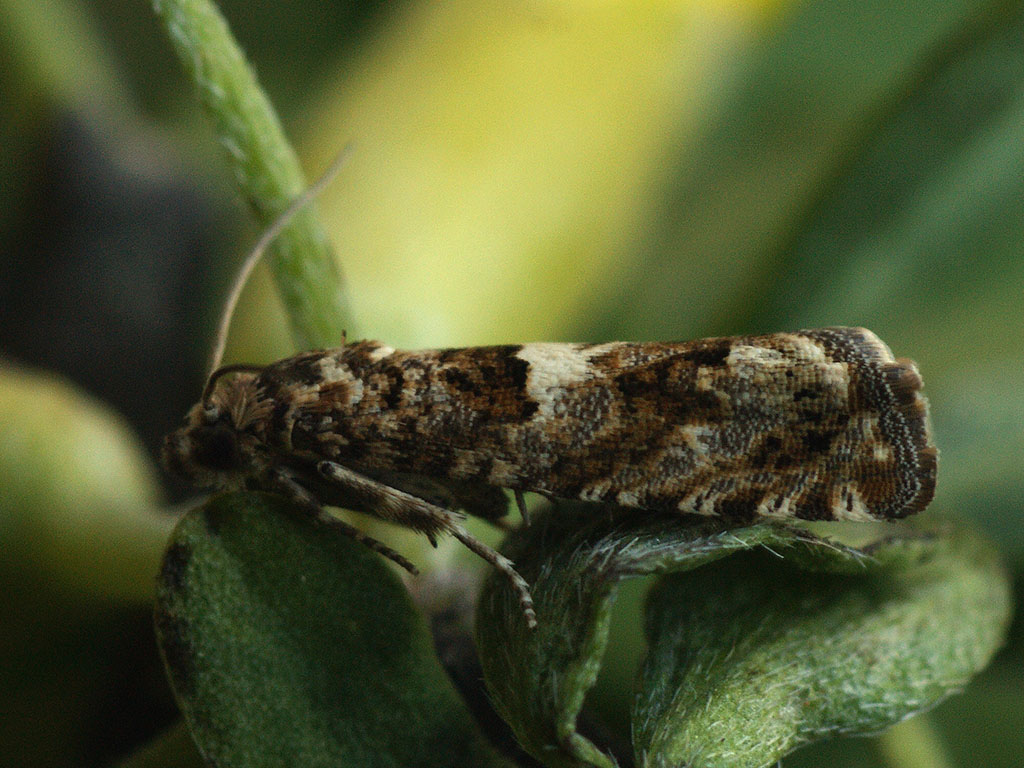

Scientific classification
- Domain: Eukaryota
- Kingdom: Animalia
- Phylum: Arthropoda
- Class: Insecta
- Order: Lepidoptera
- Family: Tortricidae
- Genus: Epiblema
- Species: E. sarmatana

Binomial name
- Epiblema sarmatana (Christoph, 1872)

Synonyms
- Grapholitha sarmatana Christoph, 1872; Grapholitha sarmatana fuchsiana Rossler, 1877; Epiblema fuchsiana

= Epiblema sarmatana =

Species of moth

Epiblema sarmatana is a species of moth of the family Tortricidae. It is found in France, Germany, Austria, Switzerland, Italy, the Czech Republic, Slovakia, Bulgaria, Romania, the Near East, Russia, Kazakhstan and China (Gansu).

The larvae feed on Chamaecytisus species.
