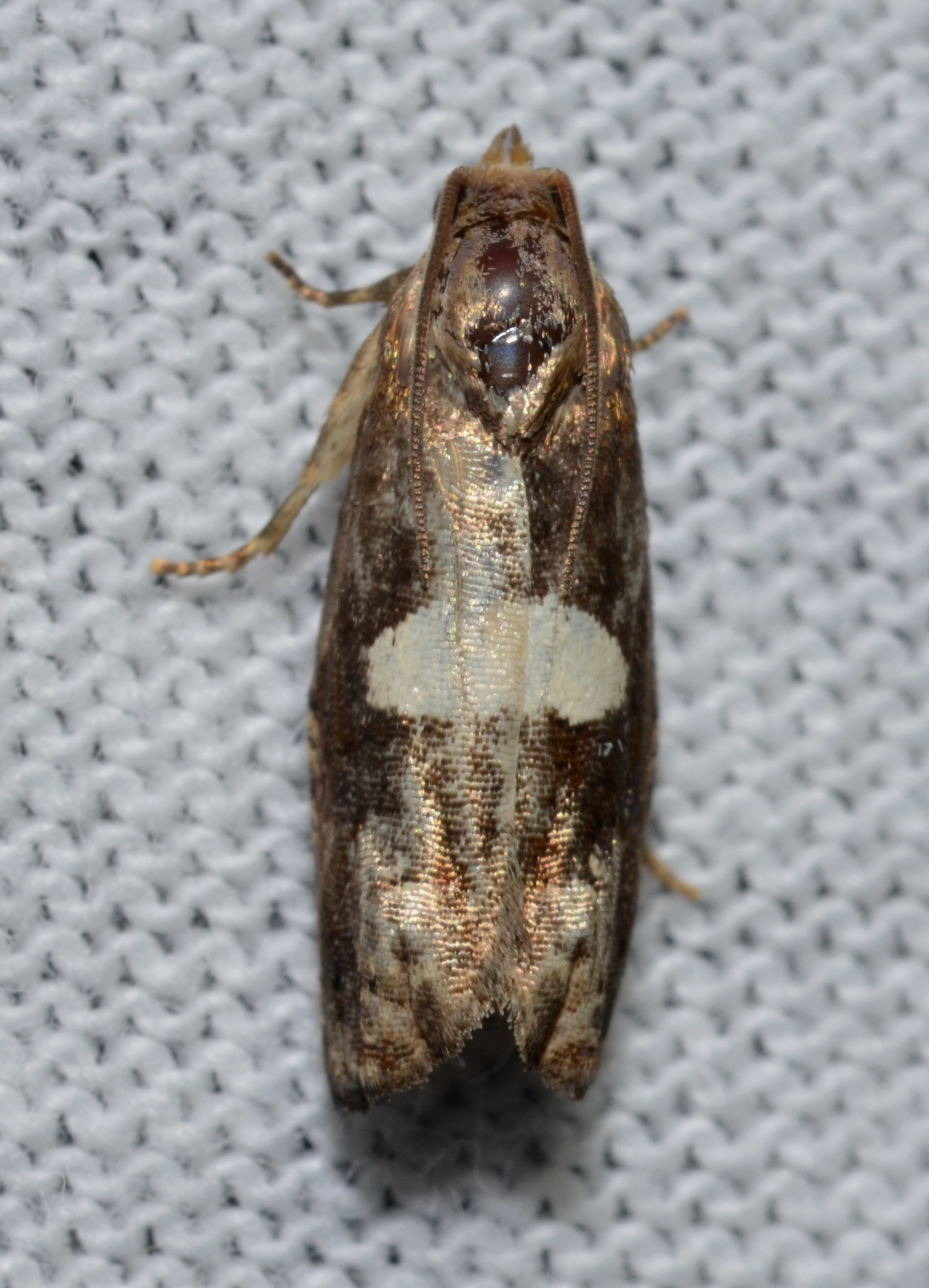

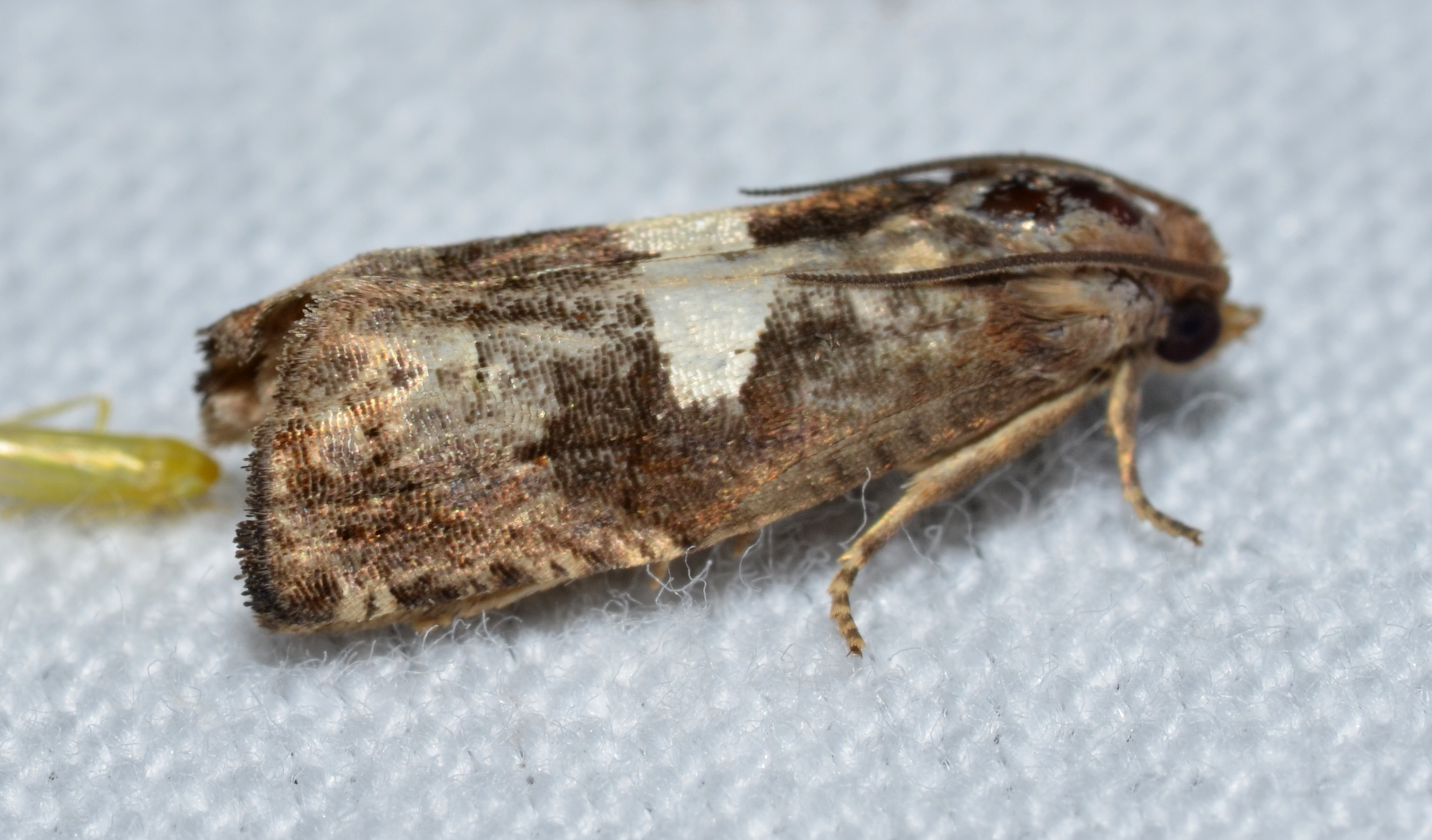

Scientific classification
- Domain: Eukaryota
- Kingdom: Animalia
- Phylum: Arthropoda
- Class: Insecta
- Order: Lepidoptera
- Family: Tortricidae
- Genus: Epiblema
- Species: E. gibsoni

Binomial name
- Epiblema gibsoni Wright & Covell, 2003

= Epiblema gibsoni =

Species of moth

Epiblema gibsoni is a species of moth of the family Tortricidae. It is found in North America, where it has been recorded from Arkansas, Illinois, Indiana, Kentucky, Michigan, Mississippi, Missouri, Ohio, North Carolina and South Carolina.

The length of the forewings is 6–9 mm. The forewings have a lavender tint. Adults are on wing from early June to late August.

== Etymology ==
The species is named for Loran D. Gibson for his contributions to the knowledge of Kentucky Lepidoptera.
