= Epiblema absconditana =

Scientific classification
- Kingdom: Animalia
- Phylum: Arthropoda
- Class: Insecta
- Order: Lepidoptera
- Family: Tortricidae
- Genus: Epiblema
- Species: E. absconditana

Binomial name
- Epiblema absconditana (La Harpe, 1860)

Species of moth

Epiblema absconditana is a moth belonging to the family Tortricidae. The species was first described by Jean Jacques Charles de La Harpe in 1860.

It is native to Europe.
