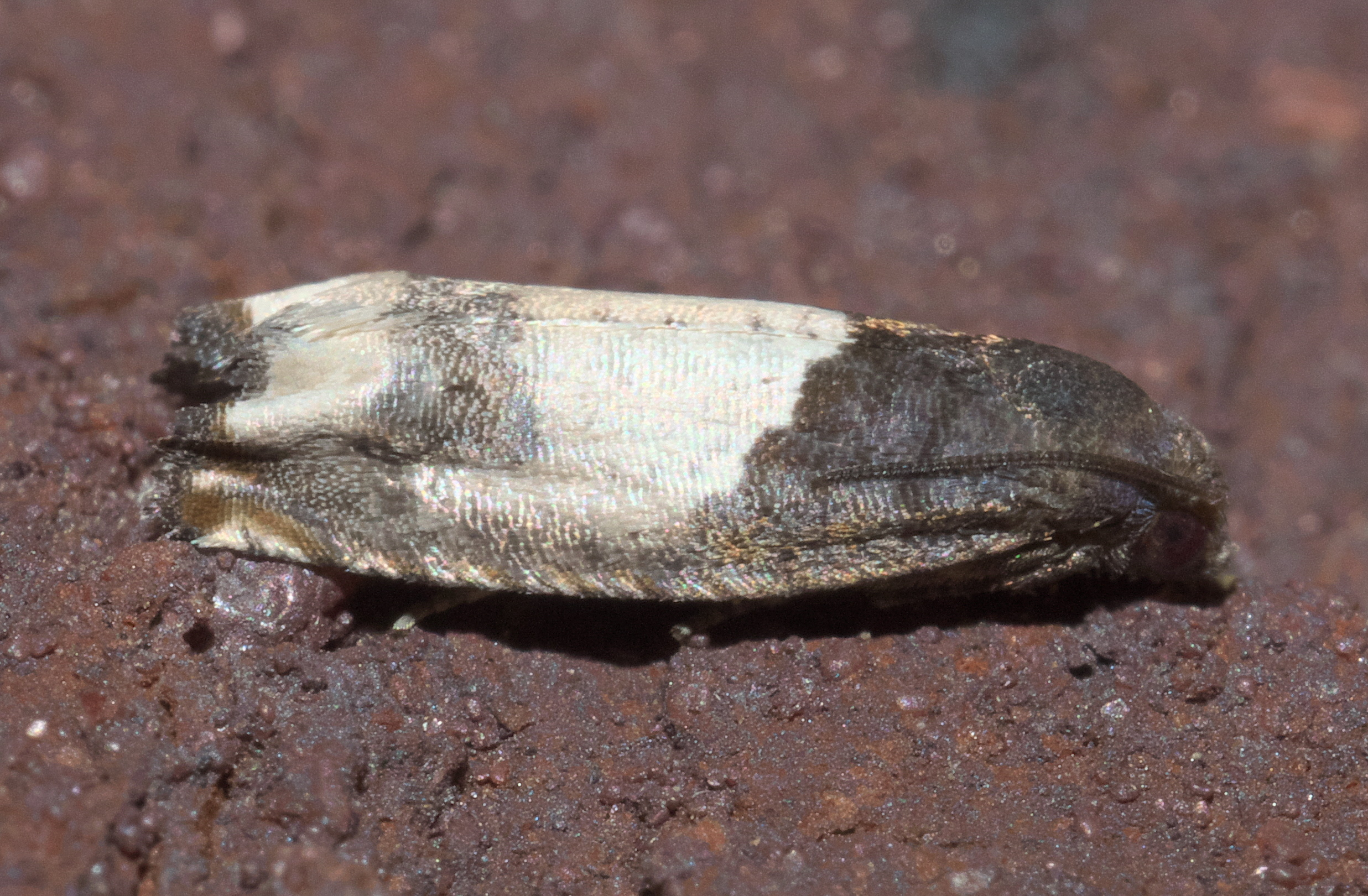

Scientific classification
- Kingdom: Animalia
- Phylum: Arthropoda
- Clade: Pancrustacea
- Class: Insecta
- Order: Lepidoptera
- Family: Tortricidae
- Genus: Epiblema
- Species: E. scudderiana

Binomial name
- Epiblema scudderiana Clemens, 1860

= Epiblema scudderiana =

Species of moth

Epiblema scudderiana, the goldenrod gall moth, is a species of tortricid moth in the family Tortricidae. As their common name suggests, they do feed on and form galls on goldenrod stems. To overwinter the caterpillars line the inside of their galls with silk before going into diapause.

The MONA or Hodges number for Epiblema scudderiana is 3186.

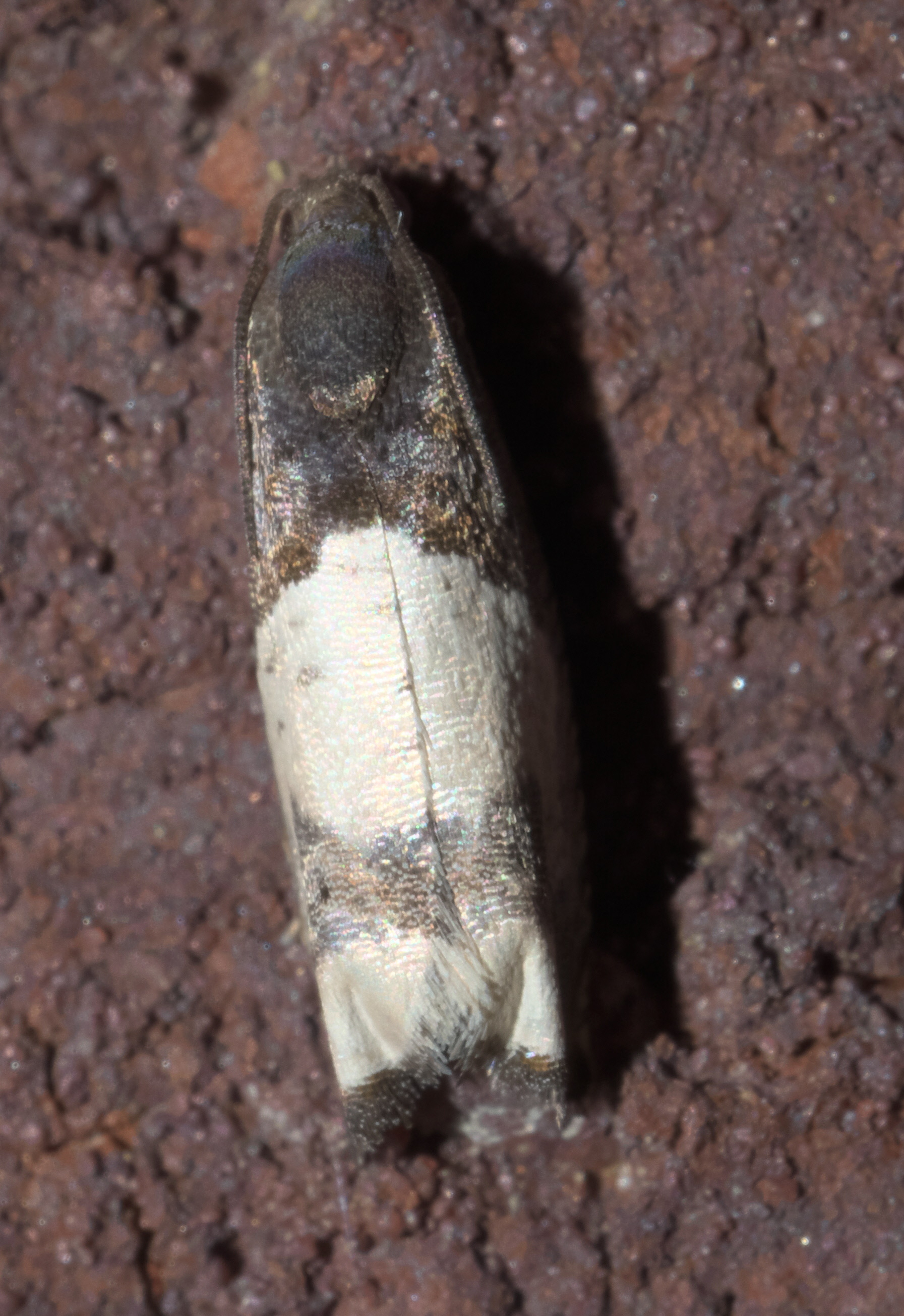
Goldenrod gall moth, Epiblema scudderiana
