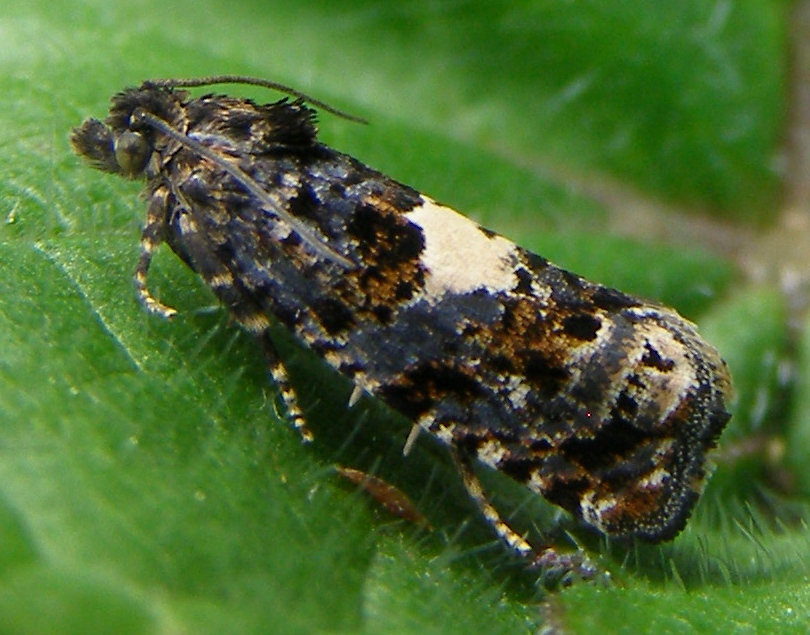

Scientific classification
- Kingdom: Animalia
- Phylum: Arthropoda
- Clade: Pancrustacea
- Class: Insecta
- Order: Lepidoptera
- Family: Tortricidae
- Genus: Epiblema
- Species: E. cirsiana

Binomial name
- Epiblema cirsiana (Zeller, 1843)

Synonyms
- Tortrix (Paedisca) cirsiana Zeller, 1843; Epiblema circiana Pierce & Metcalfe, 1922

= Epiblema cirsiana =

Species of moth

Epiblema cirsiana, the knapweed bell, is a species of moth of the family Tortricidae. It is found in Great Britain, Fennoscandia, northern Russia, Estonia, Latvia, Denmark, Germany, the Netherlands, the Czech Republic, Slovakia and Romania.

The wingspan is 12–23 mm (0.47–0.91 in). On average, it is slightly smaller than Epiblema scutulana and usually slightly darker on colour. The forewing has a bright spot at the dorsal edge, which tends to continue forward in the wing like a greyish cross band. There is also a round, light spot at the back corner and several white spots at the costal edge with a brown stripe in the middle. The hindwings are brown, paler at the base. Dissection of the genitalia is necessary to determine Endothenia species with certainty.

Adults are on wing from May to June.

The larvae feed on Cirsium palustre and Centaurea nigra. They feed in the stems and roots of their host plant.
