= Lopidea media =

Scientific classification
- Kingdom: Animalia
- Phylum: Arthropoda
- Class: Insecta
- Order: Hemiptera
- Suborder: Heteroptera
- Family: Miridae
- Genus: Lopidea
- Species: L. media

Binomial name
- Lopidea media (Say, 1832)

Synonyms
- Capsus medius Say, 1832

Species of true bug

Lopidea media is a species of plant bug in the family Miridae. It is found in North America.
