= List of Lepidoptera of Belgium =

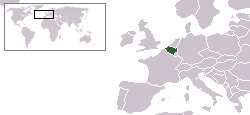
Location of Belgium

== Butterflies ==
=== Hesperiidae ===
- Carcharodus alceae (Esper, 1780)
- Carterocephalus palaemon (Pallas, 1771)
- Erynnis tages (Linnaeus, 1758)
- Hesperia comma (Linnaeus, 1758)
- Heteropterus morpheus (Pallas, 1771)
- Ochlodes sylvanus (Esper, 1777)
- Pyrgus alveus (Hübner, 1803)
- Pyrgus armoricanus (Oberthur, 1910)
- Pyrgus carthami (Hübner, 1813)
- Pyrgus malvae (Linnaeus, 1758)
- Pyrgus serratulae (Rambur, 1839)
- Spialia sertorius (Hoffmannsegg, 1804)
- Thymelicus acteon (Rottemburg, 1775)
- Thymelicus lineola (Ochsenheimer, 1808)
- Thymelicus sylvestris (Poda, 1761)

=== Lycaenidae ===
- Aricia agestis (Denis & Schiffermüller, 1775)
- Callophrys rubi (Linnaeus, 1758)
- Celastrina argiolus (Linnaeus, 1758)
- Cupido minimus (Fuessly, 1775)
- Cupido argiades (Pallas, 1771)
- Cyaniris semiargus (Rottemburg, 1775)
- Favonius quercus (Linnaeus, 1758)
- Glaucopsyche alexis (Poda, 1761)
- Lampides boeticus (Linnaeus, 1767)
- Lycaena dispar (Haworth, 1802)
- Lycaena helle (Denis & Schiffermüller, 1775)
- Lycaena hippothoe (Linnaeus, 1761)
- Lycaena phlaeas (Linnaeus, 1761)
- Lycaena tityrus (Poda, 1761)
- Lycaena virgaureae (Linnaeus, 1758)
- Lysandra bellargus (Rottemburg, 1775)
- Lysandra coridon (Poda, 1761)
- Phengaris alcon (Denis & Schiffermüller, 1775)
- Phengaris arion (Linnaeus, 1758)
- Phengaris teleius (Bergstrasser, 1779)
- Plebejus argus (Linnaeus, 1758)
- Plebejus argyrognomon (Bergstrasser, 1779)
- Plebejus idas (Linnaeus, 1761)
- Polyommatus damon (Denis & Schiffermüller, 1775)
- Polyommatus dorylas (Denis & Schiffermüller, 1775)
- Polyommatus icarus (Rottemburg, 1775)
- Polyommatus thersites (Cantener, 1835)
- Pseudophilotes baton (Bergstrasser, 1779)
- Satyrium acaciae (Fabricius, 1787)
- Satyrium ilicis (Esper, 1779)
- Satyrium pruni (Linnaeus, 1758)
- Satyrium spini (Denis & Schiffermüller, 1775)
- Satyrium w-album (Knoch, 1782)
- Thecla betulae (Linnaeus, 1758)

=== Nymphalidae ===
- Aglais io (Linnaeus, 1758)
- Aglais urticae (Linnaeus, 1758)
- Apatura ilia (Denis & Schiffermüller, 1775)
- Apatura iris (Linnaeus, 1758)
- Aphantopus hyperantus (Linnaeus, 1758)
- Araschnia levana (Linnaeus, 1758)
- Arethusana arethusa (Denis & Schiffermüller, 1775)
- Argynnis paphia (Linnaeus, 1758)
- Boloria aquilonaris (Stichel, 1908)
- Boloria dia (Linnaeus, 1767)
- Boloria euphrosyne (Linnaeus, 1758)
- Boloria selene (Denis & Schiffermüller, 1775)
- Boloria eunomia (Esper, 1799)
- Brenthis ino (Rottemburg, 1775)
- Chazara briseis (Linnaeus, 1764)
- Coenonympha arcania (Linnaeus, 1761)
- Coenonympha glycerion (Borkhausen, 1788)
- Coenonympha hero (Linnaeus, 1761)
- Coenonympha pamphilus (Linnaeus, 1758)
- Coenonympha tullia (Muller, 1764)
- Danaus plexippus (Linnaeus, 1758)
- Erebia aethiops (Esper, 1777)
- Erebia ligea (Linnaeus, 1758)
- Erebia medusa (Denis & Schiffermüller, 1775)
- Euphydryas aurinia (Rottemburg, 1775)
- Euphydryas maturna (Linnaeus, 1758)
- Fabriciana adippe (Denis & Schiffermüller, 1775)
- Fabriciana niobe (Linnaeus, 1758)
- Hipparchia fagi (Scopoli, 1763)
- Hipparchia statilinus (Hufnagel, 1766)
- Hipparchia semele (Linnaeus, 1758)
- Issoria lathonia (Linnaeus, 1758)
- Lasiommata maera (Linnaeus, 1758)
- Lasiommata megera (Linnaeus, 1767)
- Limenitis camilla (Linnaeus, 1764)
- Limenitis populi (Linnaeus, 1758)
- Lopinga achine (Scopoli, 1763)
- Maniola jurtina (Linnaeus, 1758)
- Melanargia galathea (Linnaeus, 1758)
- Melitaea athalia (Rottemburg, 1775)
- Melitaea aurelia Nickerl, 1850
- Melitaea cinxia (Linnaeus, 1758)
- Melitaea diamina (Lang, 1789)
- Melitaea didyma (Esper, 1778)
- Melitaea phoebe (Denis & Schiffermüller, 1775)
- Nymphalis antiopa (Linnaeus, 1758)
- Nymphalis polychloros (Linnaeus, 1758)
- Pararge aegeria (Linnaeus, 1758)
- Polygonia c-album (Linnaeus, 1758)
- Pyronia tithonus (Linnaeus, 1767)
- Speyeria aglaja (Linnaeus, 1758)
- Vanessa atalanta (Linnaeus, 1758)
- Vanessa cardui (Linnaeus, 1758)

=== Papilionidae ===
- Iphiclides podalirius (Linnaeus, 1758)
- Papilio machaon Linnaeus, 1758

=== Pieridae ===
- Anthocharis cardamines (Linnaeus, 1758)
- Aporia crataegi (Linnaeus, 1758)
- Colias alfacariensis Ribbe, 1905
- Colias croceus (Fourcroy, 1785)
- Colias hyale (Linnaeus, 1758)
- Colias palaeno (Linnaeus, 1761)
- Euchloe crameri Butler, 1869
- Gonepteryx rhamni (Linnaeus, 1758)
- Leptidea sinapis (Linnaeus, 1758)
- Pieris brassicae (Linnaeus, 1758)
- Pieris napi (Linnaeus, 1758)
- Pieris rapae (Linnaeus, 1758)

=== Riodinidae ===
- Hamearis lucina (Linnaeus, 1758)

== Moths ==
=== Adelidae ===
- Adela croesella (Scopoli, 1763)
- Adela cuprella (Denis & Schiffermüller, 1775)
- Adela reaumurella (Linnaeus, 1758)
- Adela violella (Denis & Schiffermüller, 1775)
- Cauchas fibulella (Denis & Schiffermüller, 1775)
- Cauchas rufimitrella (Scopoli, 1763)
- Nematopogon adansoniella (Villers, 1789)
- Nematopogon metaxella (Hübner, 1813)
- Nematopogon pilella (Denis & Schiffermüller, 1775)
- Nematopogon robertella (Clerck, 1759)
- Nematopogon schwarziellus Zeller, 1839
- Nematopogon swammerdamella (Linnaeus, 1758)
- Nemophora congruella (Zeller, 1839)
- Nemophora cupriacella (Hübner, 1819)
- Nemophora degeerella (Linnaeus, 1758)
- Nemophora dumerilella (Duponchel, 1839)
- Nemophora fasciella (Fabricius, 1775)
- Nemophora metallica (Poda, 1761)
- Nemophora minimella (Denis & Schiffermüller, 1775)
- Nemophora ochsenheimerella (Hübner, 1813)

=== Alucitidae ===
- Alucita grammodactyla Zeller, 1841
- Alucita hexadactyla Linnaeus, 1758

=== Argyresthiidae ===
- Argyresthia abdominalis Zeller, 1839
- Argyresthia albistria (Haworth, 1828)
- Argyresthia aurulentella Stainton, 1849
- Argyresthia bonnetella (Linnaeus, 1758)
- Argyresthia brockeella (Hübner, 1813)
- Argyresthia conjugella Zeller, 1839
- Argyresthia curvella (Linnaeus, 1761)
- Argyresthia fundella (Fischer von Röslerstamm, 1835)
- Argyresthia glaucinella Zeller, 1839
- Argyresthia goedartella (Linnaeus, 1758)
- Argyresthia ivella (Haworth, 1828)
- Argyresthia pruniella (Clerck, 1759)
- Argyresthia pygmaeella (Denis & Schiffermüller, 1775)
- Argyresthia retinella Zeller, 1839
- Argyresthia semifusca (Haworth, 1828)
- Argyresthia semitestacella (Curtis, 1833)
- Argyresthia sorbiella (Treitschke, 1833)
- Argyresthia spinosella Stainton, 1849
- Argyresthia arceuthina Zeller, 1839
- Argyresthia dilectella Zeller, 1847
- Argyresthia glabratella (Zeller, 1847)
- Argyresthia illuminatella Zeller, 1839
- Argyresthia praecocella Zeller, 1839
- Argyresthia thuiella (Packard, 1871)
- Argyresthia trifasciata Staudinger, 1871

=== Autostichidae ===
- Oegoconia caradjai Popescu-Gorj & Capuse, 1965
- Oegoconia deauratella (Herrich-Schäffer, 1854)
- Oegoconia quadripuncta (Haworth, 1828)

=== Batrachedridae ===
- Batrachedra pinicolella (Zeller, 1839)
- Batrachedra praeangusta (Haworth, 1828)

=== Bedelliidae ===
- Bedellia somnulentella (Zeller, 1847)

=== Blastobasidae ===
- Blastobasis phycidella (Zeller, 1839)
- Hypatopa binotella (Thunberg, 1794)
- Hypatopa inunctella Zeller, 1839

=== Brahmaeidae ===
- Lemonia dumi (Linnaeus, 1761)

=== Bucculatricidae ===
- Bucculatrix albedinella (Zeller, 1839)
- Bucculatrix artemisiella Herrich-Schäffer, 1855
- Bucculatrix bechsteinella (Bechstein & Scharfenberg, 1805)
- Bucculatrix cidarella (Zeller, 1839)
- Bucculatrix cristatella (Zeller, 1839)
- Bucculatrix demaryella (Duponchel, 1840)
- Bucculatrix frangutella (Goeze, 1783)
- Bucculatrix gnaphaliella (Treitschke, 1833)
- Bucculatrix maritima Stainton, 1851
- Bucculatrix nigricomella (Zeller, 1839)
- Bucculatrix noltei Petry, 1912
- Bucculatrix thoracella (Thunberg, 1794)
- Bucculatrix ulmella Zeller, 1848

=== Chimabachidae ===
- Dasystoma salicella (Hübner, 1796)
- Diurnea fagella (Denis & Schiffermüller, 1775)
- Diurnea lipsiella (Denis & Schiffermüller, 1775)

=== Choreutidae ===
- Anthophila fabriciana (Linnaeus, 1767)
- Choreutis pariana (Clerck, 1759)
- Prochoreutis myllerana (Fabricius, 1794)
- Prochoreutis sehestediana (Fabricius, 1776)

=== Coleophoridae ===
- Augasma aeratella (Zeller, 1839)
- Coleophora adjunctella Hodgkinson, 1882
- Coleophora adspersella Benander, 1939
- Coleophora ahenella Heinemann, 1877
- Coleophora albella (Thunberg, 1788)
- Coleophora albicans Zeller, 1849
- Coleophora albicosta (Haworth, 1828)
- Coleophora albicostella (Duponchel, 1842)
- Coleophora albidella (Denis & Schiffermüller, 1775)
- Coleophora albitarsella Zeller, 1849
- Coleophora alnifoliae Barasch, 1934
- Coleophora alticolella Zeller, 1849
- Coleophora anatipenella (Hübner, 1796)
- Coleophora antennariella Herrich-Schäffer, 1861
- Coleophora argentula (Stephens, 1834)
- Coleophora artemisicolella Bruand, 1855
- Coleophora asteris Muhlig, 1864
- Coleophora atriplicis Meyrick, 1928
- Coleophora badiipennella (Duponchel, 1843)
- Coleophora betulella Heinemann, 1877
- Coleophora binderella (Kollar, 1832)
- Coleophora caespititiella Zeller, 1839
- Coleophora calycotomella Stainton, 1869
- Coleophora chamaedriella Bruand, 1852
- Coleophora clypeiferella Hofmann, 1871
- Coleophora conspicuella Zeller, 1849
- Coleophora coracipennella (Hübner, 1796)
- Coleophora cornutella Herrich-Schäffer, 1861
- Coleophora currucipennella Zeller, 1839
- Coleophora deauratella Lienig & Zeller, 1846
- Coleophora deviella Zeller, 1847
- Coleophora discordella Zeller, 1849
- Coleophora flavipennella (Duponchel, 1843)
- Coleophora follicularis (Vallot, 1802)
- Coleophora frischella (Linnaeus, 1758)
- Coleophora fuscocuprella Herrich-Schäffer, 1855
- Coleophora galbulipennella Zeller, 1838
- Coleophora gallipennella (Hübner, 1796)
- Coleophora gardesanella Toll, 1954
- Coleophora genistae Stainton, 1857
- Coleophora glaucicolella Wood, 1892
- Coleophora granulatella Zeller, 1849
- Coleophora gryphipennella (Hübner, 1796)
- Coleophora hemerobiella (Scopoli, 1763)
- Coleophora hydrolapathella Hering, 1921
- Coleophora ibipennella Zeller, 1849
- Coleophora inulae Wocke, 1877
- Coleophora juncicolella Stainton, 1851
- Coleophora kuehnella (Goeze, 1783)
- Coleophora laricella (Hübner, 1817)
- Coleophora lassella Staudinger, 1859
- Coleophora limosipennella (Duponchel, 1843)
- Coleophora lineolea (Haworth, 1828)
- Coleophora lithargyrinella Zeller, 1849
- Coleophora lixella Zeller, 1849
- Coleophora lusciniaepennella (Treitschke, 1833)
- Coleophora lutipennella (Zeller, 1838)
- Coleophora mayrella (Hübner, 1813)
- Coleophora milvipennis Zeller, 1839
- Coleophora niveicostella Zeller, 1839
- Coleophora obscenella Herrich-Schäffer, 1855
- Coleophora ochrea (Haworth, 1828)
- Coleophora ochripennella Zeller, 1849
- Coleophora orbitella Zeller, 1849
- Coleophora ornatipennella (Hübner, 1796)
- Coleophora otidipennella (Hübner, 1817)
- Coleophora paripennella Zeller, 1839
- Coleophora pennella (Denis & Schiffermüller, 1775)
- Coleophora peribenanderi Toll, 1943
- Coleophora potentillae Elisha, 1885
- Coleophora pratella Zeller, 1871
- Coleophora prunifoliae Doets, 1944
- Coleophora pyrrhulipennella Zeller, 1839
- Coleophora salicorniae Heinemann & Wocke, 1877
- Coleophora saturatella Stainton, 1850
- Coleophora saxicolella (Duponchel, 1843)
- Coleophora serratella (Linnaeus, 1761)
- Coleophora siccifolia Stainton, 1856
- Coleophora silenella Herrich-Schäffer, 1855
- Coleophora solitariella Zeller, 1849
- Coleophora spinella (Schrank, 1802)
- Coleophora sternipennella (Zetterstedt, 1839)
- Coleophora striatipennella Nylander in Tengstrom, 1848
- Coleophora succursella Herrich-Schäffer, 1855
- Coleophora supinella Ortner, 1949
- Coleophora sylvaticella Wood, 1892
- Coleophora taeniipennella Herrich-Schäffer, 1855
- Coleophora tamesis Waters, 1929
- Coleophora tanaceti Muhlig, 1865
- Coleophora therinella Tengstrom, 1848
- Coleophora trifariella Zeller, 1849
- Coleophora trifolii (Curtis, 1832)
- Coleophora trochilella (Duponchel, 1843)
- Coleophora versurella Zeller, 1849
- Coleophora vestianella (Linnaeus, 1758)
- Coleophora vibicella (Hübner, 1813)
- Coleophora violacea (Strom, 1783)
- Coleophora vitisella Gregson, 1856
- Coleophora vulnerariae Zeller, 1839
- Coleophora zelleriella Heinemann, 1854
- Goniodoma limoniella (Stainton, 1884)
- Metriotes lutarea (Haworth, 1828)

=== Cosmopterigidae ===
- Cosmopterix lienigiella Zeller, 1846
- Cosmopterix scribaiella Zeller, 1850
- Cosmopterix zieglerella (Hübner, 1810)
- Limnaecia phragmitella Stainton, 1851
- Pancalia leuwenhoekella (Linnaeus, 1761)
- Pancalia schwarzella (Fabricius, 1798)
- Sorhagenia rhamniella (Zeller, 1839)

=== Cossidae ===
- Cossus cossus (Linnaeus, 1758)
- Phragmataecia castaneae (Hübner, 1790)
- Zeuzera pyrina (Linnaeus, 1761)

=== Crambidae ===
- Acentria ephemerella (Denis & Schiffermüller, 1775)
- Agriphila deliella (Hübner, 1813)
- Agriphila geniculea (Haworth, 1811)
- Agriphila inquinatella (Denis & Schiffermüller, 1775)
- Agriphila latistria (Haworth, 1811)
- Agriphila selasella (Hübner, 1813)
- Agriphila straminella (Denis & Schiffermüller, 1775)
- Agriphila tristella (Denis & Schiffermüller, 1775)
- Agrotera nemoralis (Scopoli, 1763)
- Anania coronata (Hufnagel, 1767)
- Anania crocealis (Hübner, 1796)
- Anania funebris (Strom, 1768)
- Anania fuscalis (Denis & Schiffermüller, 1775)
- Anania hortulata (Linnaeus, 1758)
- Anania lancealis (Denis & Schiffermüller, 1775)
- Anania perlucidalis (Hübner, 1809)
- Anania stachydalis (Germar, 1821)
- Anania terrealis (Treitschke, 1829)
- Anania verbascalis (Denis & Schiffermüller, 1775)
- Ancylolomia palpella (Denis & Schiffermüller, 1775)
- Atralata albofascialis (Treitschke, 1829)
- Calamotropha paludella (Hübner, 1824)
- Cataclysta lemnata (Linnaeus, 1758)
- Catoptria falsella (Denis & Schiffermüller, 1775)
- Catoptria fulgidella (Hübner, 1813)
- Catoptria lythargyrella (Hübner, 1796)
- Catoptria margaritella (Denis & Schiffermüller, 1775)
- Catoptria mytilella (Hübner, 1805)
- Catoptria osthelderi (Lattin, 1950)
- Catoptria permutatellus (Herrich-Schäffer, 1848)
- Catoptria pinella (Linnaeus, 1758)
- Catoptria verellus (Zincken, 1817)
- Chilo phragmitella (Hübner, 1805)
- Chrysocrambus craterella (Scopoli, 1763)
- Chrysoteuchia culmella (Linnaeus, 1758)
- Crambus ericella (Hübner, 1813)
- Crambus hamella (Thunberg, 1788)
- Crambus lathoniellus (Zincken, 1817)
- Crambus pascuella (Linnaeus, 1758)
- Crambus perlella (Scopoli, 1763)
- Crambus pratella (Linnaeus, 1758)
- Crambus silvella (Hübner, 1813)
- Crambus uliginosellus Zeller, 1850
- Cynaeda dentalis (Denis & Schiffermüller, 1775)
- Diasemia reticularis (Linnaeus, 1761)
- Diasemiopsis ramburialis (Duponchel, 1834)
- Diplopseustis perieresalis (Walker, 1859)
- Donacaula forficella (Thunberg, 1794)
- Donacaula mucronella (Denis & Schiffermüller, 1775)
- Duponchelia fovealis Zeller, 1847
- Elophila nymphaeata (Linnaeus, 1758)
- Elophila rivulalis (Duponchel, 1834)
- Euchromius ocellea (Haworth, 1811)
- Eudonia delunella (Stainton, 1849)
- Eudonia lacustrata (Panzer, 1804)
- Eudonia laetella (Zeller, 1846)
- Eudonia mercurella (Linnaeus, 1758)
- Eudonia pallida (Curtis, 1827)
- Eudonia truncicolella (Stainton, 1849)
- Eurrhypis pollinalis (Denis & Schiffermüller, 1775)
- Evergestis extimalis (Scopoli, 1763)
- Evergestis forficalis (Linnaeus, 1758)
- Evergestis limbata (Linnaeus, 1767)
- Evergestis pallidata (Hufnagel, 1767)
- Evergestis politalis (Denis & Schiffermüller, 1775)
- Friedlanderia cicatricella (Hübner, 1824)
- Heliothela wulfeniana (Scopoli, 1763)
- Loxostege sticticalis (Linnaeus, 1761)
- Mecyna flavalis (Denis & Schiffermüller, 1775)
- Nascia cilialis (Hübner, 1796)
- Nomophila noctuella (Denis & Schiffermüller, 1775)
- Nymphula nitidulata (Hufnagel, 1767)
- Ostrinia nubilalis (Hübner, 1796)
- Palpita vitrealis (Rossi, 1794)
- Paracorsia repandalis (Denis & Schiffermüller, 1775)
- Parapoynx stratiotata (Linnaeus, 1758)
- Paratalanta hyalinalis (Hübner, 1796)
- Paratalanta pandalis (Hübner, 1825)
- Pediasia aridella (Thunberg, 1788)
- Pediasia contaminella (Hübner, 1796)
- Pediasia fascelinella (Hübner, 1813)
- Pediasia luteella (Denis & Schiffermüller, 1775)
- Platytes alpinella (Hübner, 1813)
- Platytes cerussella (Denis & Schiffermüller, 1775)
- Pleuroptya ruralis (Scopoli, 1763)
- Pyrausta aurata (Scopoli, 1763)
- Pyrausta cingulata (Linnaeus, 1758)
- Pyrausta despicata (Scopoli, 1763)
- Pyrausta nigrata (Scopoli, 1763)
- Pyrausta obfuscata (Scopoli, 1763)
- Pyrausta ostrinalis (Hübner, 1796)
- Pyrausta porphyralis (Denis & Schiffermüller, 1775)
- Pyrausta purpuralis (Linnaeus, 1758)
- Pyrausta sanguinalis (Linnaeus, 1767)
- Schoenobius gigantella (Denis & Schiffermüller, 1775)
- Scoparia ambigualis (Treitschke, 1829)
- Scoparia basistrigalis Knaggs, 1866
- Scoparia conicella (La Harpe, 1863)
- Scoparia pyralella (Denis & Schiffermüller, 1775)
- Scoparia subfusca Haworth, 1811
- Sitochroa palealis (Denis & Schiffermüller, 1775)
- Sitochroa verticalis (Linnaeus, 1758)
- Thisanotia chrysonuchella (Scopoli, 1763)
- Udea ferrugalis (Hübner, 1796)
- Udea fulvalis (Hübner, 1809)
- Udea hamalis (Thunberg, 1788)
- Udea lutealis (Hübner, 1809)
- Udea olivalis (Denis & Schiffermüller, 1775)
- Udea prunalis (Denis & Schiffermüller, 1775)
- Uresiphita gilvata (Fabricius, 1794)
- Xanthocrambus saxonellus (Zincken, 1821)

=== Douglasiidae ===
- Klimeschia transversella (Zeller, 1839)
- Tinagma balteolella (Fischer von Röslerstamm, 1841)
- Tinagma ocnerostomella (Stainton, 1850)
- Tinagma perdicella Zeller, 1839

=== Drepanidae ===
- Achlya flavicornis (Linnaeus, 1758)
- Cilix glaucata (Scopoli, 1763)
- Cymatophorina diluta (Denis & Schiffermüller, 1775)
- Drepana curvatula (Borkhausen, 1790)
- Drepana falcataria (Linnaeus, 1758)
- Falcaria lacertinaria (Linnaeus, 1758)
- Habrosyne pyritoides (Hufnagel, 1766)
- Ochropacha duplaris (Linnaeus, 1761)
- Polyploca ridens (Fabricius, 1787)
- Sabra harpagula (Esper, 1786)
- Tethea ocularis (Linnaeus, 1767)
- Tethea or (Denis & Schiffermüller, 1775)
- Tetheella fluctuosa (Hübner, 1803)
- Thyatira batis (Linnaeus, 1758)
- Watsonalla binaria (Hufnagel, 1767)
- Watsonalla cultraria (Fabricius, 1775)

=== Elachistidae ===
- Agonopterix alstromeriana (Clerck, 1759)
- Agonopterix angelicella (Hübner, 1813)
- Agonopterix arenella (Denis & Schiffermüller, 1775)
- Agonopterix assimilella (Treitschke, 1832)
- Agonopterix atomella (Denis & Schiffermüller, 1775)
- Agonopterix capreolella (Zeller, 1839)
- Agonopterix ciliella (Stainton, 1849)
- Agonopterix cnicella (Treitschke, 1832)
- Agonopterix conterminella (Zeller, 1839)
- Agonopterix curvipunctosa (Haworth, 1811)
- Agonopterix heracliana (Linnaeus, 1758)
- Agonopterix kaekeritziana (Linnaeus, 1767)
- Agonopterix laterella (Denis & Schiffermüller, 1775)
- Agonopterix liturosa (Haworth, 1811)
- Agonopterix nanatella (Stainton, 1849)
- Agonopterix nervosa (Haworth, 1811)
- Agonopterix ocellana (Fabricius, 1775)
- Agonopterix pallorella (Zeller, 1839)
- Agonopterix propinquella (Treitschke, 1835)
- Agonopterix purpurea (Haworth, 1811)
- Agonopterix rotundella (Douglas, 1846)
- Agonopterix scopariella (Heinemann, 1870)
- Agonopterix subpropinquella (Stainton, 1849)
- Agonopterix yeatiana (Fabricius, 1781)
- Anchinia cristalis (Scopoli, 1763)
- Blastodacna atra (Haworth, 1828)
- Blastodacna hellerella (Duponchel, 1838)
- Chrysoclista lathamella (T. B. Fletcher, 1936)
- Chrysoclista linneella (Clerck, 1759)
- Depressaria albipunctella (Denis & Schiffermüller, 1775)
- Depressaria badiella (Hübner, 1796)
- Depressaria chaerophylli Zeller, 1839
- Depressaria daucella (Denis & Schiffermüller, 1775)
- Depressaria depressana (Fabricius, 1775)
- Depressaria discipunctella Herrich-Schäffer, 1854
- Depressaria douglasella Stainton, 1849
- Depressaria emeritella Stainton, 1849
- Depressaria olerella Zeller, 1854
- Depressaria pimpinellae Zeller, 1839
- Depressaria pulcherrimella Stainton, 1849
- Depressaria radiella (Goeze, 1783)
- Depressaria ultimella Stainton, 1849
- Elachista adscitella Stainton, 1851
- Elachista argentella (Clerck, 1759)
- Elachista bedellella (Sircom, 1848)
- Elachista bisulcella (Duponchel, 1843)
- Elachista cahorsensis Traugott-Olsen, 1992
- Elachista chrysodesmella Zeller, 1850
- Elachista gangabella Zeller, 1850
- Elachista nitidulella (Herrich-Schäffer, 1885)
- Elachista obliquella Stainton, 1854
- Elachista pollinariella Zeller, 1839
- Elachista pollutella Duponchel, 1843
- Elachista pullicomella Zeller, 1839
- Elachista subalbidella Schlager, 1847
- Elachista subocellea (Stephens, 1834)
- Elachista unifasciella (Haworth, 1828)
- Elachista albidella Nylander, 1848
- Elachista albifrontella (Hübner, 1817)
- Elachista alpinella Stainton, 1854
- Elachista anserinella Zeller, 1839
- Elachista apicipunctella Stainton, 1849
- Elachista atricomella Stainton, 1849
- Elachista biatomella (Stainton, 1848)
- Elachista bifasciella Treitschke, 1833
- Elachista canapennella (Hübner, 1813)
- Elachista cinereopunctella (Haworth, 1828)
- Elachista exactella (Herrich-Schäffer, 1855)
- Elachista freyerella (Hübner, 1825)
- Elachista geminatella (Herrich-Schäffer, 1855)
- Elachista gleichenella (Fabricius, 1781)
- Elachista herrichii Frey, 1859
- Elachista humilis Zeller, 1850
- Elachista lastrella Chretien, 1896
- Elachista luticomella Zeller, 1839
- Elachista maculicerusella (Bruand, 1859)
- Elachista nobilella Zeller, 1839
- Elachista poae Stainton, 1855
- Elachista quadripunctella (Hübner, 1825)
- Elachista rufocinerea (Haworth, 1828)
- Elachista scirpi Stainton, 1887
- Elachista subnigrella Douglas, 1853
- Elachista trapeziella Stainton, 1849
- Elachista utonella Frey, 1856
- Ethmia bipunctella (Fabricius, 1775)
- Ethmia chrysopyga (Zeller, 1844)
- Ethmia dodecea (Haworth, 1828)
- Ethmia quadrillella (Goeze, 1783)
- Ethmia terminella T. B. Fletcher, 1938
- Exaeretia allisella Stainton, 1849
- Luquetia lobella (Denis & Schiffermüller, 1775)
- Orophia ferrugella (Denis & Schiffermüller, 1775)
- Orophia sordidella (Hübner, 1796)
- Perittia farinella (Thunberg, 1794)
- Perittia obscurepunctella (Stainton, 1848)
- Semioscopis avellanella (Hübner, 1793)
- Semioscopis oculella (Thunberg, 1794)
- Semioscopis steinkellneriana (Denis & Schiffermüller, 1775)
- Spuleria flavicaput (Haworth, 1828)
- Stephensia brunnichella (Linnaeus, 1767)

=== Endromidae ===
- Endromis versicolora (Linnaeus, 1758)

=== Epermeniidae ===
- Epermenia chaerophyllella (Goeze, 1783)
- Epermenia falciformis (Haworth, 1828)
- Epermenia illigerella (Hübner, 1813)
- Phaulernis dentella (Zeller, 1839)
- Phaulernis fulviguttella (Zeller, 1839)

=== Erebidae ===
- Amata phegea (Linnaeus, 1758)
- Arctia caja (Linnaeus, 1758)
- Arctia festiva (Hufnagel, 1766)
- Arctia villica (Linnaeus, 1758)
- Arctornis l-nigrum (Muller, 1764)
- Atolmis rubricollis (Linnaeus, 1758)
- Callimorpha dominula (Linnaeus, 1758)
- Calliteara pudibunda (Linnaeus, 1758)
- Catephia alchymista (Denis & Schiffermüller, 1775)
- Catocala electa (Vieweg, 1790)
- Catocala fraxini (Linnaeus, 1758)
- Catocala fulminea (Scopoli, 1763)
- Catocala nupta (Linnaeus, 1767)
- Catocala promissa (Denis & Schiffermüller, 1775)
- Catocala sponsa (Linnaeus, 1767)
- Colobochyla salicalis (Denis & Schiffermüller, 1775)
- Coscinia cribraria (Linnaeus, 1758)
- Coscinia striata (Linnaeus, 1758)
- Cybosia mesomella (Linnaeus, 1758)
- Diacrisia sannio (Linnaeus, 1758)
- Diaphora mendica (Clerck, 1759)
- Dicallomera fascelina (Linnaeus, 1758)
- Dysauxes ancilla (Linnaeus, 1767)
- Eilema caniola (Hübner, 1808)
- Eilema complana (Linnaeus, 1758)
- Eilema depressa (Esper, 1787)
- Eilema griseola (Hübner, 1803)
- Eilema lurideola (Zincken, 1817)
- Eilema lutarella (Linnaeus, 1758)
- Eilema palliatella (Scopoli, 1763)
- Eilema pygmaeola (Doubleday, 1847)
- Eilema sororcula (Hufnagel, 1766)
- Eublemma minutata (Fabricius, 1794)
- Eublemma parva (Hübner, 1808)
- Euclidia mi (Clerck, 1759)
- Euclidia glyphica (Linnaeus, 1758)
- Euplagia quadripunctaria (Poda, 1761)
- Euproctis chrysorrhoea (Linnaeus, 1758)
- Euproctis similis (Fuessly, 1775)
- Herminia grisealis (Denis & Schiffermüller, 1775)
- Herminia tarsicrinalis (Knoch, 1782)
- Herminia tarsipennalis (Treitschke, 1835)
- Hypena crassalis (Fabricius, 1787)
- Hypena proboscidalis (Linnaeus, 1758)
- Hypena rostralis (Linnaeus, 1758)
- Hypenodes humidalis Doubleday, 1850
- Hyphoraia aulica (Linnaeus, 1758)
- Laelia coenosa (Hübner, 1808)
- Laspeyria flexula (Denis & Schiffermüller, 1775)
- Leucoma salicis (Linnaeus, 1758)
- Lithosia quadra (Linnaeus, 1758)
- Lygephila craccae (Denis & Schiffermüller, 1775)
- Lygephila pastinum (Treitschke, 1826)
- Lygephila viciae (Hübner, 1822)
- Lymantria dispar (Linnaeus, 1758)
- Lymantria monacha (Linnaeus, 1758)
- Macrochilo cribrumalis (Hübner, 1793)
- Miltochrista miniata (Forster, 1771)
- Minucia lunaris (Denis & Schiffermüller, 1775)
- Nudaria mundana (Linnaeus, 1761)
- Orgyia antiquoides (Hübner, 1822)
- Orgyia recens (Hübner, 1819)
- Orgyia antiqua (Linnaeus, 1758)
- Paidia rica (Freyer, 1858)
- Paracolax tristalis (Fabricius, 1794)
- Parascotia fuliginaria (Linnaeus, 1761)
- Parasemia plantaginis (Linnaeus, 1758)
- Pechipogo plumigeralis Hübner, 1825
- Pechipogo strigilata (Linnaeus, 1758)
- Pelosia muscerda (Hufnagel, 1766)
- Pelosia obtusa (Herrich-Schäffer, 1852)
- Phragmatobia fuliginosa (Linnaeus, 1758)
- Phragmatobia luctifera (Denis & Schiffermüller, 1775)
- Phytometra viridaria (Clerck, 1759)
- Polypogon tentacularia (Linnaeus, 1758)
- Rhyparia purpurata (Linnaeus, 1758)
- Rhyparioides metelkana (Lederer, 1861)
- Rivula sericealis (Scopoli, 1763)
- Schrankia costaestrigalis (Stephens, 1834)
- Schrankia taenialis (Hübner, 1809)
- Scoliopteryx libatrix (Linnaeus, 1758)
- Setina irrorella (Linnaeus, 1758)
- Spilosoma lubricipeda (Linnaeus, 1758)
- Spilosoma lutea (Hufnagel, 1766)
- Spilosoma urticae (Esper, 1789)
- Thumatha senex (Hübner, 1808)
- Trisateles emortualis (Denis & Schiffermüller, 1775)
- Tyria jacobaeae (Linnaeus, 1758)
- Utetheisa pulchella (Linnaeus, 1758)
- Zanclognatha lunalis (Scopoli, 1763)

=== Eriocraniidae ===
- Dyseriocrania subpurpurella (Haworth, 1828)
- Eriocrania cicatricella (Zetterstedt, 1839)
- Eriocrania salopiella (Stainton, 1854)
- Eriocrania sangii (Wood, 1891)
- Eriocrania semipurpurella (Stephens, 1835)
- Eriocrania sparrmannella (Bosc, 1791)
- Heringocrania unimaculella (Zetterstedt, 1839)
- Paracrania chrysolepidella (Zeller, 1851)

=== Gelechiidae ===
- Acompsia cinerella (Clerck, 1759)
- Acompsia schmidtiellus (Heyden, 1848)
- Altenia scriptella (Hübner, 1796)
- Anacampsis blattariella (Hübner, 1796)
- Anacampsis obscurella (Denis & Schiffermüller, 1775)
- Anacampsis populella (Clerck, 1759)
- Anacampsis scintillella (Fischer von Röslerstamm, 1841)
- Anarsia lineatella Zeller, 1839
- Anarsia spartiella (Schrank, 1802)
- Apodia bifractella (Duponchel, 1843)
- Aproaerema anthyllidella (Hübner, 1813)
- Argolamprotes micella (Denis & Schiffermüller, 1775)
- Aristotelia brizella (Treitschke, 1833)
- Aristotelia decurtella (Hübner, 1813)
- Aristotelia ericinella (Zeller, 1839)
- Aroga velocella (Duponchel, 1838)
- Athrips mouffetella (Linnaeus, 1758)
- Athrips pruinosella (Lienig & Zeller, 1846)
- Athrips rancidella (Herrich-Schäffer, 1854)
- Brachmia blandella (Fabricius, 1798)
- Brachmia dimidiella (Denis & Schiffermüller, 1775)
- Brachmia inornatella (Douglas, 1850)
- Bryotropha affinis (Haworth, 1828)
- Bryotropha basaltinella (Zeller, 1839)
- Bryotropha desertella (Douglas, 1850)
- Bryotropha domestica (Haworth, 1828)
- Bryotropha galbanella (Zeller, 1839)
- Bryotropha senectella (Zeller, 1839)
- Bryotropha similis (Stainton, 1854)
- Bryotropha terrella (Denis & Schiffermüller, 1775)
- Bryotropha umbrosella (Zeller, 1839)
- Carpatolechia alburnella (Zeller, 1839)
- Carpatolechia decorella (Haworth, 1812)
- Carpatolechia fugacella (Zeller, 1839)
- Carpatolechia fugitivella (Zeller, 1839)
- Carpatolechia notatella (Hübner, 1813)
- Carpatolechia proximella (Hübner, 1796)
- Caryocolum alsinella (Zeller, 1868)
- Caryocolum blandella (Douglas, 1852)
- Caryocolum cauligenella (Schmid, 1863)
- Caryocolum huebneri (Haworth, 1828)
- Caryocolum junctella (Douglas, 1851)
- Caryocolum kroesmanniella (Herrich-Schäffer, 1854)
- Caryocolum marmorea (Haworth, 1828)
- Caryocolum tricolorella (Haworth, 1812)
- Chionodes continuella (Zeller, 1839)
- Chionodes distinctella (Zeller, 1839)
- Chionodes electella (Zeller, 1839)
- Chionodes fumatella (Douglas, 1850)
- Chionodes tragicella (Heyden, 1865)
- Chrysoesthia drurella (Fabricius, 1775)
- Chrysoesthia sexguttella (Thunberg, 1794)
- Dichomeris alacella (Zeller, 1839)
- Dichomeris derasella (Denis & Schiffermüller, 1775)
- Dichomeris limosellus (Schlager, 1849)
- Dichomeris marginella (Fabricius, 1781)
- Dichomeris ustalella (Fabricius, 1794)
- Eulamprotes atrella (Denis & Schiffermüller, 1775)
- Eulamprotes superbella (Zeller, 1839)
- Eulamprotes unicolorella (Duponchel, 1843)
- Eulamprotes wilkella (Linnaeus, 1758)
- Exoteleia dodecella (Linnaeus, 1758)
- Filatima spurcella (Duponchel, 1843)
- Gelechia hippophaella (Schrank, 1802)
- Gelechia muscosella Zeller, 1839
- Gelechia nigra (Haworth, 1828)
- Gelechia rhombella (Denis & Schiffermüller, 1775)
- Gelechia sabinellus (Zeller, 1839)
- Gelechia scotinella Herrich-Schäffer, 1854
- Gelechia senticetella (Staudinger, 1859)
- Gelechia sororculella (Hübner, 1817)
- Gelechia turpella (Denis & Schiffermüller, 1775)
- Helcystogramma lutatella (Herrich-Schäffer, 1854)
- Helcystogramma rufescens (Haworth, 1828)
- Helcystogramma triannulella (Herrich-Schäffer, 1854)
- Hypatima rhomboidella (Linnaeus, 1758)
- Isophrictis striatella (Denis & Schiffermüller, 1775)
- Mesophleps silacella (Hübner, 1796)
- Metzneria aestivella (Zeller, 1839)
- Metzneria aprilella (Herrich-Schäffer, 1854)
- Metzneria lappella (Linnaeus, 1758)
- Metzneria metzneriella (Stainton, 1851)
- Metzneria neuropterella (Zeller, 1839)
- Mirificarma eburnella (Denis & Schiffermüller, 1775)
- Mirificarma interrupta (Curtis, 1827)
- Mirificarma lentiginosella (Zeller, 1839)
- Mirificarma mulinella (Zeller, 1839)
- Monochroa conspersella (Herrich-Schäffer, 1854)
- Monochroa cytisella (Curtis, 1837)
- Monochroa divisella (Douglas, 1850)
- Monochroa lucidella (Stephens, 1834)
- Monochroa lutulentella (Zeller, 1839)
- Monochroa moyses Uffen, 1991
- Monochroa palustrellus (Douglas, 1850)
- Monochroa tenebrella (Hübner, 1817)
- Monochroa tetragonella (Stainton, 1885)
- Neofaculta ericetella (Geyer, 1832)
- Neofaculta infernella (Herrich-Schäffer, 1854)
- Neofriseria peliella (Treitschke, 1835)
- Neotelphusa sequax (Haworth, 1828)
- Nothris lemniscellus (Zeller, 1839)
- Nothris verbascella (Denis & Schiffermüller, 1775)
- Parachronistis albiceps (Zeller, 1839)
- Pexicopia malvella (Hübner, 1805)
- Phthorimaea operculella (Zeller, 1873)
- Platyedra subcinerea (Haworth, 1828)
- Prolita sexpunctella (Fabricius, 1794)
- Prolita solutella (Zeller, 1839)
- Pseudotelphusa paripunctella (Thunberg, 1794)
- Pseudotelphusa scalella (Scopoli, 1763)
- Psoricoptera gibbosella (Zeller, 1839)
- Psoricoptera speciosella Teich, 1893
- Ptocheuusa paupella (Zeller, 1847)
- Recurvaria leucatella (Clerck, 1759)
- Recurvaria nanella (Denis & Schiffermüller, 1775)
- Scrobipalpa acuminatella (Sircom, 1850)
- Scrobipalpa artemisiella (Treitschke, 1833)
- Scrobipalpa atriplicella (Fischer von Röslerstamm, 1841)
- Scrobipalpa brahmiella (Heyden, 1862)
- Scrobipalpa costella (Humphreys & Westwood, 1845)
- Scrobipalpa instabilella (Douglas, 1846)
- Scrobipalpa nitentella (Fuchs, 1902)
- Scrobipalpa obsoletella (Fischer von Röslerstamm, 1841)
- Scrobipalpa ocellatella (Boyd, 1858)
- Scrobipalpa proclivella (Fuchs, 1886)
- Scrobipalpa salicorniae (E. Hering, 1889)
- Scrobipalpa samadensis (Pfaffenzeller, 1870)
- Sitotroga cerealella (Olivier, 1789)
- Sophronia humerella (Denis & Schiffermüller, 1775)
- Sophronia semicostella (Hübner, 1813)
- Stenolechia gemmella (Linnaeus, 1758)
- Stenolechiodes pseudogemmellus Elsner, 1996
- Syncopacma albipalpella (Herrich-Schäffer, 1854)
- Syncopacma captivella (Herrich-Schäffer, 1854)
- Syncopacma cinctella (Clerck, 1759)
- Syncopacma larseniella Gozmany, 1957
- Syncopacma taeniolella (Zeller, 1839)
- Teleiodes flavimaculella (Herrich-Schäffer, 1854)
- Teleiodes luculella (Hübner, 1813)
- Teleiodes saltuum (Zeller, 1878)
- Teleiodes vulgella (Denis & Schiffermüller, 1775)
- Teleiopsis diffinis (Haworth, 1828)
- Teleiopsis rosalbella (Fologne, 1862)
- Thiotricha subocellea (Stephens, 1834)

=== Geometridae ===
- Abraxas grossulariata (Linnaeus, 1758)
- Abraxas sylvata (Scopoli, 1763)
- Acasis viretata (Hübner, 1799)
- Adactylotis contaminaria (Hübner, 1813)
- Aethalura punctulata (Denis & Schiffermüller, 1775)
- Agriopis aurantiaria (Hübner, 1799)
- Agriopis bajaria (Denis & Schiffermüller, 1775)
- Agriopis leucophaearia (Denis & Schiffermüller, 1775)
- Agriopis marginaria (Fabricius, 1776)
- Alcis bastelbergeri (Hirschke, 1908)
- Alcis repandata (Linnaeus, 1758)
- Aleucis distinctata (Herrich-Schäffer, 1839)
- Alsophila aceraria (Denis & Schiffermüller, 1775)
- Alsophila aescularia (Denis & Schiffermüller, 1775)
- Angerona prunaria (Linnaeus, 1758)
- Anticlea derivata (Denis & Schiffermüller, 1775)
- Anticollix sparsata (Treitschke, 1828)
- Apeira syringaria (Linnaeus, 1758)
- Aplasta ononaria (Fuessly, 1783)
- Aplocera efformata (Guenee, 1858)
- Aplocera plagiata (Linnaeus, 1758)
- Aplocera praeformata (Hübner, 1826)
- Apocheima hispidaria (Denis & Schiffermüller, 1775)
- Archiearis parthenias (Linnaeus, 1761)
- Aspitates gilvaria (Denis & Schiffermüller, 1775)
- Aspitates ochrearia (Rossi, 1794)
- Asthena albulata (Hufnagel, 1767)
- Asthena anseraria (Herrich-Schäffer, 1855)
- Biston betularia (Linnaeus, 1758)
- Biston strataria (Hufnagel, 1767)
- Boudinotiana notha (Hübner, 1803)
- Bupalus piniaria (Linnaeus, 1758)
- Cabera exanthemata (Scopoli, 1763)
- Cabera pusaria (Linnaeus, 1758)
- Campaea honoraria (Denis & Schiffermüller, 1775)
- Campaea margaritaria (Linnaeus, 1761)
- Camptogramma bilineata (Linnaeus, 1758)
- Cataclysme riguata (Hübner, 1813)
- Catarhoe cuculata (Hufnagel, 1767)
- Catarhoe rubidata (Denis & Schiffermüller, 1775)
- Cepphis advenaria (Hübner, 1790)
- Charissa obscurata (Denis & Schiffermüller, 1775)
- Charissa pullata (Denis & Schiffermüller, 1775)
- Chesias legatella (Denis & Schiffermüller, 1775)
- Chesias rufata (Fabricius, 1775)
- Chiasmia clathrata (Linnaeus, 1758)
- Chlorissa cloraria (Hübner, 1813)
- Chlorissa viridata (Linnaeus, 1758)
- Chloroclysta miata (Linnaeus, 1758)
- Chloroclysta siterata (Hufnagel, 1767)
- Chloroclystis v-ata (Haworth, 1809)
- Cidaria fulvata (Forster, 1771)
- Cleora cinctaria (Denis & Schiffermüller, 1775)
- Cleorodes lichenaria (Hufnagel, 1767)
- Coenotephria salicata (Denis & Schiffermüller, 1775)
- Colostygia multistrigaria (Haworth, 1809)
- Colostygia olivata (Denis & Schiffermüller, 1775)
- Colostygia pectinataria (Knoch, 1781)
- Colotois pennaria (Linnaeus, 1761)
- Comibaena bajularia (Denis & Schiffermüller, 1775)
- Cosmorhoe ocellata (Linnaeus, 1758)
- Costaconvexa polygrammata (Borkhausen, 1794)
- Crocallis elinguaria (Linnaeus, 1758)
- Cyclophora linearia (Hübner, 1799)
- Cyclophora porata (Linnaeus, 1767)
- Cyclophora punctaria (Linnaeus, 1758)
- Cyclophora albipunctata (Hufnagel, 1767)
- Cyclophora annularia (Fabricius, 1775)
- Cyclophora pendularia (Clerck, 1759)
- Cyclophora puppillaria (Hübner, 1799)
- Cyclophora quercimontaria (Bastelberger, 1897)
- Cyclophora ruficiliaria (Herrich-Schäffer, 1855)
- Deileptenia ribeata (Clerck, 1759)
- Dyscia fagaria (Thunberg, 1784)
- Dysstroma citrata (Linnaeus, 1761)
- Dysstroma truncata (Hufnagel, 1767)
- Earophila badiata (Denis & Schiffermüller, 1775)
- Ecliptopera capitata (Herrich-Schäffer, 1839)
- Ecliptopera silaceata (Denis & Schiffermüller, 1775)
- Ectropis crepuscularia (Denis & Schiffermüller, 1775)
- Electrophaes corylata (Thunberg, 1792)
- Elophos dilucidaria (Denis & Schiffermüller, 1775)
- Ematurga atomaria (Linnaeus, 1758)
- Ennomos alniaria (Linnaeus, 1758)
- Ennomos autumnaria (Werneburg, 1859)
- Ennomos erosaria (Denis & Schiffermüller, 1775)
- Ennomos fuscantaria (Haworth, 1809)
- Ennomos quercinaria (Hufnagel, 1767)
- Epione repandaria (Hufnagel, 1767)
- Epione vespertaria (Linnaeus, 1767)
- Epirranthis diversata (Denis & Schiffermüller, 1775)
- Epirrhoe alternata (Muller, 1764)
- Epirrhoe galiata (Denis & Schiffermüller, 1775)
- Epirrhoe hastulata (Hübner, 1790)
- Epirrhoe molluginata (Hübner, 1813)
- Epirrhoe rivata (Hübner, 1813)
- Epirrhoe tristata (Linnaeus, 1758)
- Epirrita autumnata (Borkhausen, 1794)
- Epirrita christyi (Allen, 1906)
- Epirrita dilutata (Denis & Schiffermüller, 1775)
- Erannis defoliaria (Clerck, 1759)
- Euchoeca nebulata (Scopoli, 1763)
- Eulithis mellinata (Fabricius, 1787)
- Eulithis populata (Linnaeus, 1758)
- Eulithis prunata (Linnaeus, 1758)
- Eulithis testata (Linnaeus, 1761)
- Euphyia biangulata (Haworth, 1809)
- Euphyia frustata (Treitschke, 1828)
- Euphyia unangulata (Haworth, 1809)
- Eupithecia abbreviata Stephens, 1831
- Eupithecia abietaria (Goeze, 1781)
- Eupithecia absinthiata (Clerck, 1759)
- Eupithecia actaeata Walderdorff, 1869
- Eupithecia analoga Djakonov, 1926
- Eupithecia assimilata Doubleday, 1856
- Eupithecia cauchiata (Duponchel, 1831)
- Eupithecia centaureata (Denis & Schiffermüller, 1775)
- Eupithecia denotata (Hübner, 1813)
- Eupithecia dodoneata Guenee, 1858
- Eupithecia egenaria Herrich-Schäffer, 1848
- Eupithecia exiguata (Hübner, 1813)
- Eupithecia expallidata Doubleday, 1856
- Eupithecia extraversaria Herrich-Schäffer, 1852
- Eupithecia haworthiata Doubleday, 1856
- Eupithecia icterata (de Villers, 1789)
- Eupithecia impurata (Hübner, 1813)
- Eupithecia indigata (Hübner, 1813)
- Eupithecia innotata (Hufnagel, 1767)
- Eupithecia insigniata (Hübner, 1790)
- Eupithecia intricata (Zetterstedt, 1839)
- Eupithecia inturbata (Hübner, 1817)
- Eupithecia irriguata (Hübner, 1813)
- Eupithecia lanceata (Hübner, 1825)
- Eupithecia laquaearia Herrich-Schäffer, 1848
- Eupithecia lariciata (Freyer, 1841)
- Eupithecia linariata (Denis & Schiffermüller, 1775)
- Eupithecia millefoliata Rossler, 1866
- Eupithecia nanata (Hübner, 1813)
- Eupithecia pimpinellata (Hübner, 1813)
- Eupithecia plumbeolata (Haworth, 1809)
- Eupithecia pulchellata Stephens, 1831
- Eupithecia pusillata (Denis & Schiffermüller, 1775)
- Eupithecia pygmaeata (Hübner, 1799)
- Eupithecia satyrata (Hübner, 1813)
- Eupithecia selinata Herrich-Schäffer, 1861
- Eupithecia semigraphata Bruand, 1850
- Eupithecia simpliciata (Haworth, 1809)
- Eupithecia subfuscata (Haworth, 1809)
- Eupithecia subumbrata (Denis & Schiffermüller, 1775)
- Eupithecia succenturiata (Linnaeus, 1758)
- Eupithecia tantillaria Boisduval, 1840
- Eupithecia tenuiata (Hübner, 1813)
- Eupithecia tripunctaria Herrich-Schäffer, 1852
- Eupithecia trisignaria Herrich-Schäffer, 1848
- Eupithecia valerianata (Hübner, 1813)
- Eupithecia venosata (Fabricius, 1787)
- Eupithecia virgaureata Doubleday, 1861
- Eupithecia vulgata (Haworth, 1809)
- Eustroma reticulata (Denis & Schiffermüller, 1775)
- Fagivorina arenaria (Hufnagel, 1767)
- Gagitodes sagittata (Fabricius, 1787)
- Gandaritis pyraliata (Denis & Schiffermüller, 1775)
- Geometra papilionaria (Linnaeus, 1758)
- Gnophos furvata (Denis & Schiffermüller, 1775)
- Gymnoscelis rufifasciata (Haworth, 1809)
- Hemistola chrysoprasaria (Esper, 1795)
- Hemithea aestivaria (Hübner, 1789)
- Horisme aquata (Hübner, 1813)
- Horisme tersata (Denis & Schiffermüller, 1775)
- Horisme vitalbata (Denis & Schiffermüller, 1775)
- Hydrelia flammeolaria (Hufnagel, 1767)
- Hydrelia sylvata (Denis & Schiffermüller, 1775)
- Hydria cervinalis (Scopoli, 1763)
- Hydria undulata (Linnaeus, 1758)
- Hydriomena furcata (Thunberg, 1784)
- Hydriomena impluviata (Denis & Schiffermüller, 1775)
- Hydriomena ruberata (Freyer, 1831)
- Hylaea fasciaria (Linnaeus, 1758)
- Hypomecis punctinalis (Scopoli, 1763)
- Hypomecis roboraria (Denis & Schiffermüller, 1775)
- Hypoxystis pluviaria (Fabricius, 1787)
- Idaea aversata (Linnaeus, 1758)
- Idaea biselata (Hufnagel, 1767)
- Idaea deversaria (Herrich-Schäffer, 1847)
- Idaea dilutaria (Hübner, 1799)
- Idaea dimidiata (Hufnagel, 1767)
- Idaea emarginata (Linnaeus, 1758)
- Idaea fuscovenosa (Goeze, 1781)
- Idaea humiliata (Hufnagel, 1767)
- Idaea inquinata (Scopoli, 1763)
- Idaea laevigata (Scopoli, 1763)
- Idaea macilentaria (Herrich-Schäffer, 1847)
- Idaea muricata (Hufnagel, 1767)
- Idaea ochrata (Scopoli, 1763)
- Idaea pallidata (Denis & Schiffermüller, 1775)
- Idaea rufaria (Hübner, 1799)
- Idaea rusticata (Denis & Schiffermüller, 1775)
- Idaea seriata (Schrank, 1802)
- Idaea serpentata (Hufnagel, 1767)
- Idaea straminata (Borkhausen, 1794)
- Idaea subsericeata (Haworth, 1809)
- Idaea sylvestraria (Hübner, 1799)
- Idaea trigeminata (Haworth, 1809)
- Isturgia famula (Esper, 1787)
- Isturgia limbaria (Fabricius, 1775)
- Jodis lactearia (Linnaeus, 1758)
- Jodis putata (Linnaeus, 1758)
- Lampropteryx suffumata (Denis & Schiffermüller, 1775)
- Larentia clavaria (Haworth, 1809)
- Ligdia adustata (Denis & Schiffermüller, 1775)
- Lithostege griseata (Denis & Schiffermüller, 1775)
- Lobophora halterata (Hufnagel, 1767)
- Lomaspilis marginata (Linnaeus, 1758)
- Lomographa bimaculata (Fabricius, 1775)
- Lomographa temerata (Denis & Schiffermüller, 1775)
- Lycia hirtaria (Clerck, 1759)
- Lycia zonaria (Denis & Schiffermüller, 1775)
- Lythria cruentaria (Hufnagel, 1767)
- Macaria alternata (Denis & Schiffermüller, 1775)
- Macaria artesiaria (Denis & Schiffermüller, 1775)
- Macaria brunneata (Thunberg, 1784)
- Macaria liturata (Clerck, 1759)
- Macaria notata (Linnaeus, 1758)
- Macaria signaria (Hübner, 1809)
- Macaria wauaria (Linnaeus, 1758)
- Melanthia procellata (Denis & Schiffermüller, 1775)
- Menophra abruptaria (Thunberg, 1792)
- Mesoleuca albicillata (Linnaeus, 1758)
- Mesotype didymata (Linnaeus, 1758)
- Mesotype parallelolineata (Retzius, 1783)
- Minoa murinata (Scopoli, 1763)
- Nothocasis sertata (Hübner, 1817)
- Nycterosea obstipata (Fabricius, 1794)
- Odezia atrata (Linnaeus, 1758)
- Odontopera bidentata (Clerck, 1759)
- Operophtera brumata (Linnaeus, 1758)
- Operophtera fagata (Scharfenberg, 1805)
- Opisthograptis luteolata (Linnaeus, 1758)
- Orthonama vittata (Borkhausen, 1794)
- Ourapteryx sambucaria (Linnaeus, 1758)
- Pachycnemia hippocastanaria (Hübner, 1799)
- Paradarisa consonaria (Hübner, 1799)
- Parectropis similaria (Hufnagel, 1767)
- Pareulype berberata (Denis & Schiffermüller, 1775)
- Pasiphila chloerata (Mabille, 1870)
- Pasiphila debiliata (Hübner, 1817)
- Pasiphila rectangulata (Linnaeus, 1758)
- Pelurga comitata (Linnaeus, 1758)
- Pennithera firmata (Hübner, 1822)
- Perconia strigillaria (Hübner, 1787)
- Peribatodes ilicaria (Geyer, 1833)
- Peribatodes rhomboidaria (Denis & Schiffermüller, 1775)
- Peribatodes secundaria (Denis & Schiffermüller, 1775)
- Perizoma affinitata (Stephens, 1831)
- Perizoma albulata (Denis & Schiffermüller, 1775)
- Perizoma alchemillata (Linnaeus, 1758)
- Perizoma bifaciata (Haworth, 1809)
- Perizoma blandiata (Denis & Schiffermüller, 1775)
- Perizoma flavofasciata (Thunberg, 1792)
- Perizoma hydrata (Treitschke, 1829)
- Petrophora chlorosata (Scopoli, 1763)
- Phaiogramma etruscaria (Zeller, 1849)
- Phibalapteryx virgata (Hufnagel, 1767)
- Phigalia pilosaria (Denis & Schiffermüller, 1775)
- Philereme transversata (Hufnagel, 1767)
- Philereme vetulata (Denis & Schiffermüller, 1775)
- Plagodis dolabraria (Linnaeus, 1767)
- Plagodis pulveraria (Linnaeus, 1758)
- Plemyria rubiginata (Denis & Schiffermüller, 1775)
- Pseudopanthera macularia (Linnaeus, 1758)
- Pseudoterpna pruinata (Hufnagel, 1767)
- Pterapherapteryx sexalata (Retzius, 1783)
- Pungeleria capreolaria (Denis & Schiffermüller, 1775)
- Rheumaptera hastata (Linnaeus, 1758)
- Rheumaptera subhastata (Nolcken, 1870)
- Rhodometra sacraria (Linnaeus, 1767)
- Rhodostrophia vibicaria (Clerck, 1759)
- Scopula emutaria (Hübner, 1809)
- Scopula floslactata (Haworth, 1809)
- Scopula imitaria (Hübner, 1799)
- Scopula immutata (Linnaeus, 1758)
- Scopula incanata (Linnaeus, 1758)
- Scopula marginepunctata (Goeze, 1781)
- Scopula ternata Schrank, 1802
- Scopula corrivalaria (Kretschmar, 1862)
- Scopula decorata (Denis & Schiffermüller, 1775)
- Scopula immorata (Linnaeus, 1758)
- Scopula nigropunctata (Hufnagel, 1767)
- Scopula ornata (Scopoli, 1763)
- Scopula rubiginata (Hufnagel, 1767)
- Scopula tessellaria (Boisduval, 1840)
- Scopula umbelaria (Hübner, 1813)
- Scopula virgulata (Denis & Schiffermüller, 1775)
- Scotopteryx bipunctaria (Denis & Schiffermüller, 1775)
- Scotopteryx chenopodiata (Linnaeus, 1758)
- Scotopteryx luridata (Hufnagel, 1767)
- Scotopteryx moeniata (Scopoli, 1763)
- Scotopteryx mucronata (Scopoli, 1763)
- Selenia dentaria (Fabricius, 1775)
- Selenia lunularia (Hübner, 1788)
- Selenia tetralunaria (Hufnagel, 1767)
- Selidosema brunnearia (de Villers, 1789)
- Siona lineata (Scopoli, 1763)
- Spargania luctuata (Denis & Schiffermüller, 1775)
- Stegania cararia (Hübner, 1790)
- Stegania trimaculata (de Villers, 1789)
- Synopsia sociaria (Hübner, 1799)
- Tephronia sepiaria (Hufnagel, 1767)
- Thalera fimbrialis (Scopoli, 1763)
- Thera britannica (Turner, 1925)
- Thera cognata (Thunberg, 1792)
- Thera juniperata (Linnaeus, 1758)
- Thera obeliscata (Hübner, 1787)
- Thera variata (Denis & Schiffermüller, 1775)
- Thera vetustata (Denis & Schiffermüller, 1775)
- Theria primaria (Haworth, 1809)
- Theria rupicapraria (Denis & Schiffermüller, 1775)
- Thetidia smaragdaria (Fabricius, 1787)
- Timandra comae Schmidt, 1931
- Trichopteryx carpinata (Borkhausen, 1794)
- Trichopteryx polycommata (Denis & Schiffermüller, 1775)
- Triphosa dubitata (Linnaeus, 1758)
- Venusia blomeri (Curtis, 1832)
- Venusia cambrica Curtis, 1839
- Xanthorhoe biriviata (Borkhausen, 1794)
- Xanthorhoe designata (Hufnagel, 1767)
- Xanthorhoe ferrugata (Clerck, 1759)
- Xanthorhoe fluctuata (Linnaeus, 1758)
- Xanthorhoe montanata (Denis & Schiffermüller, 1775)
- Xanthorhoe quadrifasiata (Clerck, 1759)
- Xanthorhoe spadicearia (Denis & Schiffermüller, 1775)

=== Glyphipterigidae ===
- Acrolepia autumnitella Curtis, 1838
- Acrolepiopsis assectella (Zeller, 1839)
- Digitivalva arnicella (Heyden, 1863)
- Digitivalva reticulella (Hübner, 1796)
- Digitivalva granitella (Treitschke, 1833)
- Digitivalva pulicariae (Klimesch, 1956)
- Glyphipterix bergstraesserella (Fabricius, 1781)
- Glyphipterix equitella (Scopoli, 1763)
- Glyphipterix forsterella (Fabricius, 1781)
- Glyphipterix fuscoviridella (Haworth, 1828)
- Glyphipterix haworthana (Stephens, 1834)
- Glyphipterix heptaglyphella Le Marchand, 1925
- Glyphipterix schoenicolella Boyd, 1859
- Glyphipterix simpliciella (Stephens, 1834)
- Glyphipterix thrasonella (Scopoli, 1763)
- Orthotelia sparganella (Thunberg, 1788)

=== Gracillariidae ===
- Acrocercops brongniardella (Fabricius, 1798)
- Aspilapteryx tringipennella (Zeller, 1839)
- Callisto denticulella (Thunberg, 1794)
- Caloptilia alchimiella (Scopoli, 1763)
- Caloptilia azaleella (Brants, 1913)
- Caloptilia betulicola (M. Hering, 1928)
- Caloptilia cuculipennella (Hübner, 1796)
- Caloptilia elongella (Linnaeus, 1761)
- Caloptilia falconipennella (Hübner, 1813)
- Caloptilia hemidactylella (Denis & Schiffermüller, 1775)
- Caloptilia robustella Jackh, 1972
- Caloptilia roscipennella (Hübner, 1796)
- Caloptilia rufipennella (Hübner, 1796)
- Caloptilia semifascia (Haworth, 1828)
- Caloptilia stigmatella (Fabricius, 1781)
- Calybites phasianipennella (Hübner, 1813)
- Cameraria ohridella Deschka & Dimic, 1986
- Dialectica imperialella (Zeller, 1847)
- Euspilapteryx auroguttella Stephens, 1835
- Gracillaria syringella (Fabricius, 1794)
- Leucospilapteryx omissella (Stainton, 1848)
- Micrurapteryx kollariella (Zeller, 1839)
- Parectopa ononidis (Zeller, 1839)
- Parornix anglicella (Stainton, 1850)
- Parornix betulae (Stainton, 1854)
- Parornix carpinella (Frey, 1863)
- Parornix devoniella (Stainton, 1850)
- Parornix fagivora (Frey, 1861)
- Parornix finitimella (Zeller, 1850)
- Parornix scoticella (Stainton, 1850)
- Parornix torquillella (Zeller, 1850)
- Phyllocnistis labyrinthella (Bjerkander, 1790)
- Phyllocnistis saligna (Zeller, 1839)
- Phyllocnistis unipunctella (Stephens, 1834)
- Phyllocnistis xenia M. Hering, 1936
- Phyllonorycter acerifoliella (Zeller, 1839)
- Phyllonorycter anderidae (W. Fletcher, 1885)
- Phyllonorycter apparella (Herrich-Schäffer, 1855)
- Phyllonorycter blancardella (Fabricius, 1781)
- Phyllonorycter cavella (Zeller, 1846)
- Phyllonorycter cerasicolella (Herrich-Schäffer, 1855)
- Phyllonorycter cerasinella (Reutti, 1852)
- Phyllonorycter comparella (Duponchel, 1843)
- Phyllonorycter coryli (Nicelli, 1851)
- Phyllonorycter corylifoliella (Hübner, 1796)
- Phyllonorycter distentella (Zeller, 1846)
- Phyllonorycter dubitella (Herrich-Schäffer, 1855)
- Phyllonorycter emberizaepenella (Bouche, 1834)
- Phyllonorycter esperella (Goeze, 1783)
- Phyllonorycter froelichiella (Zeller, 1839)
- Phyllonorycter geniculella (Ragonot, 1874)
- Phyllonorycter harrisella (Linnaeus, 1761)
- Phyllonorycter heegeriella (Zeller, 1846)
- Phyllonorycter hilarella (Zetterstedt, 1839)
- Phyllonorycter insignitella (Zeller, 1846)
- Phyllonorycter joannisi (Le Marchand, 1936)
- Phyllonorycter junoniella (Zeller, 1846)
- Phyllonorycter klemannella (Fabricius, 1781)
- Phyllonorycter kuhlweiniella (Zeller, 1839)
- Phyllonorycter lantanella (Schrank, 1802)
- Phyllonorycter lautella (Zeller, 1846)
- Phyllonorycter leucographella (Zeller, 1850)
- Phyllonorycter maestingella (Muller, 1764)
- Phyllonorycter medicaginella (Gerasimov, 1930)
- Phyllonorycter mespilella (Hübner, 1805)
- Phyllonorycter messaniella (Zeller, 1846)
- Phyllonorycter muelleriella (Zeller, 1839)
- Phyllonorycter nicellii (Stainton, 1851)
- Phyllonorycter nigrescentella (Logan, 1851)
- Phyllonorycter oxyacanthae (Frey, 1856)
- Phyllonorycter pastorella (Zeller, 1846)
- Phyllonorycter platani (Staudinger, 1870)
- Phyllonorycter populifoliella (Treitschke, 1833)
- Phyllonorycter quercifoliella (Zeller, 1839)
- Phyllonorycter quinqueguttella (Stainton, 1851)
- Phyllonorycter rajella (Linnaeus, 1758)
- Phyllonorycter robiniella (Clemens, 1859)
- Phyllonorycter roboris (Zeller, 1839)
- Phyllonorycter sagitella (Bjerkander, 1790)
- Phyllonorycter salicicolella (Sircom, 1848)
- Phyllonorycter salictella (Zeller, 1846)
- Phyllonorycter schreberella (Fabricius, 1781)
- Phyllonorycter scopariella (Zeller, 1846)
- Phyllonorycter sorbi (Frey, 1855)
- Phyllonorycter spinicolella (Zeller, 1846)
- Phyllonorycter stettinensis (Nicelli, 1852)
- Phyllonorycter strigulatella (Lienig & Zeller, 1846)
- Phyllonorycter tenerella (de Joannis, 1915)
- Phyllonorycter trifasciella (Haworth, 1828)
- Phyllonorycter tristrigella (Haworth, 1828)
- Phyllonorycter ulmifoliella (Hübner, 1817)
- Phyllonorycter viminetorum (Stainton, 1854)
- Povolnya leucapennella (Stephens, 1835)
- Spulerina simploniella (Fischer von Röslerstamm, 1840)

=== Heliodinidae ===
- Heliodines roesella (Linnaeus, 1758)
- Antispila metallella (Denis & Schiffermüller, 1775)
- Antispila treitschkiella (Fischer von Röslerstamm, 1843)
- Heliozela resplendella (Stainton, 1851)
- Heliozela sericiella (Haworth, 1828)

=== Hepialidae ===
- Hepialus humuli (Linnaeus, 1758)
- Pharmacis fusconebulosa (DeGeer, 1778)
- Pharmacis lupulina (Linnaeus, 1758)
- Phymatopus hecta (Linnaeus, 1758)
- Triodia sylvina (Linnaeus, 1761)

=== Incurvariidae ===
- Incurvaria koerneriella (Zeller, 1839)
- Incurvaria masculella (Denis & Schiffermüller, 1775)
- Incurvaria oehlmanniella (Hübner, 1796)
- Incurvaria pectinea Haworth, 1828
- Incurvaria praelatella (Denis & Schiffermüller, 1775)
- Phylloporia bistrigella (Haworth, 1828)

=== Lasiocampidae ===
- Dendrolimus pini (Linnaeus, 1758)
- Eriogaster catax (Linnaeus, 1758)
- Eriogaster lanestris (Linnaeus, 1758)
- Euthrix potatoria (Linnaeus, 1758)
- Gastropacha quercifolia (Linnaeus, 1758)
- Gastropacha populifolia (Denis & Schiffermüller, 1775)
- Lasiocampa quercus (Linnaeus, 1758)
- Lasiocampa trifolii (Denis & Schiffermüller, 1775)
- Macrothylacia rubi (Linnaeus, 1758)
- Malacosoma castrensis (Linnaeus, 1758)
- Malacosoma neustria (Linnaeus, 1758)
- Odonestis pruni (Linnaeus, 1758)
- Phyllodesma ilicifolia (Linnaeus, 1758)
- Phyllodesma tremulifolia (Hübner, 1810)
- Poecilocampa populi (Linnaeus, 1758)
- Trichiura crataegi (Linnaeus, 1758)

=== Limacodidae ===
- Apoda limacodes (Hufnagel, 1766)
- Heterogenea asella (Denis & Schiffermüller, 1775)

=== Lyonetiidae ===
- Leucoptera laburnella (Stainton, 1851)
- Leucoptera lotella (Stainton, 1859)
- Leucoptera lustratella (Herrich-Schäffer, 1855)
- Leucoptera malifoliella (O. Costa, 1836)
- Leucoptera sinuella (Reutti, 1853)
- Leucoptera spartifoliella (Hübner, 1813)
- Lyonetia clerkella (Linnaeus, 1758)
- Lyonetia prunifoliella (Hübner, 1796)

=== Lypusidae ===
- Amphisbatis incongruella (Stainton, 1849)
- Lypusa maurella (Denis & Schiffermüller, 1775)
- Pseudatemelia flavifrontella (Denis & Schiffermüller, 1775)
- Pseudatemelia latipennella (Jackh, 1959)
- Pseudatemelia subochreella (Doubleday, 1859)
- Pseudatemelia josephinae (Toll, 1956)

=== Micropterigidae ===
- Micropterix aruncella (Scopoli, 1763)
- Micropterix aureatella (Scopoli, 1763)
- Micropterix calthella (Linnaeus, 1761)
- Micropterix schaefferi Heath, 1975
- Micropterix tunbergella (Fabricius, 1787)

=== Momphidae ===
- Mompha langiella (Hübner, 1796)
- Mompha idaei (Zeller, 1839)
- Mompha miscella (Denis & Schiffermüller, 1775)
- Mompha conturbatella (Hübner, 1819)
- Mompha divisella Herrich-Schäffer, 1854
- Mompha epilobiella (Denis & Schiffermüller, 1775)
- Mompha lacteella (Stephens, 1834)
- Mompha ochraceella (Curtis, 1839)
- Mompha propinquella (Stainton, 1851)
- Mompha sturnipennella (Treitschke, 1833)
- Mompha subbistrigella (Haworth, 1828)
- Mompha locupletella (Denis & Schiffermüller, 1775)
- Mompha raschkiella (Zeller, 1839)
- Mompha terminella (Humphreys & Westwood, 1845)

=== Nepticulidae ===
- Bohemannia quadrimaculella (Boheman, 1853)
- Ectoedemia agrimoniae (Frey, 1858)
- Ectoedemia albifasciella (Heinemann, 1871)
- Ectoedemia angulifasciella (Stainton, 1849)
- Ectoedemia arcuatella (Herrich-Schäffer, 1855)
- Ectoedemia argyropeza (Zeller, 1839)
- Ectoedemia atricollis (Stainton, 1857)
- Ectoedemia hannoverella (Glitz, 1872)
- Ectoedemia heringi (Toll, 1934)
- Ectoedemia intimella (Zeller, 1848)
- Ectoedemia occultella (Linnaeus, 1767)
- Ectoedemia quinquella (Bedell, 1848)
- Ectoedemia rubivora (Wocke, 1860)
- Ectoedemia spinosella (de Joannis, 1908)
- Ectoedemia subbimaculella (Haworth, 1828)
- Ectoedemia turbidella (Zeller, 1848)
- Ectoedemia decentella (Herrich-Schäffer, 1855)
- Ectoedemia sericopeza (Zeller, 1839)
- Ectoedemia septembrella (Stainton, 1849)
- Ectoedemia weaveri (Stainton, 1855)
- Ectoedemia longicaudella Klimesch, 1953
- Stigmella aceris (Frey, 1857)
- Stigmella aeneofasciella (Herrich-Schäffer, 1855)
- Stigmella alnetella (Stainton, 1856)
- Stigmella anomalella (Goeze, 1783)
- Stigmella assimilella (Zeller, 1848)
- Stigmella atricapitella (Haworth, 1828)
- Stigmella aurella (Fabricius, 1775)
- Stigmella basiguttella (Heinemann, 1862)
- Stigmella betulicola (Stainton, 1856)
- Stigmella carpinella (Heinemann, 1862)
- Stigmella catharticella (Stainton, 1853)
- Stigmella centifoliella (Zeller, 1848)
- Stigmella confusella (Wood & Walsingham, 1894)
- Stigmella continuella (Stainton, 1856)
- Stigmella crataegella (Klimesch, 1936)
- Stigmella floslactella (Haworth, 1828)
- Stigmella glutinosae (Stainton, 1858)
- Stigmella hemargyrella (Kollar, 1832)
- Stigmella hybnerella (Hübner, 1796)
- Stigmella incognitella (Herrich-Schäffer, 1855)
- Stigmella lapponica (Wocke, 1862)
- Stigmella lemniscella (Zeller, 1839)
- Stigmella luteella (Stainton, 1857)
- Stigmella malella (Stainton, 1854)
- Stigmella microtheriella (Stainton, 1854)
- Stigmella minusculella (Herrich-Schäffer, 1855)
- Stigmella myrtillella (Stainton, 1857)
- Stigmella nylandriella (Tengstrom, 1848)
- Stigmella obliquella (Heinemann, 1862)
- Stigmella oxyacanthella (Stainton, 1854)
- Stigmella perpygmaeella (Doubleday, 1859)
- Stigmella plagicolella (Stainton, 1854)
- Stigmella prunetorum (Stainton, 1855)
- Stigmella pyri (Glitz, 1865)
- Stigmella regiella (Herrich-Schäffer, 1855)
- Stigmella roborella (Johansson, 1971)
- Stigmella ruficapitella (Haworth, 1828)
- Stigmella sakhalinella Puplesis, 1984
- Stigmella salicis (Stainton, 1854)
- Stigmella samiatella (Zeller, 1839)
- Stigmella speciosa (Frey, 1858)
- Stigmella splendidissimella (Herrich-Schäffer, 1855)
- Stigmella thuringiaca (Petry, 1904)
- Stigmella tiliae (Frey, 1856)
- Stigmella tityrella (Stainton, 1854)
- Stigmella trimaculella (Haworth, 1828)
- Stigmella ulmivora (Fologne, 1860)
- Stigmella zelleriella (Snellen, 1875)
- Trifurcula immundella (Zeller, 1839)
- Trifurcula subnitidella (Duponchel, 1843)

=== Noctuidae ===
- Abrostola asclepiadis (Denis & Schiffermüller, 1775)
- Abrostola tripartita (Hufnagel, 1766)
- Abrostola triplasia (Linnaeus, 1758)
- Acontia trabealis (Scopoli, 1763)
- Acronicta aceris (Linnaeus, 1758)
- Acronicta leporina (Linnaeus, 1758)
- Acronicta strigosa (Denis & Schiffermüller, 1775)
- Acronicta alni (Linnaeus, 1767)
- Acronicta cuspis (Hübner, 1813)
- Acronicta psi (Linnaeus, 1758)
- Acronicta tridens (Denis & Schiffermüller, 1775)
- Acronicta auricoma (Denis & Schiffermüller, 1775)
- Acronicta euphorbiae (Denis & Schiffermüller, 1775)
- Acronicta menyanthidis (Esper, 1789)
- Acronicta rumicis (Linnaeus, 1758)
- Actebia praecox (Linnaeus, 1758)
- Actinotia polyodon (Clerck, 1759)
- Agrochola lychnidis (Denis & Schiffermüller, 1775)
- Agrochola helvola (Linnaeus, 1758)
- Agrochola humilis (Denis & Schiffermüller, 1775)
- Agrochola litura (Linnaeus, 1758)
- Agrochola lunosa (Haworth, 1809)
- Agrochola nitida (Denis & Schiffermüller, 1775)
- Agrochola lota (Clerck, 1759)
- Agrochola macilenta (Hübner, 1809)
- Agrochola circellaris (Hufnagel, 1766)
- Agrotis bigramma (Esper, 1790)
- Agrotis cinerea (Denis & Schiffermüller, 1775)
- Agrotis clavis (Hufnagel, 1766)
- Agrotis exclamationis (Linnaeus, 1758)
- Agrotis ipsilon (Hufnagel, 1766)
- Agrotis puta (Hübner, 1803)
- Agrotis ripae Hübner, 1823
- Agrotis segetum (Denis & Schiffermüller, 1775)
- Agrotis trux (Hübner, 1824)
- Agrotis vestigialis (Hufnagel, 1766)
- Allophyes oxyacanthae (Linnaeus, 1758)
- Ammoconia caecimacula (Denis & Schiffermüller, 1775)
- Amphipoea fucosa (Freyer, 1830)
- Amphipoea lucens (Freyer, 1845)
- Amphipoea oculea (Linnaeus, 1761)
- Amphipyra berbera Rungs, 1949
- Amphipyra perflua (Fabricius, 1787)
- Amphipyra pyramidea (Linnaeus, 1758)
- Amphipyra tragopoginis (Clerck, 1759)
- Anaplectoides prasina (Denis & Schiffermüller, 1775)
- Anarta myrtilli (Linnaeus, 1761)
- Anarta odontites (Boisduval, 1829)
- Anarta trifolii (Hufnagel, 1766)
- Anorthoa munda (Denis & Schiffermüller, 1775)
- Antitype chi (Linnaeus, 1758)
- Apamea anceps (Denis & Schiffermüller, 1775)
- Apamea aquila Donzel, 1837
- Apamea crenata (Hufnagel, 1766)
- Apamea epomidion (Haworth, 1809)
- Apamea furva (Denis & Schiffermüller, 1775)
- Apamea illyria Freyer, 1846
- Apamea lateritia (Hufnagel, 1766)
- Apamea lithoxylaea (Denis & Schiffermüller, 1775)
- Apamea monoglypha (Hufnagel, 1766)
- Apamea oblonga (Haworth, 1809)
- Apamea remissa (Hübner, 1809)
- Apamea scolopacina (Esper, 1788)
- Apamea sordens (Hufnagel, 1766)
- Apamea sublustris (Esper, 1788)
- Apamea unanimis (Hübner, 1813)
- Aporophyla australis (Boisduval, 1829)
- Aporophyla lueneburgensis (Freyer, 1848)
- Aporophyla nigra (Haworth, 1809)
- Apterogenum ypsillon (Denis & Schiffermüller, 1775)
- Archanara dissoluta (Treitschke, 1825)
- Archanara neurica (Hübner, 1808)
- Arenostola phragmitidis (Hübner, 1803)
- Asteroscopus sphinx (Hufnagel, 1766)
- Atethmia centrago (Haworth, 1809)
- Athetis gluteosa (Treitschke, 1835)
- Athetis pallustris (Hübner, 1808)
- Athetis hospes (Freyer, 1831)
- Autographa bractea (Denis & Schiffermüller, 1775)
- Autographa gamma (Linnaeus, 1758)
- Autographa jota (Linnaeus, 1758)
- Autographa pulchrina (Haworth, 1809)
- Axylia putris (Linnaeus, 1761)
- Brachionycha nubeculosa (Esper, 1785)
- Brachylomia viminalis (Fabricius, 1776)
- Bryophila raptricula (Denis & Schiffermüller, 1775)
- Bryophila ravula (Hübner, 1813)
- Bryophila domestica (Hufnagel, 1766)
- Calamia tridens (Hufnagel, 1766)
- Callopistria juventina (Stoll, 1782)
- Calophasia lunula (Hufnagel, 1766)
- Caradrina morpheus (Hufnagel, 1766)
- Caradrina clavipalpis Scopoli, 1763
- Caradrina selini Boisduval, 1840
- Celaena haworthii (Curtis, 1829)
- Ceramica pisi (Linnaeus, 1758)
- Cerapteryx graminis (Linnaeus, 1758)
- Cerastis leucographa (Denis & Schiffermüller, 1775)
- Cerastis rubricosa (Denis & Schiffermüller, 1775)
- Charanyca trigrammica (Hufnagel, 1766)
- Charanyca ferruginea (Esper, 1785)
- Chersotis margaritacea (Villers, 1789)
- Chersotis multangula (Hübner, 1803)
- Chilodes maritima (Tauscher, 1806)
- Chloantha hyperici (Denis & Schiffermüller, 1775)
- Chrysodeixis chalcites (Esper, 1789)
- Coenobia rufa (Haworth, 1809)
- Colocasia coryli (Linnaeus, 1758)
- Conistra ligula (Esper, 1791)
- Conistra rubiginosa (Scopoli, 1763)
- Conistra vaccinii (Linnaeus, 1761)
- Conistra erythrocephala (Denis & Schiffermüller, 1775)
- Conistra rubiginea (Denis & Schiffermüller, 1775)
- Coranarta cordigera (Thunberg, 1788)
- Cosmia trapezina (Linnaeus, 1758)
- Cosmia diffinis (Linnaeus, 1767)
- Cosmia pyralina (Denis & Schiffermüller, 1775)
- Cosmia affinis (Linnaeus, 1767)
- Craniophora ligustri (Denis & Schiffermüller, 1775)
- Cryphia algae (Fabricius, 1775)
- Crypsedra gemmea (Treitschke, 1825)
- Cucullia absinthii (Linnaeus, 1761)
- Cucullia artemisiae (Hufnagel, 1766)
- Cucullia asteris (Denis & Schiffermüller, 1775)
- Cucullia chamomillae (Denis & Schiffermüller, 1775)
- Cucullia gnaphalii (Hübner, 1813)
- Cucullia lactucae (Denis & Schiffermüller, 1775)
- Cucullia lucifuga (Denis & Schiffermüller, 1775)
- Cucullia umbratica (Linnaeus, 1758)
- Cucullia lychnitis Rambur, 1833
- Cucullia scrophulariae (Denis & Schiffermüller, 1775)
- Cucullia verbasci (Linnaeus, 1758)
- Deltote bankiana (Fabricius, 1775)
- Deltote deceptoria (Scopoli, 1763)
- Deltote uncula (Clerck, 1759)
- Deltote pygarga (Hufnagel, 1766)
- Denticucullus pygmina (Haworth, 1809)
- Diachrysia chrysitis (Linnaeus, 1758)
- Diachrysia chryson (Esper, 1789)
- Diarsia brunnea (Denis & Schiffermüller, 1775)
- Diarsia dahlii (Hübner, 1813)
- Diarsia florida (F. Schmidt, 1859)
- Diarsia mendica (Fabricius, 1775)
- Diarsia rubi (Vieweg, 1790)
- Dicycla oo (Linnaeus, 1758)
- Diloba caeruleocephala (Linnaeus, 1758)
- Dryobotodes eremita (Fabricius, 1775)
- Dypterygia scabriuscula (Linnaeus, 1758)
- Egira conspicillaris (Linnaeus, 1758)
- Elaphria venustula (Hübner, 1790)
- Enargia paleacea (Esper, 1788)
- Epilecta linogrisea (Denis & Schiffermüller, 1775)
- Episema glaucina (Esper, 1789)
- Eremobia ochroleuca (Denis & Schiffermüller, 1775)
- Euchalcia modestoides Poole, 1989
- Eugnorisma glareosa (Esper, 1788)
- Eugraphe sigma (Denis & Schiffermüller, 1775)
- Euplexia lucipara (Linnaeus, 1758)
- Eupsilia transversa (Hufnagel, 1766)
- Eurois occulta (Linnaeus, 1758)
- Euxoa aquilina (Denis & Schiffermüller, 1775)
- Euxoa cursoria (Hufnagel, 1766)
- Euxoa nigricans (Linnaeus, 1761)
- Euxoa nigrofusca (Esper, 1788)
- Euxoa obelisca (Denis & Schiffermüller, 1775)
- Euxoa tritici (Linnaeus, 1761)
- Globia algae (Esper, 1789)
- Globia sparganii (Esper, 1790)
- Gortyna flavago (Denis & Schiffermüller, 1775)
- Graphiphora augur (Fabricius, 1775)
- Griposia aprilina (Linnaeus, 1758)
- Hada plebeja (Linnaeus, 1761)
- Hadena perplexa (Denis & Schiffermüller, 1775)
- Hadena albimacula (Borkhausen, 1792)
- Hadena bicruris (Hufnagel, 1766)
- Hadena compta (Denis & Schiffermüller, 1775)
- Hadena confusa (Hufnagel, 1766)
- Hadena filograna (Esper, 1788)
- Hecatera bicolorata (Hufnagel, 1766)
- Hecatera dysodea (Denis & Schiffermüller, 1775)
- Helicoverpa armigera (Hübner, 1808)
- Heliothis maritima Graslin, 1855
- Heliothis peltigera (Denis & Schiffermüller, 1775)
- Heliothis viriplaca (Hufnagel, 1766)
- Helotropha leucostigma (Hübner, 1808)
- Hoplodrina ambigua (Denis & Schiffermüller, 1775)
- Hoplodrina blanda (Denis & Schiffermüller, 1775)
- Hoplodrina octogenaria (Goeze, 1781)
- Hoplodrina respersa (Denis & Schiffermüller, 1775)
- Hoplodrina superstes (Ochsenheimer, 1816)
- Hydraecia micacea (Esper, 1789)
- Hydraecia petasitis Doubleday, 1847
- Hyppa rectilinea (Esper, 1788)
- Ipimorpha retusa (Linnaeus, 1761)
- Ipimorpha subtusa (Denis & Schiffermüller, 1775)
- Jodia croceago (Denis & Schiffermüller, 1775)
- Lacanobia contigua (Denis & Schiffermüller, 1775)
- Lacanobia suasa (Denis & Schiffermüller, 1775)
- Lacanobia thalassina (Hufnagel, 1766)
- Lacanobia aliena (Hübner, 1809)
- Lacanobia oleracea (Linnaeus, 1758)
- Lacanobia w-latinum (Hufnagel, 1766)
- Lamprosticta culta (Denis & Schiffermüller, 1775)
- Lamprotes c-aureum (Knoch, 1781)
- Lasionycta proxima (Hübner, 1809)
- Lateroligia ophiogramma (Esper, 1794)
- Lenisa geminipuncta (Haworth, 1809)
- Leucania comma (Linnaeus, 1761)
- Leucania obsoleta (Hübner, 1803)
- Lithophane furcifera (Hufnagel, 1766)
- Lithophane lamda (Fabricius, 1787)
- Lithophane ornitopus (Hufnagel, 1766)
- Lithophane semibrunnea (Haworth, 1809)
- Lithophane socia (Hufnagel, 1766)
- Lithophane leautieri (Boisduval, 1829)
- Litoligia literosa (Haworth, 1809)
- Longalatedes elymi (Treitschke, 1825)
- Luperina dumerilii (Duponchel, 1826)
- Luperina testacea (Denis & Schiffermüller, 1775)
- Lycophotia molothina (Esper, 1789)
- Lycophotia porphyrea (Denis & Schiffermüller, 1775)
- Macdunnoughia confusa (Stephens, 1850)
- Mamestra brassicae (Linnaeus, 1758)
- Melanchra persicariae (Linnaeus, 1761)
- Mesapamea secalella Remm, 1983
- Mesapamea secalis (Linnaeus, 1758)
- Mesogona acetosellae (Denis & Schiffermüller, 1775)
- Mesogona oxalina (Hübner, 1803)
- Mesoligia furuncula (Denis & Schiffermüller, 1775)
- Mniotype adusta (Esper, 1790)
- Mniotype satura (Denis & Schiffermüller, 1775)
- Moma alpium (Osbeck, 1778)
- Mormo maura (Linnaeus, 1758)
- Mythimna albipuncta (Denis & Schiffermüller, 1775)
- Mythimna ferrago (Fabricius, 1787)
- Mythimna l-album (Linnaeus, 1767)
- Mythimna litoralis (Curtis, 1827)
- Mythimna conigera (Denis & Schiffermüller, 1775)
- Mythimna impura (Hübner, 1808)
- Mythimna pallens (Linnaeus, 1758)
- Mythimna pudorina (Denis & Schiffermüller, 1775)
- Mythimna straminea (Treitschke, 1825)
- Mythimna turca (Linnaeus, 1761)
- Mythimna vitellina (Hübner, 1808)
- Mythimna unipuncta (Haworth, 1809)
- Mythimna sicula (Treitschke, 1835)
- Naenia typica (Linnaeus, 1758)
- Noctua comes Hübner, 1813
- Noctua fimbriata (Schreber, 1759)
- Noctua interjecta Hübner, 1803
- Noctua janthe (Borkhausen, 1792)
- Noctua janthina Denis & Schiffermüller, 1775
- Noctua orbona (Hufnagel, 1766)
- Noctua pronuba (Linnaeus, 1758)
- Nonagria typhae (Thunberg, 1784)
- Nyctobrya muralis (Forster, 1771)
- Ochropleura plecta (Linnaeus, 1761)
- Oligia fasciuncula (Haworth, 1809)
- Oligia latruncula (Denis & Schiffermüller, 1775)
- Oligia strigilis (Linnaeus, 1758)
- Oligia versicolor (Borkhausen, 1792)
- Oria musculosa (Hübner, 1808)
- Orthosia gracilis (Denis & Schiffermüller, 1775)
- Orthosia opima (Hübner, 1809)
- Orthosia cerasi (Fabricius, 1775)
- Orthosia cruda (Denis & Schiffermüller, 1775)
- Orthosia miniosa (Denis & Schiffermüller, 1775)
- Orthosia populeti (Fabricius, 1775)
- Orthosia incerta (Hufnagel, 1766)
- Orthosia gothica (Linnaeus, 1758)
- Pabulatrix pabulatricula (Brahm, 1791)
- Pachetra sagittigera (Hufnagel, 1766)
- Panemeria tenebrata (Scopoli, 1763)
- Panolis flammea (Denis & Schiffermüller, 1775)
- Panthea coenobita (Esper, 1785)
- Papestra biren (Goeze, 1781)
- Paradiarsia punicea (Hübner, 1803)
- Parastichtis suspecta (Hübner, 1817)
- Peridroma saucia (Hübner, 1808)
- Periphanes delphinii (Linnaeus, 1758)
- Phlogophora meticulosa (Linnaeus, 1758)
- Phlogophora scita (Hübner, 1790)
- Photedes extrema (Hübner, 1809)
- Photedes fluxa (Hübner, 1809)
- Photedes minima (Haworth, 1809)
- Plusia festucae (Linnaeus, 1758)
- Plusia putnami (Grote, 1873)
- Polia bombycina (Hufnagel, 1766)
- Polia hepatica (Clerck, 1759)
- Polia nebulosa (Hufnagel, 1766)
- Polychrysia moneta (Fabricius, 1787)
- Polymixis lichenea (Hübner, 1813)
- Polymixis flavicincta (Denis & Schiffermüller, 1775)
- Protolampra sobrina (Duponchel, 1843)
- Pyrrhia umbra (Hufnagel, 1766)
- Rhizedra lutosa (Hübner, 1803)
- Rhyacia lucipeta (Denis & Schiffermüller, 1775)
- Rhyacia simulans (Hufnagel, 1766)
- Sedina buettneri (E. Hering, 1858)
- Senta flammea (Curtis, 1828)
- Sideridis rivularis (Fabricius, 1775)
- Sideridis reticulata (Goeze, 1781)
- Sideridis turbida (Esper, 1790)
- Simyra albovenosa (Goeze, 1781)
- Spaelotis ravida (Denis & Schiffermüller, 1775)
- Spodoptera exigua (Hübner, 1808)
- Subacronicta megacephala (Denis & Schiffermüller, 1775)
- Syngrapha interrogationis (Linnaeus, 1758)
- Thalpophila matura (Hufnagel, 1766)
- Tholera cespitis (Denis & Schiffermüller, 1775)
- Tholera decimalis (Poda, 1761)
- Tiliacea aurago (Denis & Schiffermüller, 1775)
- Tiliacea citrago (Linnaeus, 1758)
- Trachea atriplicis (Linnaeus, 1758)
- Trichoplusia ni (Hübner, 1803)
- Trigonophora flammea (Esper, 1785)
- Tyta luctuosa (Denis & Schiffermüller, 1775)
- Xanthia gilvago (Denis & Schiffermüller, 1775)
- Xanthia icteritia (Hufnagel, 1766)
- Xanthia ocellaris (Borkhausen, 1792)
- Xanthia ruticilla (Esper, 1791)
- Xanthia togata (Esper, 1788)
- Xestia c-nigrum (Linnaeus, 1758)
- Xestia ditrapezium (Denis & Schiffermüller, 1775)
- Xestia triangulum (Hufnagel, 1766)
- Xestia agathina (Duponchel, 1827)
- Xestia baja (Denis & Schiffermüller, 1775)
- Xestia castanea (Esper, 1798)
- Xestia sexstrigata (Haworth, 1809)
- Xestia stigmatica (Hübner, 1813)
- Xestia xanthographa (Denis & Schiffermüller, 1775)
- Xylena solidaginis (Hübner, 1803)
- Xylena exsoleta (Linnaeus, 1758)
- Xylena vetusta (Hübner, 1813)
- Xylocampa areola (Esper, 1789)

=== Nolidae ===
- Bena bicolorana (Fuessly, 1775)
- Earias clorana (Linnaeus, 1761)
- Meganola albula (Denis & Schiffermüller, 1775)
- Meganola strigula (Denis & Schiffermüller, 1775)
- Meganola togatulalis (Hübner, 1796)
- Nola aerugula (Hübner, 1793)
- Nola confusalis (Herrich-Schäffer, 1847)
- Nola cucullatella (Linnaeus, 1758)
- Nola holsatica Sauber, 1916
- Nola subchlamydula Staudinger, 1871
- Nycteola asiatica (Krulikovsky, 1904)
- Nycteola revayana (Scopoli, 1772)
- Pseudoips prasinana (Linnaeus, 1758)

=== Notodontidae ===
- Cerura erminea (Esper, 1783)
- Cerura vinula (Linnaeus, 1758)
- Clostera anachoreta (Denis & Schiffermüller, 1775)
- Clostera anastomosis (Linnaeus, 1758)
- Clostera curtula (Linnaeus, 1758)
- Clostera pigra (Hufnagel, 1766)
- Drymonia dodonaea (Denis & Schiffermüller, 1775)
- Drymonia obliterata (Esper, 1785)
- Drymonia querna (Denis & Schiffermüller, 1775)
- Drymonia ruficornis (Hufnagel, 1766)
- Drymonia velitaris (Hufnagel, 1766)
- Furcula bicuspis (Borkhausen, 1790)
- Furcula bifida (Brahm, 1787)
- Furcula furcula (Clerck, 1759)
- Gluphisia crenata (Esper, 1785)
- Harpyia milhauseri (Fabricius, 1775)
- Leucodonta bicoloria (Denis & Schiffermüller, 1775)
- Notodonta dromedarius (Linnaeus, 1767)
- Notodonta torva (Hübner, 1803)
- Notodonta tritophus (Denis & Schiffermüller, 1775)
- Notodonta ziczac (Linnaeus, 1758)
- Odontosia carmelita (Esper, 1799)
- Peridea anceps (Goeze, 1781)
- Phalera bucephala (Linnaeus, 1758)
- Pheosia gnoma (Fabricius, 1776)
- Pheosia tremula (Clerck, 1759)
- Pterostoma palpina (Clerck, 1759)
- Ptilodon capucina (Linnaeus, 1758)
- Ptilodon cucullina (Denis & Schiffermüller, 1775)
- Ptilophora plumigera (Denis & Schiffermüller, 1775)
- Stauropus fagi (Linnaeus, 1758)
- Thaumetopoea processionea (Linnaeus, 1758)

=== Oecophoridae ===
- Alabonia geoffrella (Linnaeus, 1767)
- Aplota palpella (Haworth, 1828)
- Batia lambdella (Donovan, 1793)
- Batia lunaris (Haworth, 1828)
- Bisigna procerella (Denis & Schiffermüller, 1775)
- Borkhausenia fuscescens (Haworth, 1828)
- Borkhausenia luridicomella (Herrich-Schäffer, 1856)
- Borkhausenia minutella (Linnaeus, 1758)
- Crassa tinctella (Hübner, 1796)
- Crassa unitella (Hübner, 1796)
- Dasycera oliviella (Fabricius, 1794)
- Denisia albimaculea (Haworth, 1828)
- Denisia augustella (Hübner, 1796)
- Denisia similella (Hübner, 1796)
- Denisia stipella (Linnaeus, 1758)
- Endrosis sarcitrella (Linnaeus, 1758)
- Epicallima formosella (Denis & Schiffermüller, 1775)
- Esperia sulphurella (Fabricius, 1775)
- Harpella forficella (Scopoli, 1763)
- Hofmannophila pseudospretella (Stainton, 1849)
- Metalampra cinnamomea (Zeller, 1839)
- Oecophora bractella (Linnaeus, 1758)
- Pleurota aristella (Linnaeus, 1767)
- Pleurota bicostella (Clerck, 1759)

=== Opostegidae ===
- Opostega salaciella (Treitschke, 1833)
- Pseudopostega auritella (Hübner, 1813)
- Pseudopostega crepusculella (Zeller, 1839)

=== Peleopodidae ===
- Carcina quercana (Fabricius, 1775)

=== Plutellidae ===
- Eidophasia messingiella (Fischer von Röslerstamm, 1840)
- Plutella xylostella (Linnaeus, 1758)
- Plutella porrectella (Linnaeus, 1758)
- Rhigognostis annulatella (Curtis, 1832)

=== Praydidae ===
- Atemelia torquatella (Lienig & Zeller, 1846)
- Prays fraxinella (Bjerkander, 1784)

=== Prodoxidae ===
- Lampronia capitella (Clerck, 1759)
- Lampronia corticella (Linnaeus, 1758)
- Lampronia flavimitrella (Hübner, 1817)
- Lampronia fuscatella (Tengstrom, 1848)
- Lampronia luzella (Hübner, 1817)
- Lampronia morosa Zeller, 1852

=== Psychidae ===
- Acanthopsyche atra (Linnaeus, 1767)
- Apterona helicoidella (Vallot, 1827)
- Bacotia claustrella (Bruand, 1845)
- Bankesia conspurcatella (Zeller, 1850)
- Canephora hirsuta (Poda, 1761)
- Dahlica lichenella (Linnaeus, 1761)
- Dahlica triquetrella (Hübner, 1813)
- Diplodoma laichartingella Goeze, 1783
- Epichnopterix plumella (Denis & Schiffermüller, 1775)
- Luffia ferchaultella (Stephens, 1850)
- Megalophanes viciella (Denis & Schiffermüller, 1775)
- Narycia duplicella (Goeze, 1783)
- Pachythelia villosella (Ochsenheimer, 1810)
- Phalacropterix graslinella (Boisduval, 1852)
- Proutia betulina (Zeller, 1839)
- Psyche casta (Pallas, 1767)
- Psyche crassiorella Bruand, 1851
- Ptilocephala agrostidis (Schrank, 1802)
- Ptilocephala plumifera (Ochsenheimer, 1810)
- Sterrhopterix fusca (Haworth, 1809)
- Taleporia tubulosa (Retzius, 1783)

=== Pterophoridae ===
- Adaina microdactyla (Hübner, 1813)
- Agdistis bennetii (Curtis, 1833)
- Amblyptilia acanthadactyla (Hübner, 1813)
- Buckleria paludum (Zeller, 1839)
- Buszkoiana capnodactylus (Zeller, 1841)
- Capperia britanniodactylus (Gregson, 1867)
- Capperia celeusi (Frey, 1886)
- Capperia fusca (O. Hofmann, 1898)
- Capperia loranus (Fuchs, 1895)
- Cnaemidophorus rhododactyla (Denis & Schiffermüller, 1775)
- Crombrugghia distans (Zeller, 1847)
- Emmelina monodactyla (Linnaeus, 1758)
- Gillmeria ochrodactyla (Denis & Schiffermüller, 1775)
- Gillmeria pallidactyla (Haworth, 1811)
- Hellinsia carphodactyla (Hübner, 1813)
- Hellinsia didactylites (Strom, 1783)
- Hellinsia distinctus (Herrich-Schäffer, 1855)
- Hellinsia lienigianus (Zeller, 1852)
- Hellinsia tephradactyla (Hübner, 1813)
- Marasmarcha lunaedactyla (Haworth, 1811)
- Merrifieldia baliodactylus (Zeller, 1841)
- Merrifieldia leucodactyla (Denis & Schiffermüller, 1775)
- Merrifieldia tridactyla (Linnaeus, 1758)
- Oidaematophorus lithodactyla (Treitschke, 1833)
- Oxyptilus chrysodactyla (Denis & Schiffermüller, 1775)
- Oxyptilus parvidactyla (Haworth, 1811)
- Oxyptilus pilosellae (Zeller, 1841)
- Platyptilia calodactyla (Denis & Schiffermüller, 1775)
- Platyptilia farfarellus Zeller, 1867
- Platyptilia gonodactyla (Denis & Schiffermüller, 1775)
- Platyptilia nemoralis Zeller, 1841
- Pselnophorus heterodactyla (Muller, 1764)
- Pterophorus pentadactyla (Linnaeus, 1758)
- Stenoptilia aridus (Zeller, 1847)
- Stenoptilia bipunctidactyla (Scopoli, 1763)
- Stenoptilia graphodactyla (Treitschke, 1833)
- Stenoptilia pelidnodactyla (Stein, 1837)
- Stenoptilia pneumonanthes (Buttner, 1880)
- Stenoptilia pterodactyla (Linnaeus, 1761)
- Stenoptilia stigmatodactylus (Zeller, 1852)
- Stenoptilia zophodactylus (Duponchel, 1840)
- Wheeleria spilodactylus (Curtis, 1827)

=== Pyralidae ===
- Achroia grisella (Fabricius, 1794)
- Acrobasis advenella (Zincken, 1818)
- Acrobasis consociella (Hübner, 1813)
- Acrobasis marmorea (Haworth, 1811)
- Acrobasis obtusella (Hübner, 1796)
- Acrobasis repandana (Fabricius, 1798)
- Acrobasis sodalella Zeller, 1848
- Acrobasis suavella (Zincken, 1818)
- Acrobasis tumidana (Denis & Schiffermüller, 1775)
- Aglossa caprealis (Hübner, 1809)
- Aglossa pinguinalis (Linnaeus, 1758)
- Ancylosis cinnamomella (Duponchel, 1836)
- Ancylosis oblitella (Zeller, 1848)
- Anerastia lotella (Hübner, 1813)
- Aphomia sociella (Linnaeus, 1758)
- Aphomia zelleri de Joannis, 1932
- Apomyelois ceratoniae (Zeller, 1839)
- Assara terebrella (Zincken, 1818)
- Cadra cautella (Walker, 1863)
- Cadra figulilella (Gregson, 1871)
- Corcyra cephalonica (Stainton, 1866)
- Cryptoblabes bistriga (Haworth, 1811)
- Delplanqueia dilutella (Denis & Schiffermüller, 1775)
- Dioryctria abietella (Denis & Schiffermüller, 1775)
- Dioryctria schuetzeella Fuchs, 1899
- Dioryctria simplicella Heinemann, 1863
- Dioryctria sylvestrella (Ratzeburg, 1840)
- Eccopisa effractella Zeller, 1848
- Elegia similella (Zincken, 1818)
- Ematheudes punctella (Treitschke, 1833)
- Endotricha flammealis (Denis & Schiffermüller, 1775)
- Ephestia elutella (Hübner, 1796)
- Ephestia kuehniella Zeller, 1879
- Ephestia parasitella Staudinger, 1859
- Epischnia prodromella (Hübner, 1799)
- Eurhodope cirrigerella (Zincken, 1818)
- Eurhodope rosella (Scopoli, 1763)
- Euzophera bigella (Zeller, 1848)
- Euzophera fuliginosella (Heinemann, 1865)
- Euzophera pinguis (Haworth, 1811)
- Galleria mellonella (Linnaeus, 1758)
- Glyptoteles leucacrinella Zeller, 1848
- Gymnancyla canella (Denis & Schiffermüller, 1775)
- Homoeosoma nebulella (Denis & Schiffermüller, 1775)
- Hypochalcia ahenella (Denis & Schiffermüller, 1775)
- Hypochalcia lignella (Hübner, 1796)
- Hypsopygia costalis (Fabricius, 1775)
- Hypsopygia glaucinalis (Linnaeus, 1758)
- Khorassania compositella (Treitschke, 1835)
- Lamoria anella (Denis & Schiffermüller, 1775)
- Matilella fusca (Haworth, 1811)
- Moitrelia obductella (Zeller, 1839)
- Myelois circumvoluta (Fourcroy, 1785)
- Nephopterix angustella (Hübner, 1796)
- Nyctegretis lineana (Scopoli, 1786)
- Oncocera semirubella (Scopoli, 1763)
- Ortholepis betulae (Goeze, 1778)
- Paralipsa gularis (Zeller, 1877)
- Pempelia palumbella (Denis & Schiffermüller, 1775)
- Pempeliella ornatella (Denis & Schiffermüller, 1775)
- Phycita roborella (Denis & Schiffermüller, 1775)
- Phycitodes albatella (Ragonot, 1887)
- Phycitodes binaevella (Hübner, 1813)
- Phycitodes inquinatella (Ragonot, 1887)
- Phycitodes maritima (Tengstrom, 1848)
- Phycitodes saxicola (Vaughan, 1870)
- Pima boisduvaliella (Guenee, 1845)
- Plodia interpunctella (Hübner, 1813)
- Pyralis farinalis (Linnaeus, 1758)
- Rhodophaea formosa (Haworth, 1811)
- Salebriopsis albicilla (Herrich-Schäffer, 1849)
- Sciota adelphella (Fischer v. Röslerstamm, 1836)
- Sciota hostilis (Stephens, 1834)
- Sciota rhenella (Zincken, 1818)
- Selagia argyrella (Denis & Schiffermüller, 1775)
- Selagia spadicella (Hübner, 1796)
- Synaphe punctalis (Fabricius, 1775)
- Vitula biviella (Zeller, 1848)
- Zophodia grossulariella (Hübner, 1809)

=== Roeslerstammiidae ===
- Roeslerstammia erxlebella (Fabricius, 1787)

=== Saturniidae ===
- Aglia tau (Linnaeus, 1758)
- Saturnia pavonia (Linnaeus, 1758)
- Saturnia pyri (Denis & Schiffermüller, 1775)

=== Schreckensteiniidae ===
- Schreckensteinia festaliella (Hübner, 1819)

=== Scythrididae ===
- Scythris dissimilella (Herrich-Schäffer, 1855)
- Scythris empetrella Karsholt & Nielsen, 1976
- Scythris ericetella (Heinemann, 1872)
- Scythris ericivorella (Ragonot, 1880)
- Scythris fuscoaenea (Haworth, 1828)
- Scythris inspersella (Hübner, 1817)
- Scythris knochella (Fabricius, 1794)
- Scythris laminella (Denis & Schiffermüller, 1775)
- Scythris limbella (Fabricius, 1775)
- Scythris noricella (Zeller, 1843)
- Scythris picaepennis (Haworth, 1828)
- Scythris scopolella (Linnaeus, 1767)
- Scythris tributella (Zeller, 1847)

=== Sesiidae ===
- Bembecia ichneumoniformis (Denis & Schiffermüller, 1775)
- Chamaesphecia empiformis (Esper, 1783)
- Chamaesphecia tenthrediniformis (Denis & Schiffermüller, 1775)
- Paranthrene tabaniformis (Rottemburg, 1775)
- Pennisetia hylaeiformis (Laspeyres, 1801)
- Pyropteron affinis (Staudinger, 1856)
- Pyropteron chrysidiformis (Esper, 1782)
- Sesia apiformis (Clerck, 1759)
- Sesia bembeciformis (Hübner, 1806)
- Sesia melanocephala Dalman, 1816
- Synanthedon andrenaeformis (Laspeyres, 1801)
- Synanthedon conopiformis (Esper, 1782)
- Synanthedon culiciformis (Linnaeus, 1758)
- Synanthedon flaviventris (Staudinger, 1883)
- Synanthedon formicaeformis (Esper, 1783)
- Synanthedon myopaeformis (Borkhausen, 1789)
- Synanthedon scoliaeformis (Borkhausen, 1789)
- Synanthedon spheciformis (Denis & Schiffermüller, 1775)
- Synanthedon tipuliformis (Clerck, 1759)
- Synanthedon vespiformis (Linnaeus, 1761)

=== Sphingidae ===
- Acherontia atropos (Linnaeus, 1758)
- Agrius convolvuli (Linnaeus, 1758)
- Daphnis nerii (Linnaeus, 1758)
- Deilephila elpenor (Linnaeus, 1758)
- Deilephila porcellus (Linnaeus, 1758)
- Hemaris fuciformis (Linnaeus, 1758)
- Hemaris tityus (Linnaeus, 1758)
- Hippotion celerio (Linnaeus, 1758)
- Hyles euphorbiae (Linnaeus, 1758)
- Hyles gallii (Rottemburg, 1775)
- Hyles livornica (Esper, 1780)
- Laothoe populi (Linnaeus, 1758)
- Macroglossum stellatarum (Linnaeus, 1758)
- Mimas tiliae (Linnaeus, 1758)
- Proserpinus proserpina (Pallas, 1772)
- Smerinthus ocellata (Linnaeus, 1758)
- Sphinx ligustri Linnaeus, 1758
- Sphinx pinastri Linnaeus, 1758

=== Stathmopodidae ===
- Stathmopoda pedella (Linnaeus, 1761)

=== Thyrididae ===
- Thyris fenestrella (Scopoli, 1763)

=== Tineidae ===
- Cephimallota crassiflavella Bruand, 1851
- Eudarcia pagenstecherella (Hübner, 1825)
- Euplocamus anthracinalis (Scopoli, 1763)
- Haplotinea ditella (Pierce & Metcalfe, 1938)
- Haplotinea insectella (Fabricius, 1794)
- Infurcitinea argentimaculella (Stainton, 1849)
- Lichenotinea pustulatella (Zeller, 1852)
- Monopis crocicapitella (Clemens, 1859)
- Monopis fenestratella (Heyden, 1863)
- Monopis imella (Hübner, 1813)
- Monopis laevigella (Denis & Schiffermüller, 1775)
- Monopis monachella (Hübner, 1796)
- Monopis obviella (Denis & Schiffermüller, 1775)
- Monopis weaverella (Scott, 1858)
- Morophaga choragella (Denis & Schiffermüller, 1775)
- Nemapogon clematella (Fabricius, 1781)
- Nemapogon cloacella (Haworth, 1828)
- Nemapogon granella (Linnaeus, 1758)
- Nemapogon variatella (Clemens, 1859)
- Nemaxera betulinella (Fabricius, 1787)
- Niditinea fuscella (Linnaeus, 1758)
- Niditinea striolella (Matsumura, 1931)
- Oinophila v-flava (Haworth, 1828)
- Opogona sacchari (Bojer, 1856)
- Psychoides verhuella Bruand, 1853
- Stenoptinea cyaneimarmorella (Milliere, 1854)
- Tinea columbariella Wocke, 1877
- Tinea pallescentella Stainton, 1851
- Tinea pellionella Linnaeus, 1758
- Tinea semifulvella Haworth, 1828
- Tinea trinotella Thunberg, 1794
- Tineola bisselliella (Hummel, 1823)
- Triaxomera fulvimitrella (Sodoffsky, 1830)
- Triaxomera parasitella (Hübner, 1796)
- Trichophaga tapetzella (Linnaeus, 1758)

=== Tischeriidae ===
- Coptotriche angusticollella (Duponchel, 1843)
- Coptotriche gaunacella (Duponchel, 1843)
- Coptotriche heinemanni (Wocke, 1871)
- Coptotriche marginea (Haworth, 1828)
- Tischeria dodonaea Stainton, 1858
- Tischeria ekebladella (Bjerkander, 1795)

=== Tortricidae ===
- Acleris abietana (Hübner, 1822)
- Acleris aspersana (Hübner, 1817)
- Acleris bergmanniana (Linnaeus, 1758)
- Acleris comariana (Lienig & Zeller, 1846)
- Acleris cristana (Denis & Schiffermüller, 1775)
- Acleris emargana (Fabricius, 1775)
- Acleris ferrugana (Denis & Schiffermüller, 1775)
- Acleris forsskaleana (Linnaeus, 1758)
- Acleris hastiana (Linnaeus, 1758)
- Acleris hippophaeana (Heyden, 1865)
- Acleris holmiana (Linnaeus, 1758)
- Acleris hyemana (Haworth, 1811)
- Acleris kochiella (Goeze, 1783)
- Acleris laterana (Fabricius, 1794)
- Acleris lipsiana (Denis & Schiffermüller, 1775)
- Acleris literana (Linnaeus, 1758)
- Acleris logiana (Clerck, 1759)
- Acleris lorquiniana (Duponchel, 1835)
- Acleris notana (Donovan, 1806)
- Acleris permutana (Duponchel, 1836)
- Acleris quercinana (Zeller, 1849)
- Acleris rhombana (Denis & Schiffermüller, 1775)
- Acleris rufana (Denis & Schiffermüller, 1775)
- Acleris scabrana (Denis & Schiffermüller, 1775)
- Acleris schalleriana (Linnaeus, 1761)
- Acleris shepherdana (Stephens, 1852)
- Acleris sparsana (Denis & Schiffermüller, 1775)
- Acleris umbrana (Hübner, 1799)
- Acleris variegana (Denis & Schiffermüller, 1775)
- Adoxophyes orana (Fischer v. Röslerstamm, 1834)
- Aethes cnicana (Westwood, 1854)
- Aethes francillana (Fabricius, 1794)
- Aethes hartmanniana (Clerck, 1759)
- Aethes margaritana (Haworth, 1811)
- Aethes piercei Obraztsov, 1952
- Aethes rubigana (Treitschke, 1830)
- Aethes rutilana (Hübner, 1817)
- Aethes smeathmanniana (Fabricius, 1781)
- Aethes tesserana (Denis & Schiffermüller, 1775)
- Aethes triangulana (Treitschke, 1835)
- Aethes williana (Brahm, 1791)
- Agapeta hamana (Linnaeus, 1758)
- Agapeta zoegana (Linnaeus, 1767)
- Aleimma loeflingiana (Linnaeus, 1758)
- Ancylis achatana (Denis & Schiffermüller, 1775)
- Ancylis apicella (Denis & Schiffermüller, 1775)
- Ancylis badiana (Denis & Schiffermüller, 1775)
- Ancylis comptana (Frolich, 1828)
- Ancylis diminutana (Haworth, 1811)
- Ancylis geminana (Donovan, 1806)
- Ancylis laetana (Fabricius, 1775)
- Ancylis mitterbacheriana (Denis & Schiffermüller, 1775)
- Ancylis myrtillana (Treitschke, 1830)
- Ancylis obtusana (Haworth, 1811)
- Ancylis paludana Barrett, 1871
- Ancylis tineana (Hübner, 1799)
- Ancylis uncella (Denis & Schiffermüller, 1775)
- Ancylis unculana (Haworth, 1811)
- Ancylis unguicella (Linnaeus, 1758)
- Ancylis upupana (Treitschke, 1835)
- Aphelia viburniana (Denis & Schiffermüller, 1775)
- Aphelia paleana (Hübner, 1793)
- Aphelia unitana (Hübner, 1799)
- Apotomis betuletana (Haworth, 1811)
- Apotomis capreana (Hübner, 1817)
- Apotomis inundana (Denis & Schiffermüller, 1775)
- Apotomis lineana (Denis & Schiffermüller, 1775)
- Apotomis sauciana (Frolich, 1828)
- Apotomis semifasciana (Haworth, 1811)
- Apotomis sororculana (Zetterstedt, 1839)
- Apotomis turbidana Hübner, 1825
- Archips betulana (Hübner, 1787)
- Archips crataegana (Hübner, 1799)
- Archips oporana (Linnaeus, 1758)
- Archips podana (Scopoli, 1763)
- Archips rosana (Linnaeus, 1758)
- Archips xylosteana (Linnaeus, 1758)
- Argyrotaenia ljungiana (Thunberg, 1797)
- Bactra lacteana Caradja, 1916
- Bactra lancealana (Hübner, 1799)
- Bactra robustana (Christoph, 1872)
- Bactra suedana Bengtsson, 1989
- Cacoecimorpha pronubana (Hübner, 1799)
- Capua vulgana (Frolich, 1828)
- Celypha aurofasciana (Haworth, 1811)
- Celypha cespitana (Hübner, 1817)
- Celypha lacunana (Denis & Schiffermüller, 1775)
- Celypha rivulana (Scopoli, 1763)
- Celypha rosaceana Schlager, 1847
- Celypha rufana (Scopoli, 1763)
- Celypha rurestrana (Duponchel, 1843)
- Celypha striana (Denis & Schiffermüller, 1775)
- Celypha woodiana (Barrett, 1882)
- Choristoneura diversana (Hübner, 1817)
- Choristoneura hebenstreitella (Muller, 1764)
- Choristoneura lafauryana (Ragonot, 1875)
- Choristoneura murinana (Hübner, 1799)
- Clavigesta purdeyi (Durrant, 1911)
- Clavigesta sylvestrana (Curtis, 1850)
- Clepsis consimilana (Hübner, 1817)
- Clepsis dumicolana (Zeller, 1847)
- Clepsis pallidana (Fabricius, 1776)
- Clepsis rurinana (Linnaeus, 1758)
- Clepsis senecionana (Hübner, 1819)
- Clepsis spectrana (Treitschke, 1830)
- Cnephasia asseclana (Denis & Schiffermüller, 1775)
- Cnephasia communana (Herrich-Schäffer, 1851)
- Cnephasia cupressivorana (Staudinger, 1871)
- Cnephasia genitalana Pierce & Metcalfe, 1922
- Cnephasia longana (Haworth, 1811)
- Cnephasia pasiuana (Hübner, 1799)
- Cnephasia stephensiana (Doubleday, 1849)
- Cnephasia incertana (Treitschke, 1835)
- Cochylidia heydeniana (Herrich-Schäffer, 1851)
- Cochylidia implicitana (Wocke, 1856)
- Cochylidia rupicola (Curtis, 1834)
- Cochylimorpha straminea (Haworth, 1811)
- Cochylis atricapitana (Stephens, 1852)
- Cochylis dubitana (Hübner, 1799)
- Cochylis flaviciliana (Westwood, 1854)
- Cochylis hybridella (Hübner, 1813)
- Cochylis nana (Haworth, 1811)
- Cochylis posterana Zeller, 1847
- Cochylis roseana (Haworth, 1811)
- Commophila aeneana (Hübner, 1800)
- Crocidosema plebejana Zeller, 1847
- Cydia amplana (Hübner, 1800)
- Cydia conicolana (Heylaerts, 1874)
- Cydia coniferana (Saxesen, 1840)
- Cydia cosmophorana (Treitschke, 1835)
- Cydia duplicana (Zetterstedt, 1839)
- Cydia fagiglandana (Zeller, 1841)
- Cydia inquinatana (Hübner, 1800)
- Cydia interscindana (Moschler, 1866)
- Cydia microgrammana (Guenee, 1845)
- Cydia millenniana (Adamczewski, 1967)
- Cydia nigricana (Fabricius, 1794)
- Cydia pactolana (Zeller, 1840)
- Cydia pomonella (Linnaeus, 1758)
- Cydia servillana (Duponchel, 1836)
- Cydia splendana (Hübner, 1799)
- Cydia strobilella (Linnaeus, 1758)
- Cydia succedana (Denis & Schiffermüller, 1775)
- Cymolomia hartigiana (Saxesen, 1840)
- Diceratura ostrinana (Guenee, 1845)
- Dichelia histrionana (Frolich, 1828)
- Dichrorampha acuminatana (Lienig & Zeller, 1846)
- Dichrorampha aeratana (Pierce & Metcalfe, 1915)
- Dichrorampha agilana (Tengstrom, 1848)
- Dichrorampha alpinana (Treitschke, 1830)
- Dichrorampha flavidorsana Knaggs, 1867
- Dichrorampha gruneriana (Herrich-Schäffer, 1851)
- Dichrorampha montanana (Duponchel, 1843)
- Dichrorampha obscuratana (Wolff, 1955)
- Dichrorampha petiverella (Linnaeus, 1758)
- Dichrorampha plumbagana (Treitschke, 1830)
- Dichrorampha plumbana (Scopoli, 1763)
- Dichrorampha sedatana Busck, 1906
- Dichrorampha sequana (Hübner, 1799)
- Dichrorampha simpliciana (Haworth, 1811)
- Dichrorampha vancouverana McDunnough, 1935
- Ditula angustiorana (Haworth, 1811)
- Doloploca punctulana (Denis & Schiffermüller, 1775)
- Eana incanana (Stephens, 1852)
- Eana argentana (Clerck, 1759)
- Eana osseana (Scopoli, 1763)
- Enarmonia formosana (Scopoli, 1763)
- Endothenia ericetana (Humphreys & Westwood, 1845)
- Endothenia gentianaeana (Hübner, 1799)
- Endothenia marginana (Haworth, 1811)
- Endothenia nigricostana (Haworth, 1811)
- Endothenia pullana (Haworth, 1811)
- Endothenia quadrimaculana (Haworth, 1811)
- Endothenia ustulana (Haworth, 1811)
- Epagoge grotiana (Fabricius, 1781)
- Epiblema costipunctana (Haworth, 1811)
- Epiblema foenella (Linnaeus, 1758)
- Epiblema grandaevana (Lienig & Zeller, 1846)
- Epiblema graphana (Treitschke, 1835)
- Epiblema hepaticana (Treitschke, 1835)
- Epiblema scutulana (Denis & Schiffermüller, 1775)
- Epiblema similana (Denis & Schiffermüller, 1775)
- Epiblema sticticana (Fabricius, 1794)
- Epiblema turbidana (Treitschke, 1835)
- Epinotia abbreviana (Fabricius, 1794)
- Epinotia bilunana (Haworth, 1811)
- Epinotia brunnichana (Linnaeus, 1767)
- Epinotia caprana (Fabricius, 1798)
- Epinotia crenana (Hübner, 1799)
- Epinotia cruciana (Linnaeus, 1761)
- Epinotia demarniana (Fischer v. Röslerstamm, 1840)
- Epinotia fraternana (Haworth, 1811)
- Epinotia granitana (Herrich-Schäffer, 1851)
- Epinotia immundana (Fischer v. Röslerstamm, 1839)
- Epinotia maculana (Fabricius, 1775)
- Epinotia nanana (Treitschke, 1835)
- Epinotia nigricana (Herrich-Schäffer, 1851)
- Epinotia nisella (Clerck, 1759)
- Epinotia pygmaeana (Hübner, 1799)
- Epinotia ramella (Linnaeus, 1758)
- Epinotia rubiginosana (Herrich-Schäffer, 1851)
- Epinotia signatana (Douglas, 1845)
- Epinotia solandriana (Linnaeus, 1758)
- Epinotia sordidana (Hübner, 1824)
- Epinotia subocellana (Donovan, 1806)
- Epinotia subsequana (Haworth, 1811)
- Epinotia tedella (Clerck, 1759)
- Epinotia tenerana (Denis & Schiffermüller, 1775)
- Epinotia tetraquetrana (Haworth, 1811)
- Epinotia trigonella (Linnaeus, 1758)
- Eriopsela quadrana (Hübner, 1813)
- Eucosma aemulana (Schlager, 1849)
- Eucosma aspidiscana (Hübner, 1817)
- Eucosma campoliliana (Denis & Schiffermüller, 1775)
- Eucosma cana (Haworth, 1811)
- Eucosma conterminana (Guenee, 1845)
- Eucosma hohenwartiana (Denis & Schiffermüller, 1775)
- Eucosma lacteana (Treitschke, 1835)
- Eucosma metzneriana (Treitschke, 1830)
- Eucosma obumbratana (Lienig & Zeller, 1846)
- Eucosma pupillana (Clerck, 1759)
- Eucosma tripoliana (Barrett, 1880)
- Eucosmomorpha albersana (Hübner, 1813)
- Eudemis porphyrana (Hübner, 1799)
- Eudemis profundana (Denis & Schiffermüller, 1775)
- Eulia ministrana (Linnaeus, 1758)
- Eupoecilia ambiguella (Hübner, 1796)
- Eupoecilia angustana (Hübner, 1799)
- Exapate congelatella (Clerck, 1759)
- Falseuncaria degreyana (McLachlan, 1869)
- Falseuncaria ruficiliana (Haworth, 1811)
- Gibberifera simplana (Fischer v. Röslerstamm, 1836)
- Grapholita funebrana Treitschke, 1835
- Grapholita janthinana (Duponchel, 1843)
- Grapholita molesta (Busck, 1916)
- Grapholita tenebrosana Duponchel, 1843
- Grapholita caecana Schlager, 1847
- Grapholita compositella (Fabricius, 1775)
- Grapholita coronillana Lienig & Zeller, 1846
- Grapholita difficilana (Walsingham, 1900)
- Grapholita discretana Wocke, 1861
- Grapholita gemmiferana Treitschke, 1835
- Grapholita internana (Guenee, 1845)
- Grapholita jungiella (Clerck, 1759)
- Grapholita lathyrana (Hübner, 1822)
- Grapholita lunulana (Denis & Schiffermüller, 1775)
- Grapholita nebritana Treitschke, 1830
- Grapholita orobana Treitschke, 1830
- Gravitarmata margarotana (Heinemann, 1863)
- Gynnidomorpha alismana (Ragonot, 1883)
- Gynnidomorpha luridana (Gregson, 1870)
- Gynnidomorpha permixtana (Denis & Schiffermüller, 1775)
- Gynnidomorpha vectisana (Humphreys & Westwood, 1845)
- Gypsonoma aceriana (Duponchel, 1843)
- Gypsonoma dealbana (Frolich, 1828)
- Gypsonoma minutana (Hübner, 1799)
- Gypsonoma nitidulana (Lienig & Zeller, 1846)
- Gypsonoma oppressana (Treitschke, 1835)
- Gypsonoma sociana (Haworth, 1811)
- Hedya nubiferana (Haworth, 1811)
- Hedya ochroleucana (Frolich, 1828)
- Hedya pruniana (Hübner, 1799)
- Hedya salicella (Linnaeus, 1758)
- Hysterophora maculosana (Haworth, 1811)
- Isotrias rectifasciana (Haworth, 1811)
- Lathronympha strigana (Fabricius, 1775)
- Lobesia abscisana (Doubleday, 1849)
- Lobesia botrana (Denis & Schiffermüller, 1775)
- Lobesia littoralis (Westwood & Humphreys, 1845)
- Lobesia reliquana (Hübner, 1825)
- Lozotaenia forsterana (Fabricius, 1781)
- Lozotaeniodes formosana (Frolich, 1830)
- Metendothenia atropunctana (Zetterstedt, 1839)
- Neosphaleroptera nubilana (Hübner, 1799)
- Notocelia cynosbatella (Linnaeus, 1758)
- Notocelia incarnatana (Hübner, 1800)
- Notocelia roborana (Denis & Schiffermüller, 1775)
- Notocelia rosaecolana (Doubleday, 1850)
- Notocelia tetragonana (Stephens, 1834)
- Notocelia trimaculana (Haworth, 1811)
- Notocelia uddmanniana (Linnaeus, 1758)
- Olethreutes arcuella (Clerck, 1759)
- Olindia schumacherana (Fabricius, 1787)
- Orthotaenia undulana (Denis & Schiffermüller, 1775)
- Pammene albuginana (Guenee, 1845)
- Pammene amygdalana (Duponchel, 1842)
- Pammene argyrana (Hübner, 1799)
- Pammene aurana (Fabricius, 1775)
- Pammene aurita Razowski, 1991
- Pammene fasciana (Linnaeus, 1761)
- Pammene gallicana (Guenee, 1845)
- Pammene gallicolana (Lienig & Zeller, 1846)
- Pammene germmana (Hübner, 1799)
- Pammene giganteana (Peyerimhoff, 1863)
- Pammene ignorata Kuznetsov, 1968
- Pammene insulana (Guenee, 1845)
- Pammene obscurana (Stephens, 1834)
- Pammene ochsenheimeriana (Lienig & Zeller, 1846)
- Pammene populana (Fabricius, 1787)
- Pammene regiana (Zeller, 1849)
- Pammene rhediella (Clerck, 1759)
- Pammene spiniana (Duponchel, 1843)
- Pammene splendidulana (Guenee, 1845)
- Pammene trauniana (Denis & Schiffermüller, 1775)
- Pandemis cerasana (Hübner, 1786)
- Pandemis cinnamomeana (Treitschke, 1830)
- Pandemis corylana (Fabricius, 1794)
- Pandemis dumetana (Treitschke, 1835)
- Pandemis heparana (Denis & Schiffermüller, 1775)
- Paramesia gnomana (Clerck, 1759)
- Pelochrista caecimaculana (Hübner, 1799)
- Periclepsis cinctana (Denis & Schiffermüller, 1775)
- Phalonidia affinitana (Douglas, 1846)
- Phalonidia curvistrigana (Stainton, 1859)
- Phalonidia manniana (Fischer v. Röslerstamm, 1839)
- Phaneta pauperana (Duponchel, 1843)
- Phiaris bipunctana (Fabricius, 1794)
- Phiaris metallicana (Hübner, 1799)
- Phiaris micana (Denis & Schiffermüller, 1775)
- Phiaris palustrana (Lienig & Zeller, 1846)
- Phiaris schulziana (Fabricius, 1776)
- Phiaris turfosana (Herrich-Schäffer, 1851)
- Phiaris umbrosana (Freyer, 1842)
- Philedone gerningana (Denis & Schiffermüller, 1775)
- Philedonides lunana (Thunberg, 1784)
- Phtheochroa inopiana (Haworth, 1811)
- Phtheochroa rugosana (Hübner, 1799)
- Phtheochroa schreibersiana (Frolich, 1828)
- Phtheochroa sodaliana (Haworth, 1811)
- Piniphila bifasciana (Haworth, 1811)
- Pristerognatha fuligana (Denis & Schiffermüller, 1775)
- Pristerognatha penthinana (Guenee, 1845)
- Pseudargyrotoza conwagana (Fabricius, 1775)
- Pseudococcyx posticana (Zetterstedt, 1839)
- Pseudococcyx turionella (Linnaeus, 1758)
- Pseudohermenias abietana (Fabricius, 1787)
- Pseudosciaphila branderiana (Linnaeus, 1758)
- Ptycholoma lecheana (Linnaeus, 1758)
- Ptycholomoides aeriferana (Herrich-Schäffer, 1851)
- Retinia resinella (Linnaeus, 1758)
- Rhopobota myrtillana (Humphreys & Westwood, 1845)
- Rhopobota naevana (Hübner, 1817)
- Rhopobota stagnana (Denis & Schiffermüller, 1775)
- Rhopobota ustomaculana (Curtis, 1831)
- Rhyacionia buoliana (Denis & Schiffermüller, 1775)
- Rhyacionia duplana (Hübner, 1813)
- Rhyacionia pinicolana (Doubleday, 1849)
- Rhyacionia pinivorana (Lienig & Zeller, 1846)
- Sparganothis pilleriana (Denis & Schiffermüller, 1775)
- Spatalistis bifasciana (Hübner, 1787)
- Spilonota laricana (Heinemann, 1863)
- Spilonota ocellana (Denis & Schiffermüller, 1775)
- Stictea mygindiana (Denis & Schiffermüller, 1775)
- Strophedra nitidana (Fabricius, 1794)
- Strophedra weirana (Douglas, 1850)
- Syndemis musculana (Hübner, 1799)
- Thiodia citrana (Hübner, 1799)
- Tortricodes alternella (Denis & Schiffermüller, 1775)
- Tortrix viridana Linnaeus, 1758
- Zeiraphera griseana (Hübner, 1799)
- Zeiraphera isertana (Fabricius, 1794)
- Zeiraphera ratzeburgiana (Saxesen, 1840)
- Zeiraphera rufimitrana (Herrich-Schäffer, 1851)

=== Yponomeutidae ===
- Cedestis gysseleniella Zeller, 1839
- Cedestis subfasciella (Stephens, 1834)
- Euhyponomeutoides ribesiella (de Joannis, 1900)
- Ocnerostoma friesei Svensson, 1966
- Ocnerostoma piniariella Zeller, 1847
- Paraswammerdamia albicapitella (Scharfenberg, 1805)
- Paraswammerdamia nebulella (Goeze, 1783)
- Pseudoswammerdamia combinella (Hübner, 1786)
- Scythropia crataegella (Linnaeus, 1767)
- Swammerdamia caesiella (Hübner, 1796)
- Swammerdamia compunctella Herrich-Schäffer, 1855
- Swammerdamia pyrella (Villers, 1789)
- Yponomeuta cagnagella (Hübner, 1813)
- Yponomeuta evonymella (Linnaeus, 1758)
- Yponomeuta malinellus Zeller, 1838
- Yponomeuta padella (Linnaeus, 1758)
- Yponomeuta plumbella (Denis & Schiffermüller, 1775)
- Yponomeuta rorrella (Hübner, 1796)
- Yponomeuta sedella Treitschke, 1832

=== Ypsolophidae ===
- Ochsenheimeria taurella (Denis & Schiffermüller, 1775)
- Ochsenheimeria urella Fischer von Röslerstamm, 1842
- Ochsenheimeria vacculella Fischer von Röslerstamm, 1842
- Ypsolopha alpella (Denis & Schiffermüller, 1775)
- Ypsolopha dentella (Fabricius, 1775)
- Ypsolopha horridella (Treitschke, 1835)
- Ypsolopha lucella (Fabricius, 1775)
- Ypsolopha mucronella (Scopoli, 1763)
- Ypsolopha nemorella (Linnaeus, 1758)
- Ypsolopha parenthesella (Linnaeus, 1761)
- Ypsolopha persicella (Fabricius, 1787)
- Ypsolopha scabrella (Linnaeus, 1761)
- Ypsolopha sequella (Clerck, 1759)
- Ypsolopha sylvella (Linnaeus, 1767)
- Ypsolopha ustella (Clerck, 1759)
- Ypsolopha vittella (Linnaeus, 1758)

=== Zygaenidae ===
- Adscita geryon (Hübner, 1813)
- Adscita statices (Linnaeus, 1758)
- Jordanita globulariae (Hübner, 1793)
- Jordanita subsolana (Staudinger, 1862)
- Rhagades pruni (Denis & Schiffermüller, 1775)
- Zygaena carniolica (Scopoli, 1763)
- Zygaena purpuralis (Brunnich, 1763)
- Zygaena ephialtes (Linnaeus, 1767)
- Zygaena filipendulae (Linnaeus, 1758)
- Zygaena lonicerae (Scheven, 1777)
- Zygaena loti (Denis & Schiffermüller, 1775)
- Zygaena transalpina (Esper, 1780)
- Zygaena trifolii (Esper, 1783)
- Zygaena viciae (Denis & Schiffermüller, 1775)
