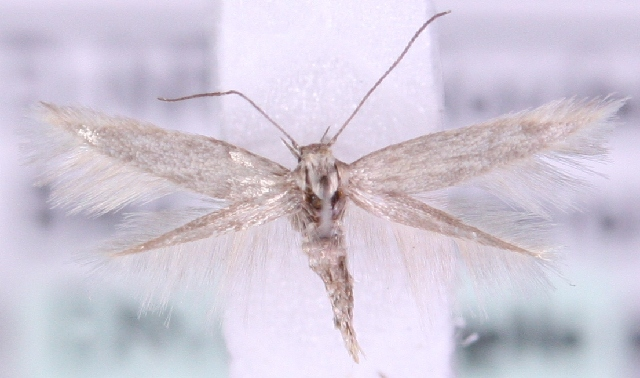

Scientific classification
- Domain: Eukaryota
- Kingdom: Animalia
- Phylum: Arthropoda
- Class: Insecta
- Order: Lepidoptera
- Family: Elachistidae
- Genus: Elachista
- Species: E. lastrella

Binomial name
- Elachista lastrella Chrétien, 1896

= Elachista lastrella =

Species of moth

Elachista lastrella is a moth of the family Elachistidae. It is found from Germany to Spain.

The wingspan is 8–9 millimetres (0.31–0.35 in).

The larvae feed on Bromus erectus. They mine the leaves of their host plant. They are yellowish with a brownish head. Larvae can be found in early spring.
