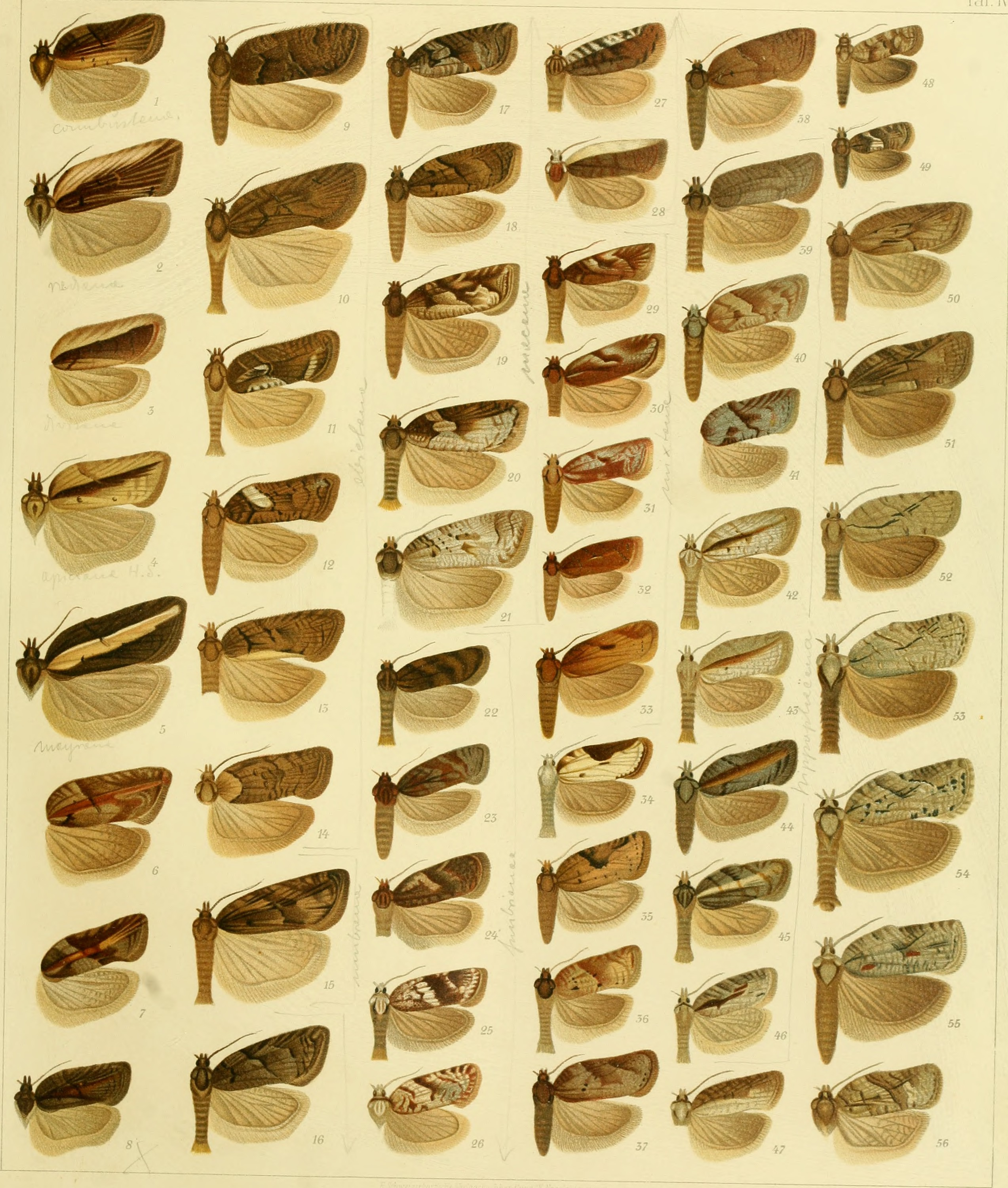
- as Acalla hippophaeana in Die palaearktischen tortriciden figs 39–44

Scientific classification
- Domain: Eukaryota
- Kingdom: Animalia
- Phylum: Arthropoda
- Class: Insecta
- Order: Lepidoptera
- Family: Tortricidae
- Genus: Acleris
- Species: A. hippophaeana

Binomial name
- Acleris hippophaeana (Heyden, 1865)

Synonyms
- Teras hippophaeana Heyden, 1865; Peronea hippophaeana ab. albodelineata Fischer, 1945; Peronea hippophaeana ab. bistriana Fischer, 1945; Teras hippophaena ab. brisiacana Reutti, 1898; Peronea hippophaeana ab. brunnea Fischer, 1945; Peronea hippophaeana ab. brunnescens Fischer, 1945; Peronea hippophaeana ab. brunnistriana Fischer, 1945; Peronea hippophaeana ab. grisea Fischer, 1945; Peronea hippophaeana ab. griseovariegata Fischer, 1945; Peronea hippophaeana ab. nigrosignana Fischer, 1945; Peronea hippophaeana ab. obscura Fischer, 1945; Teras hippophaena ab. pseudomayrana Reutti, 1898; Teras hippophaena var. ragatzana Heyden, 1865; Teras ragazana Frey, 1880; Peronea hippophaeana ab. speciosana Fischer, 1945; Peronea hippophaeana ab. subsponsana Fischer, 1945; Peronea hippophaeana ab. variegata Fischer, 1945; Peronea hippophaeana ab. variostriana Fischer, 1945

= Acleris hippophaeana =

Species of moth

Acleris hippophaeana is a species of moth of the family Tortricidae. It is found in France, Belgium, Germany, Austria, Switzerland, Italy, Slovakia, Romania, Russia and on Corsica.

The wingspan is 20–22 mm. Adults are on wing from September to April and in July.

The larvae feed on Hippophae rhamnoides. Larvae can be found in June and from August to September.
