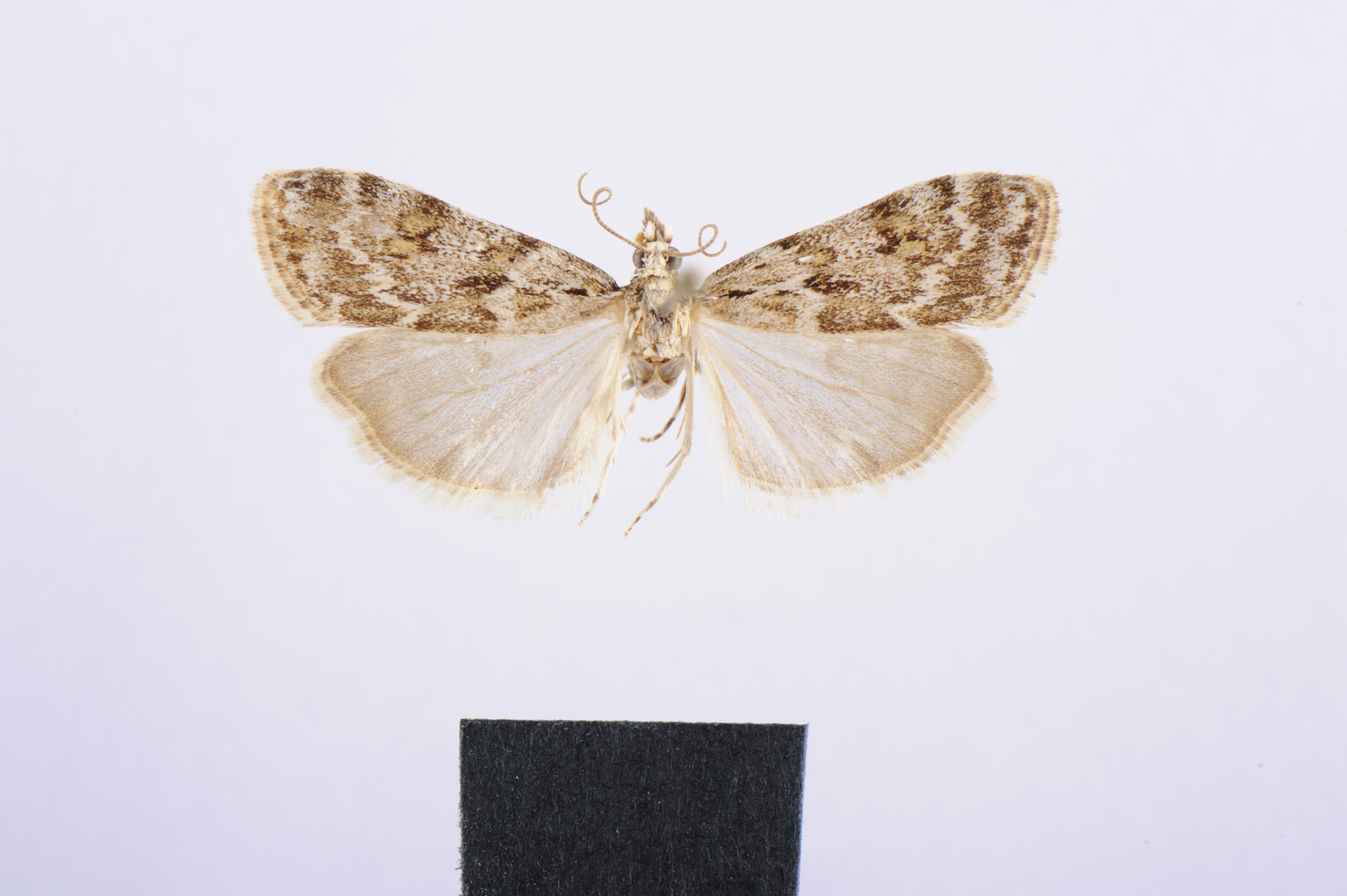

Scientific classification
- Kingdom: Animalia
- Phylum: Arthropoda
- Class: Insecta
- Order: Lepidoptera
- Family: Crambidae
- Genus: Scoparia
- Species: S. conicella

Binomial name
- Scoparia conicella (La Harpe, 1863)

Synonyms
- Eudorea conicella La Harpe, 1863; Scoparia sylvestralis Wolff, 1959

= Scoparia conicella =

Species of moth

Scoparia conicella is a species of moth in the family Crambidae. It is found in France, Belgium, Germany, Denmark, Sweden, Switzerland, Austria, Hungary and Italy.

The wingspan is 21–25 mm.
