= Scrobipalpa brahmiella =

Scientific classification
- Domain: Eukaryota
- Kingdom: Animalia
- Phylum: Arthropoda
- Class: Insecta
- Order: Lepidoptera
- Family: Gelechiidae
- Genus: Scrobipalpa
- Species: S. brahmiella

Binomial name
- Scrobipalpa brahmiella (Heyden, 1862)

Synonyms
- Gelechia brahmiella Heyden, 1862; Gnorimoschema brahmiella

Species of moth

Scrobipalpa brahmiella is a moth of the family Gelechiidae. It is found in central Europe, from France to Slovakia, further east to the Lower Volga and the southern Ural.

The larvae feed on Jurinea cyanoides, Jurinea humilis, Jurinea mollis and Serratula species. They mine the leaves of their host plant. The larvae are reddish brown. They can be found from October to April and again from July to August.
