= Scythris ericivorella =

Scientific classification
- Domain: Eukaryota
- Kingdom: Animalia
- Phylum: Arthropoda
- Class: Insecta
- Order: Lepidoptera
- Family: Scythrididae
- Genus: Scythris
- Species: S. ericivorella

Binomial name
- Scythris ericivorella Ragonot, 1880

Species of moth

Scythris ericivorella is a species of moth belonging to the family Scythrididae.

It is native to Western Europe.
