= Nola holsatica =

Scientific classification
- Domain: Eukaryota
- Kingdom: Animalia
- Phylum: Arthropoda
- Class: Insecta
- Order: Lepidoptera
- Superfamily: Noctuoidea
- Family: Nolidae
- Genus: Nola
- Species: N. holsatica

Binomial name
- Nola holsatica Sauber, 1916

Species of moth

Nola holsatica is a species of moth belonging to the family Nolidae.

It is native to Central Europe.
