= Glyphipterix heptaglyphella =

Scientific classification
- Kingdom: Animalia
- Phylum: Arthropoda
- Clade: Pancrustacea
- Class: Insecta
- Order: Lepidoptera
- Family: Glyphipterigidae
- Genus: Glyphipterix
- Species: G. heptaglyphella

Binomial name
- Glyphipterix heptaglyphella Le Marchand, 1925

Species of moth

Glyphipterix heptaglyphella is a moth of the family Glyphipterigidae. It is found in Belgium, France, Italy and on Sardinia.
