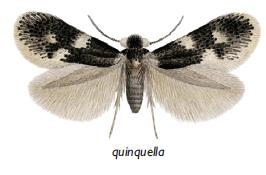

Scientific classification
- Kingdom: Animalia
- Phylum: Arthropoda
- Class: Insecta
- Order: Lepidoptera
- Family: Nepticulidae
- Genus: Ectoedemia
- Species: E. quinquella

Binomial name
- Ectoedemia quinquella (Bedell, 1848)

Synonyms
- Microsetia quinquella Bedell, 1848

= Ectoedemia quinquella =

Species of moth

Ectoedemia quinquella is a moth of the family Nepticulidae. It is found from Great Britain and France to Italy, Bulgaria and Greece.

The wingspan is 4.2-5.6 mm. Head dark fuscous. Antennal eyecaps whitish. Forewings dark bronzy-fuscous; a transverse spot on costa before middle, a triangular spot on dorsum before tornus, and a discal spot at 3/4 shining silvery white. Hindwings rather dark grey. Adults are on wing in the second half of June and early July. There is one generation per year.

The larvae feed on Quercus petraea, Quercus pubescens and Quercus robur. They mine the leaves of their host plant.

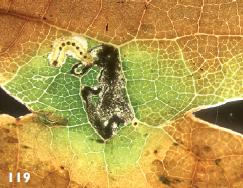
3rd instar larva on Quercus robur

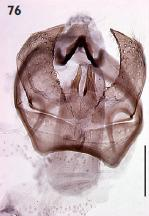
Male genitalia

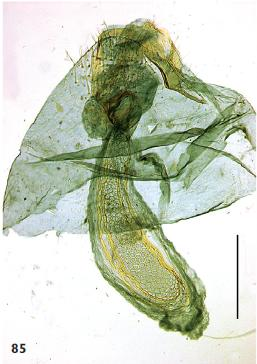
Female genitalia
