= Elachista nitidulella =

Scientific classification
- Domain: Eukaryota
- Kingdom: Animalia
- Phylum: Arthropoda
- Class: Insecta
- Order: Lepidoptera
- Family: Elachistidae
- Genus: Elachista
- Species: E. nitidulella

Binomial name
- Elachista nitidulella (Herrich-Schäffer, 1855)

Synonyms
- Poeciloptilia nitidulella Herrich-Schäffer, 1855

Species of moth

Elachista nitidulella is a moth of the family Elachistidae that can be found from Germany to the Alps and from France to Romania. It is also found in Russia.
