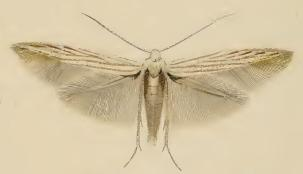

Scientific classification
- Kingdom: Animalia
- Phylum: Arthropoda
- Class: Insecta
- Order: Lepidoptera
- Family: Coleophoridae
- Genus: Coleophora
- Species: C. obscenella

Binomial name
- Coleophora obscenella Herrich-Schaffer, 1855

= Coleophora obscenella =

Species of moth

Coleophora obscenella is a moth of the family Coleophoridae. It is found from France and Belgium to Poland, the Czech Republic, Austria and Slovenia and from Germany to Italy. It has also been recorded from Romania.

Seeds of Solidago virgaurea with a larval case attached

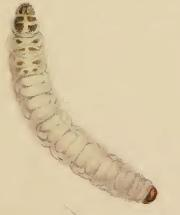
Larva

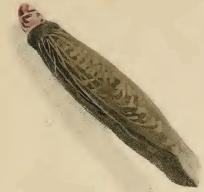
Larval case

The wingspan is 10–13 mm. Adults are on wing in June and July.

The larvae feed on Solidago virgaureae, Tripolium vulgare and Aster amellus. They feed on the flowers and fruits of their host plant.
