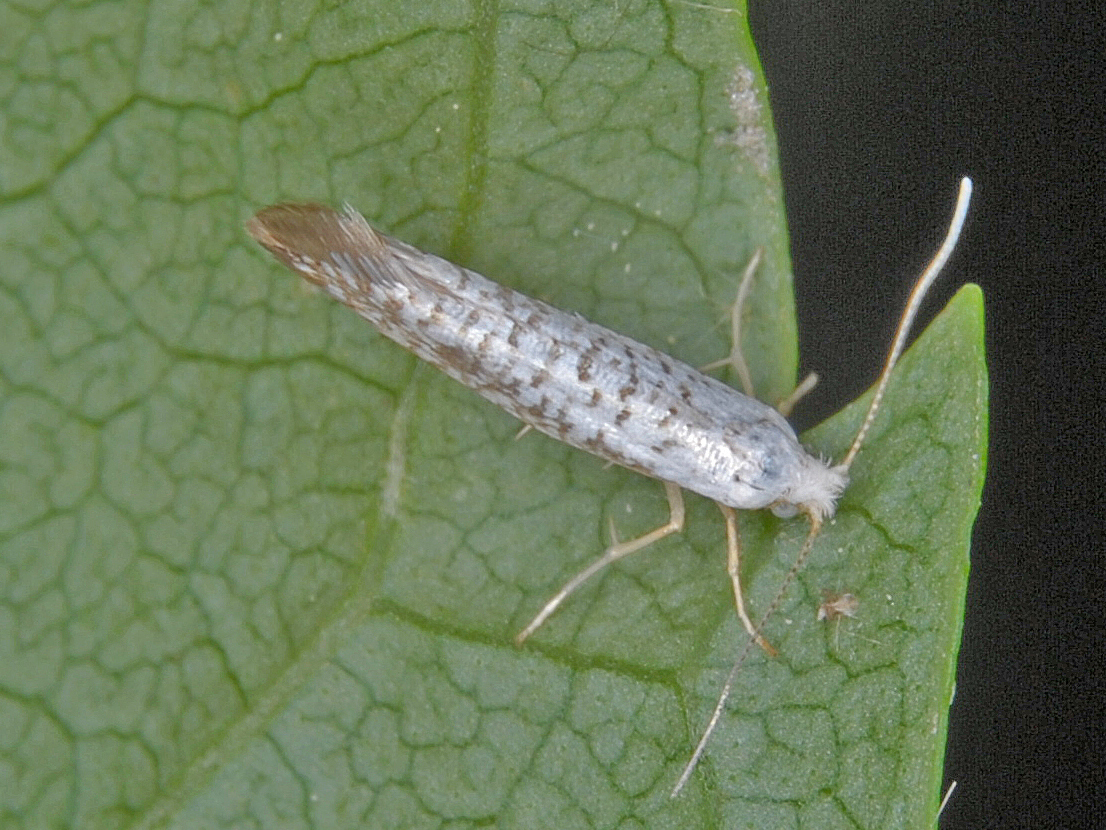
- Argyresthia retinella. Dorsal view
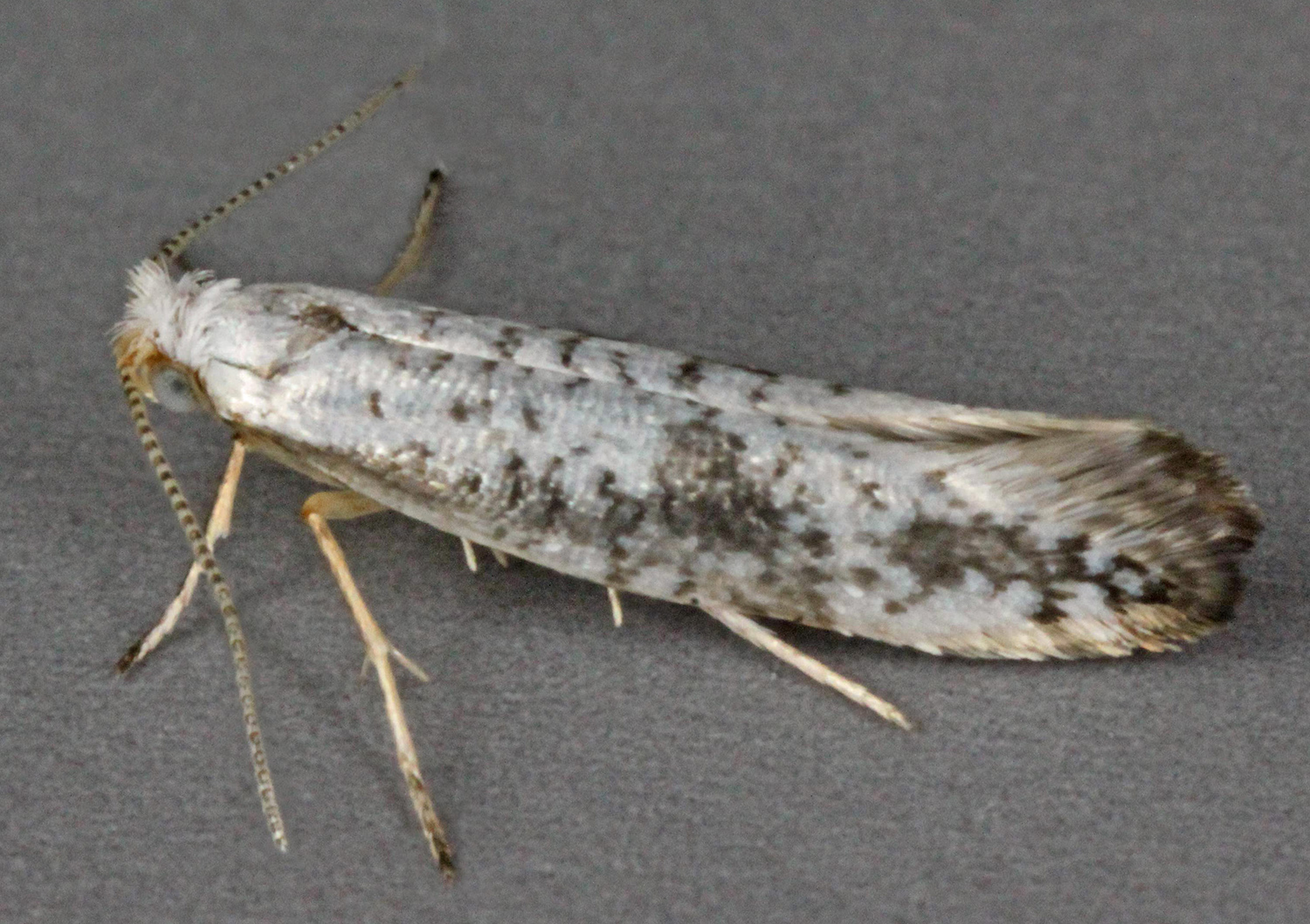
- Side view

Scientific classification
- Domain: Eukaryota
- Kingdom: Animalia
- Phylum: Arthropoda
- Class: Insecta
- Order: Lepidoptera
- Family: Argyresthiidae
- Genus: Argyresthia
- Species: A. retinella

Binomial name
- Argyresthia retinella Zeller, 1839

= Argyresthia retinella =

Species of moth

Argyresthia retinella is a species of moth of the family Yponomeutidae.

== Distribution ==
These moths can be found in Europe, across the Palearctic to Japan and Ussuri. They are very common in the British Isles compared to other moth species.

== Habitat ==
This species is present in deciduous forest environments where birch grows.

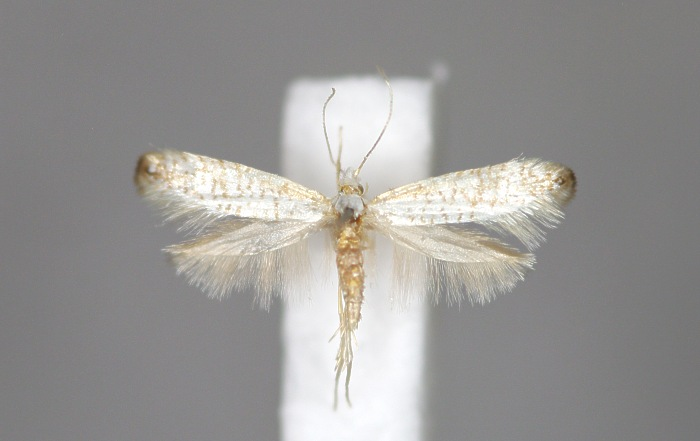
Mounted specimen

== Description ==
Argyresthia retinella has a wingspan of 9–10 mm. Forewings are white with subtle greyish or light brown markings, with a darker drawing on the wing tip. Hind wings are gray. Meyrick - Head white. Forewings shining white, irregularly strigulated with dark fuscous; an indistinct fuscous subcostal suffusion anteriorly; a suffused dark fuscous spot in middle of disc, and a larger one towards apex; a black apical dot. Hindwings grey.

This species is rather similar to Argyresthia thuiella and Argyresthia fundella.

== Biology ==
Argyresthia retinella is a univoltine species. Adults are on the wing from June to July depending on the location. Eggs of these moths were found almost exclusively on lichens. The larvae feed on the catkins and shoots of birch (Betula species).

== Bibliography ==
- Elverum, E., T.J. Johnsen & A.C. Nilssen (2003): Life history, egg cold hardiness and diapause of Argyresthia retinella (Lepidoptera: Yponomeutidae). — Norwegian Journal of Entomology 50(1): 43–53.
