= Guava moth =

Guava moth may refer to:

- Argyresthia eugeniella, found in Florida
- Coscinoptycha improbana, the Australian guava moth, found in Australia, New Caledonia and New Zealand
- Ophiusa disjungens, found in south-east Asia and the south Pacific
