= Argyresthia tatrica =

Scientific classification
- Kingdom: Animalia
- Phylum: Arthropoda
- Class: Insecta
- Order: Lepidoptera
- Family: Argyresthiidae
- Genus: Argyresthia
- Species: A. tatrica

Binomial name
- Argyresthia tatrica Baraniak, Kulfan & Patočka, 2003

Synonyms
- Argyresthia (Blastotere) tatrica

Species of moth

Argyresthia tatrica is a moth of the family Yponomeutidae. It is found in the Tatra Mountains in Slovakia.

== Ecology ==
The larvae feed on Larix decidua.
