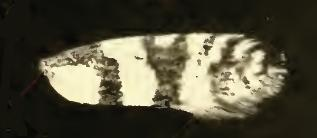
- Wing

Scientific classification
- Kingdom: Animalia
- Phylum: Arthropoda
- Clade: Pancrustacea
- Class: Insecta
- Order: Lepidoptera
- Family: Argyresthiidae
- Genus: Argyresthia
- Species: A. annettella

Binomial name
- Argyresthia annettella Busck, 1907

= Argyresthia annettella =

Species of moth

Argyresthia annettella is a moth of the family Yponomeutidae. It is found in North America, including Ohio, Ontario and Quebec.

The wingspan is about 9 mm. The forewings are silvery white with a pale golden crooked fascia from the base of the costa to the basal third of the dorsal edge. There is a broad golden fascia on the middle of the wing. There is also an irregular inwardly curved golden fascia slightly furcate at the costal edge and at the apical third. This is preceded by a golden costal streak. The hindwings are light golden fuscous.

The larvae feed on Juniperus communis. They mine the leaves of their host plant. The larvae are green. Pupation takes in an open-mesh cocoon outside the mine on the foliage.

== Etymology ==
The species is named for Annette Frances Braun, who first collected the species.
