= Argyresthia montella =

Scientific classification
- Kingdom: Animalia
- Phylum: Arthropoda
- Clade: Pancrustacea
- Class: Insecta
- Order: Lepidoptera
- Family: Argyresthiidae
- Genus: Argyresthia
- Species: A. montella

Binomial name
- Argyresthia montella Chambers, 1877

Species of moth

Argyresthia montella is a moth of the family Yponomeutidae. It is found in North America, including Colorado.

The wingspan is about 15 mm. The forewings are fuscous, the apical portion indistinctly dusted with white, and with indistinct short white streaks before the apex. The dorsal margin is white up to the fold, and very faintly dusted. The hindwings are pale greyish.

Adults have been recorded among scrub-oaks in July.
