= Argyresthia media =

Scientific classification
- Kingdom: Animalia
- Phylum: Arthropoda
- Clade: Pancrustacea
- Class: Insecta
- Order: Lepidoptera
- Family: Argyresthiidae
- Genus: Argyresthia
- Species: A. media

Binomial name
- Argyresthia media Braun, 1914

Species of moth

Argyresthia media is a moth of the family Yponomeutidae. It is found in North America, including Ohio.

The wingspan is about 9 mm.
