= Argyresthia perezi =

Scientific classification
- Kingdom: Animalia
- Phylum: Arthropoda
- Clade: Pancrustacea
- Class: Insecta
- Order: Lepidoptera
- Family: Argyresthiidae
- Genus: Argyresthia
- Species: A. perezi

Binomial name
- Argyresthia perezi Vives, 2001

Synonyms
- Argyresthia (Blastotere) perezi

Species of moth

Argyresthia perezi is a moth of the family Yponomeutidae. It is found in Spain.
