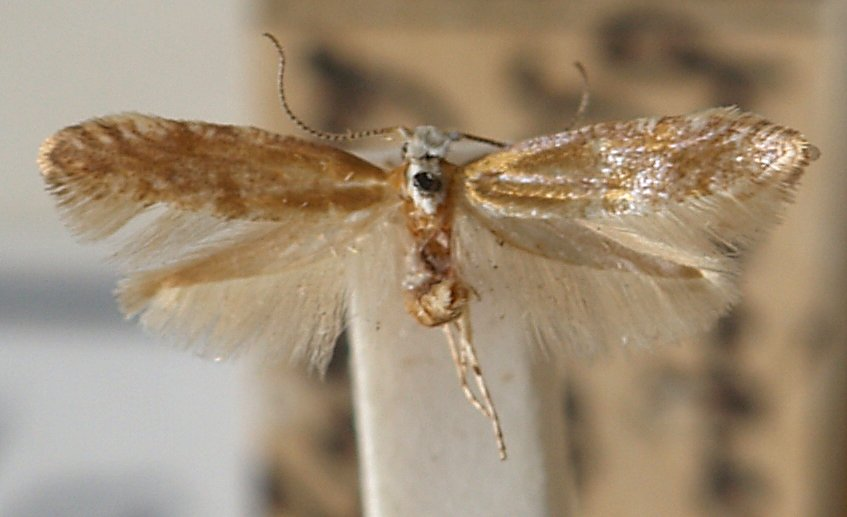

Scientific classification
- Kingdom: Animalia
- Phylum: Arthropoda
- Clade: Pancrustacea
- Class: Insecta
- Order: Lepidoptera
- Family: Argyresthiidae
- Genus: Argyresthia
- Species: A. dilectella

Binomial name
- Argyresthia dilectella Zeller, 1847

Synonyms
- Argyresthia (Blastotere) dilectella

= Argyresthia dilectella =

Species of moth

Argyresthia dilectella is a moth of the family Yponomeutidae. It is found in Northern Europe and Central Europe.

The wingspan is 7–9 mm. The head is white. Forewings are violet-whitish, suffusedly mixed and irrorated with brownish golden; a transverse oblique mark from middle of dorsum, a small spot on middle of costa and another beyond it usually darker golden-brown; some small darker spots towards apex. Hindwings are pale grey.

The moth flies from June to August..

The larvae feed on Juniperus communis and Chamaecyparis.

== Notes ==
1. The flight season refers to Belgium and The Netherlands. This may vary in other parts of the range.
