= Argyresthia flexilis =

Scientific classification
- Kingdom: Animalia
- Phylum: Arthropoda
- Clade: Pancrustacea
- Class: Insecta
- Order: Lepidoptera
- Family: Argyresthiidae
- Genus: Argyresthia
- Species: A. flexilis

Binomial name
- Argyresthia flexilis Freeman, 1960

Species of moth

Argyresthia flexilis is a moth of the family Yponomeutidae first described by Hugh Avery Freeman in 1960. It is found in the United States in northern Montana and probably the adjacent parts of Canada.

The wingspan is about 11 mm. The forewings are yellowish white and the hindwings are smoky. Adults are on wing in late June.

The larvae feed on Pinus flexilis.
