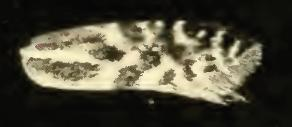
- Wing

Scientific classification
- Kingdom: Animalia
- Phylum: Arthropoda
- Clade: Pancrustacea
- Class: Insecta
- Order: Lepidoptera
- Family: Argyresthiidae
- Genus: Argyresthia
- Species: A. freyella

Binomial name
- Argyresthia freyella Walsingham, 1890

= Argyresthia freyella =

Species of moth

Argyresthia freyella is a moth of the family Yponomeutidae. It is found in North America, including Arkansas, British Columbia, Kentucky, Minnesota, Mississippi, New York, Ohio, Tennessee, Texas and Missouri.

The wingspan is about 8–9 mm.

The larvae feed on Juniperus virginiana. They mine the leaves of their host plant.
