= Argyresthia libocedrella =

Scientific classification
- Kingdom: Animalia
- Phylum: Arthropoda
- Clade: Pancrustacea
- Class: Insecta
- Order: Lepidoptera
- Family: Argyresthiidae
- Genus: Argyresthia
- Species: A. libocedrella

Binomial name
- Argyresthia libocedrella Busck, 1916

Species of moth

Argyresthia libocedrella is a moth of the family Yponomeutidae. It is found in California and Oregon in the United States.

The wingspan is 13–14 mm. The forewings are dark golden yellow with two conspicuous dark brown dorsal spots, one on the middle of the dorsal edge and one at the basal fourth. There are faint traces of slightly darker lines crossing the wing from these dorsal spots. The hindwings are light fuscous.

The larvae feed on Calocedrus decurrens.
