= Argyresthia pallidella =

Scientific classification
- Kingdom: Animalia
- Phylum: Arthropoda
- Clade: Pancrustacea
- Class: Insecta
- Order: Lepidoptera
- Family: Argyresthiidae
- Genus: Argyresthia
- Species: A. pallidella

Binomial name
- Argyresthia pallidella Braun, 1918

Species of moth

Argyresthia pallidella is a moth of the family Yponomeutidae. It was described by Annette Frances Braun in 1918 and is found in North America, including California.

The wingspan is about 11 mm. The forewings are pale shining yellowish white, but the extreme costa in the basal fourth is dark brown. The hindwings are very pale gray or concolorous with the forewings. Adults are on wing in June.

Adults were collected amongst fir, which might be the host plant.
