= Argyresthia mesocausta =

Scientific classification
- Kingdom: Animalia
- Phylum: Arthropoda
- Clade: Pancrustacea
- Class: Insecta
- Order: Lepidoptera
- Family: Argyresthiidae
- Genus: Argyresthia
- Species: A. mesocausta

Binomial name
- Argyresthia mesocausta Meyrick, 1913

Species of moth

Argyresthia mesocausta is a moth of the family Yponomeutidae. It is found in North America.
