= Argyresthia affinis =

Scientific classification
- Kingdom: Animalia
- Phylum: Arthropoda
- Clade: Pancrustacea
- Class: Insecta
- Order: Lepidoptera
- Family: Argyresthiidae
- Genus: Argyresthia
- Species: A. affinis

Binomial name
- Argyresthia affinis Braun, 1940

Species of moth

Argyresthia affinis is a moth of the family Yponomeutidae. It is found in North America, including Kentucky and Ohio.

The larvae feed on Juniperus virginiana. They mine the leaves of their host plant.
