= Argyresthia trifasciae =

Scientific classification
- Kingdom: Animalia
- Phylum: Arthropoda
- Clade: Pancrustacea
- Class: Insecta
- Order: Lepidoptera
- Family: Argyresthiidae
- Genus: Argyresthia
- Species: A. trifasciae

Binomial name
- Argyresthia trifasciae Braun, 1910

Species of moth

Argyresthia trifasciae is a moth of the family Yponomeutidae. It is found in North America, including California.

The wingspan is 7-7.5 mm. The forewings are shining white with a faint yellowish tinge, and marked with pale golden. The hindwings are pale yellow.

The larvae feed on Thuja occidentalis, as well as Juniperus and Cupressus species, including Cupressus macrocarpa.
