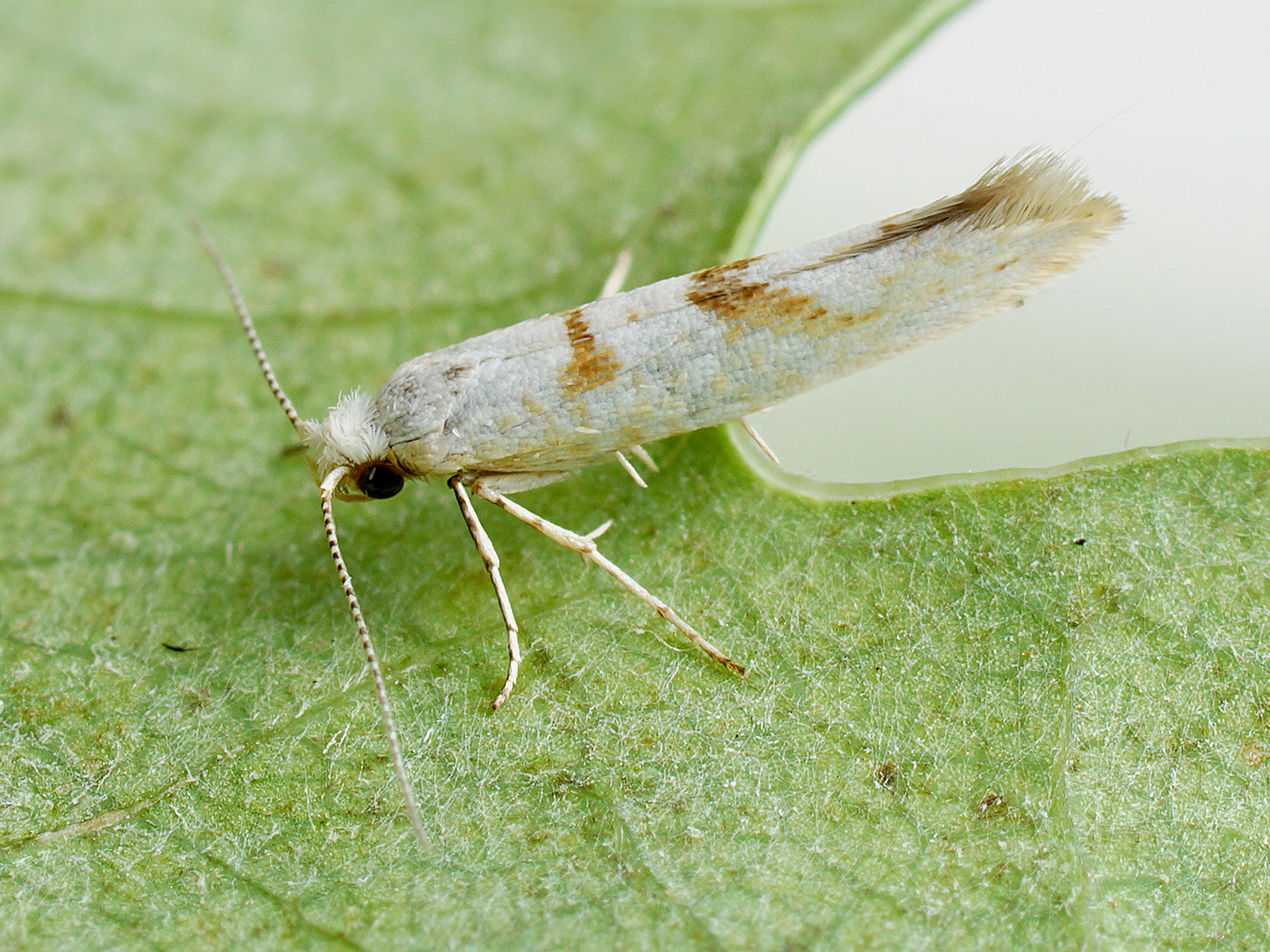

Scientific classification
- Kingdom: Animalia
- Phylum: Arthropoda
- Clade: Pancrustacea
- Class: Insecta
- Order: Lepidoptera
- Family: Argyresthiidae
- Genus: Argyresthia
- Species: A. submontana

Binomial name
- Argyresthia submontana Frey, 1871

= Argyresthia submontana =

Species of moth

Argyresthia submontana is a moth of the family Yponomeutidae. It is found in Sweden, Finland, Germany, Poland, Slovakia, Austria, Switzerland, Italy and France.

The wingspan is 11–13 mm. Adults are on wing from June to August.

The larvae feed on Sorbus aria and possibly also cultivated Cotoneaster species.
