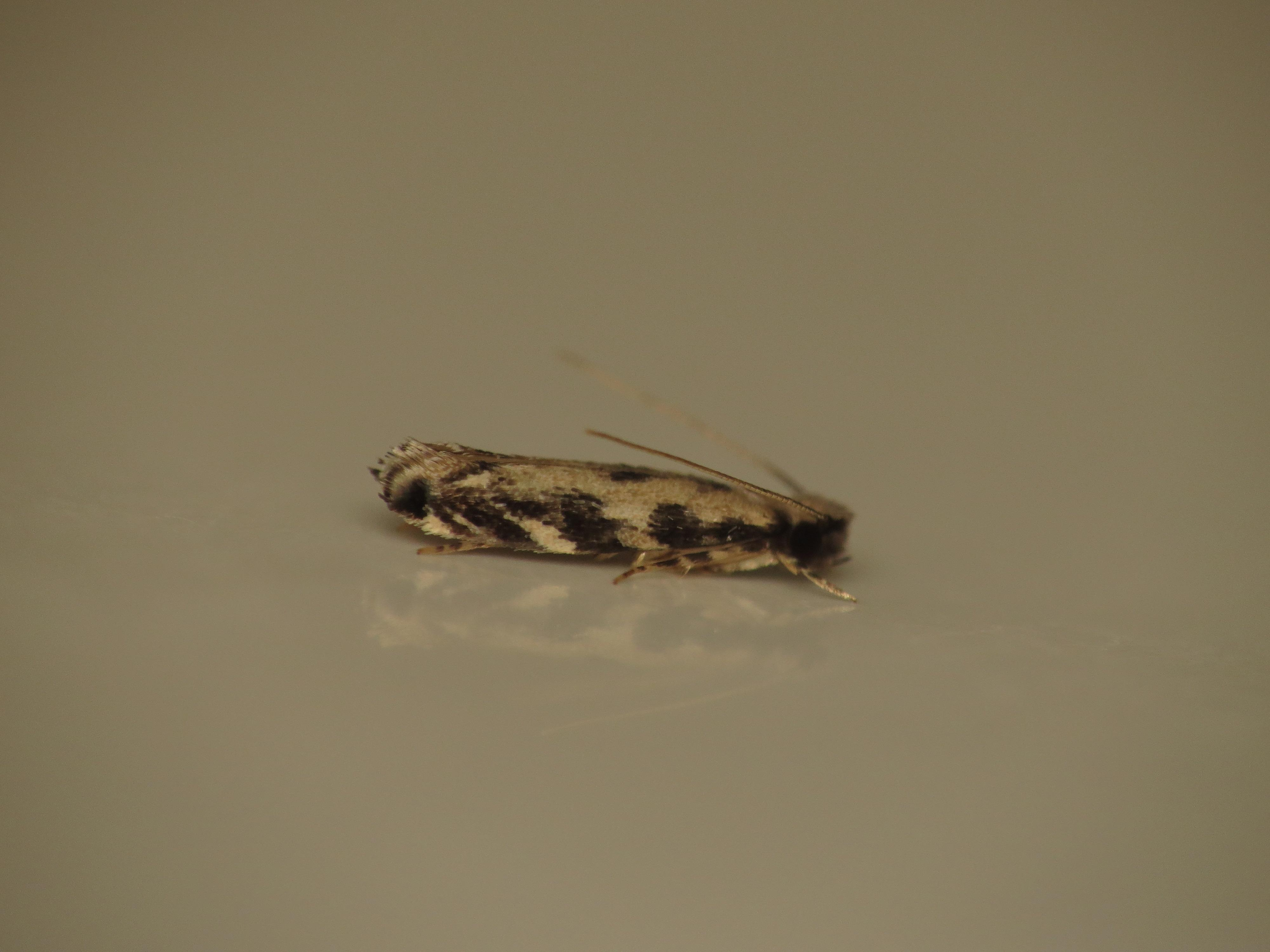

Scientific classification
- Kingdom: Animalia
- Phylum: Arthropoda
- Clade: Pancrustacea
- Class: Insecta
- Order: Lepidoptera
- Family: Tineidae
- Genus: Erechthias
- Species: E. zebrina

Binomial name
- Erechthias zebrina (Butler, 1881)

Synonyms
- Argyresthia zebrina Butler, 1881; Ereunetis zebrina; Erechthias caustophara Turner, 1923; Ereunetis lanceolata Walsingham, 1897; Tinexotaxa travestita Gozmány, 1968; Ereunetis xenica Meyrick, 1911

= Erechthias zebrina =

Species of moth

Erechthias zebrina is a fungus moth (family Tineidae). Initially, it was mistakenly believed to be an ermine moth (family Yponomeutidae) of genus Argyresthia.

This species has a wingspan of 8–10 mm. It was first described by Arthur Gardiner Butler in 1881 from Hawaii, but is a widespread species reported from Africa, the Seychelles, Réunion, Mauritius, Sri Lanka, India, Australia, China, Java, Borneo, Fiji, Samoa, Society Islands, South America (including Brazil) and the West Indies.
