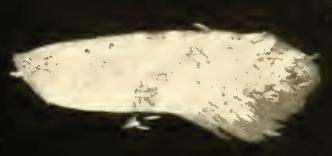
- Wing

Scientific classification
- Kingdom: Animalia
- Phylum: Arthropoda
- Clade: Pancrustacea
- Class: Insecta
- Order: Lepidoptera
- Family: Argyresthiidae
- Genus: Argyresthia
- Species: A. pedmontella

Binomial name
- Argyresthia pedmontella Chambers, 1877

= Argyresthia pedmontella =

Species of moth

Argyresthia pedmontella is a moth of the family Yponomeutidae. It is found in North America, including Colorado.

The wingspan is about 13 mm. The forewings are white, strongly suffused with dark brown on the costal and apical parts. The dorsal part below the fold is only slightly sprinkled with dark scales. There is an irregular series of darker brown spots intervened by pure white dashes on the costal edge from the basal third to the apex. Around the apex and along the base of the dorsal cilia, a thin blackish-brown line is found. Furthermore, there is large, oblique, dark brown spot shaped like a parallelogram on the middle of the dorsal edge, reaching across the light dorsal area to the more densely dusted costal part. The hindwings are light fuscous.
