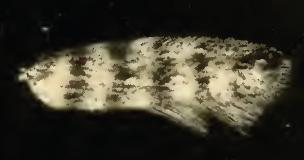
- Wing

Scientific classification
- Kingdom: Animalia
- Phylum: Arthropoda
- Clade: Pancrustacea
- Class: Insecta
- Order: Lepidoptera
- Family: Argyresthiidae
- Genus: Argyresthia
- Species: A. quadristrigella

Binomial name
- Argyresthia quadristrigella Zeller, 1873

= Argyresthia quadristrigella =

Species of moth

Argyresthia quadristrigella is a moth of the family Yponomeutidae. It is found in North America, including Ohio, Oklahoma and Texas.

The wingspan is about 10 mm.

The larvae feed on Juniperus virginiana.
