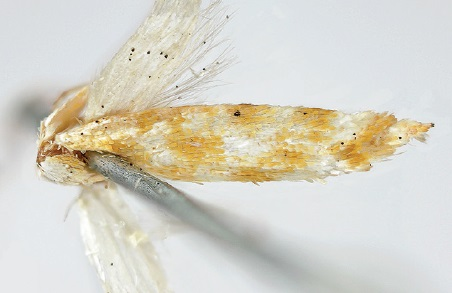

Scientific classification
- Kingdom: Animalia
- Phylum: Arthropoda
- Clade: Pancrustacea
- Class: Insecta
- Order: Lepidoptera
- Family: Argyresthiidae
- Genus: Argyresthia
- Species: A. luteella

Binomial name
- Argyresthia luteella (Chambers, 1875)

Synonyms
- Eurynome luteella Chambers, 1875; Busckia luteella; Philonome luteella

= Argyresthia luteella =

Species of moth

Argyresthia luteella is a moth of the family Yponomeutidae. It is found in the western United States, where it has been recorded from Colorado.

The length of the forewings is about 3.4 mm. The forewings are lustrous yellowish white with the basal and apical areas yellowish orange. The antemedian, postmedian and subterminal fasciae are yellowish orange, oblique and indistinctly outlined. The hindwings are lustrous yellowish white.
