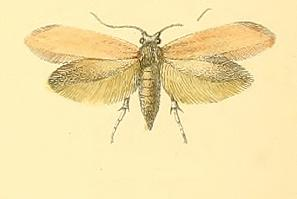

Scientific classification
- Kingdom: Animalia
- Phylum: Arthropoda
- Clade: Pancrustacea
- Class: Insecta
- Order: Lepidoptera
- Family: Argyresthiidae
- Genus: Argyresthia
- Species: A. bergiella

Binomial name
- Argyresthia bergiella (Ratzeburg, 1840)

Synonyms
- Blastotere bergiella Ratzeburg, 1840; Argyresthia (Blastotere) bergiella

= Argyresthia bergiella =

Species of moth

Argyresthia bergiella is a moth of the family Yponomeutidae. It is found in most of Europe, except Ireland, Great Britain, Belgium, the Iberian Peninsula and most of the Balkan Peninsula.

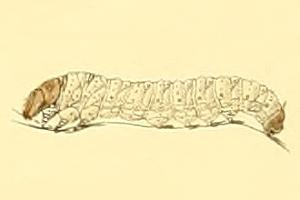
Larva

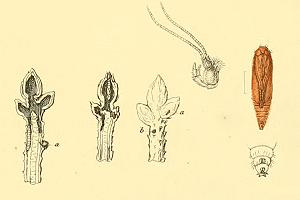
Damage, head and pupa

The wingspan is 11–12 mm.

The larvae feed on Picea abies and Pinus species.
