= Argyresthia kasyi =

Scientific classification
- Kingdom: Animalia
- Phylum: Arthropoda
- Clade: Pancrustacea
- Class: Insecta
- Order: Lepidoptera
- Family: Argyresthiidae
- Genus: Argyresthia
- Species: A. kasyi

Binomial name
- Argyresthia kasyi Friese, 1963

Species of moth

Argyresthia kasyi is a moth of the family Yponomeutidae. It is found in the Republic of Macedonia.
