= Argyresthia impura =

Scientific classification
- Kingdom: Animalia
- Phylum: Arthropoda
- Clade: Pancrustacea
- Class: Insecta
- Order: Lepidoptera
- Family: Argyresthiidae
- Genus: Argyresthia
- Species: A. impura

Binomial name
- Argyresthia impura Staudinger, 1880

Synonyms
- Argyresthia (Blastotere) impura

Species of moth

Argyresthia impura is a moth of the family Yponomeutidae. It is found in North Macedonia.

The wingspan is 12–14 mm.
