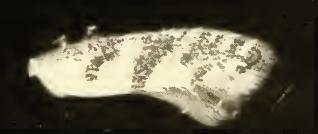
- Wing

Scientific classification
- Kingdom: Animalia
- Phylum: Arthropoda
- Clade: Pancrustacea
- Class: Insecta
- Order: Lepidoptera
- Family: Argyresthiidae
- Genus: Argyresthia
- Species: A. austerella

Binomial name
- Argyresthia austerella Zeller, 1873

= Argyresthia austerella =

Species of moth

Argyresthia austerella is a moth of the family Yponomeutidae. It is found in North America, including Florida, Texas, Oklahoma, Ohio, Kentucky, Illinois, Missouri, New Hampshire and Maryland.

The wingspan is 8–9 mm. The forewings are white, with striking dark-brown markings. The entire costal edge and apical part of the wing are mottled with dark brown, in which the ground colour appears as small dots and dashes, especially in the apical part. Before the middle of the costa, a dark brown, nearly black, inwardly oblique streak is found, reaching to the fold. From just beyond the middle of the costa runs a broader blackish brown fascia parallel with the first costal streak, but reaching the costal edge. At the apical third is a third dark streak parallel to the other two, but generally more or less diffused into the dark apical part of the wing.
