= Argyresthia arceuthobiella =

Scientific classification
- Kingdom: Animalia
- Phylum: Arthropoda
- Clade: Pancrustacea
- Class: Insecta
- Order: Lepidoptera
- Family: Argyresthiidae
- Genus: Argyresthia
- Species: A. arceuthobiella

Binomial name
- Argyresthia arceuthobiella Busck, 1916

Species of moth

Argyresthia arceuthobiella is a moth of the family Yponomeutidae. It is found in North America, including California and Oregon.

The wingspan is about 7 mm. The forewings are golden yellow with a narrow lead-coloured costal edge, a narrow longitudinal central white streak and a narrow white dorsal edge. The apical third of the wing is overlaid with lead-coloured scales. The hindwings are light silvery fuscous.

The larvae feed on Calocedrus decurrens.
