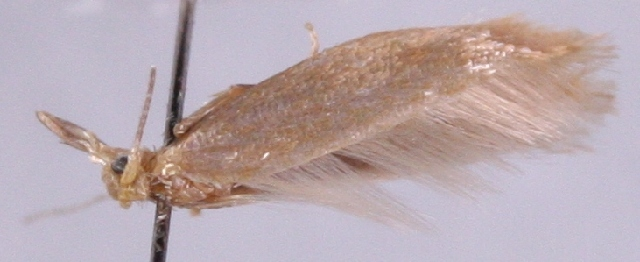

Scientific classification
- Kingdom: Animalia
- Phylum: Arthropoda
- Clade: Pancrustacea
- Class: Insecta
- Order: Lepidoptera
- Family: Argyresthiidae
- Genus: Argyresthia
- Species: A. praecocella

Binomial name
- Argyresthia praecocella Zeller, 1839

Synonyms
- Argyresthia (Blastotere) praecocella

= Argyresthia praecocella =

Species of moth

Argyresthia praecocella, the ochreous argent or juniper berry miner moth, is a moth of the family Yponomeutidae. It is found in most of Europe, except Ireland, Portugal and the Balkan Peninsula. It is also found in Russia and across the Palearctic to Japan.

The wingspan is 9–10 mm.

The larvae feed on Juniperus communis and Juniperus rigida. They feed within the berries of their host plant. The species overwinters as a prepupa.
