= Argyresthia pilatella =

Scientific classification
- Kingdom: Animalia
- Phylum: Arthropoda
- Clade: Pancrustacea
- Class: Insecta
- Order: Lepidoptera
- Family: Argyresthiidae
- Genus: Argyresthia
- Species: A. pilatella

Binomial name
- Argyresthia pilatella Braun, 1910

Species of moth

Argyresthia pilatella is a moth of the family Yponomeutidae. It is found in North America, including California.

The wingspan is 9.5-10.5 mm. The forewings are somewhat shining whitish, almost overlaid with brownish gray scales. The hindwings are silvery gray. Adults are on wing from early March to late June in one generation per year.

The larvae feed on Pinus radiata.
