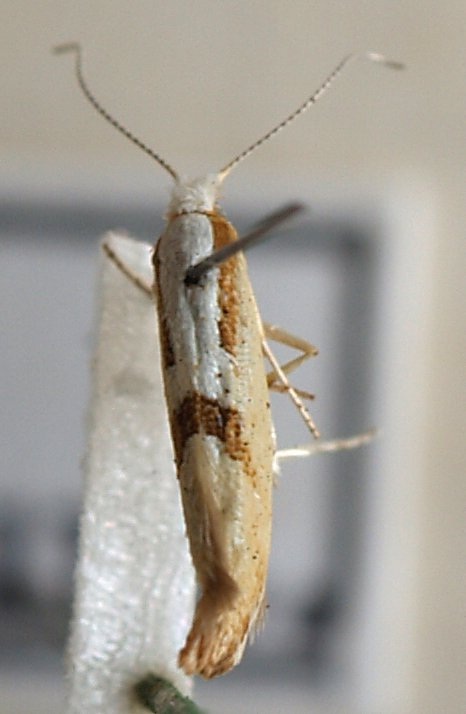

Scientific classification
- Kingdom: Animalia
- Phylum: Arthropoda
- Clade: Pancrustacea
- Class: Insecta
- Order: Lepidoptera
- Family: Argyresthiidae
- Genus: Argyresthia
- Species: A. semitestacella

Binomial name
- Argyresthia semitestacella (Curtis, 1833)

Synonyms
- Ederesa semitestacella Curtis, 1833; Argyresthia (Argyresthia) semitestacella

= Argyresthia semitestacella =

Species of moth

Argyresthia semitestacella is a moth of the family Yponomeutidae. It is found in Europe.

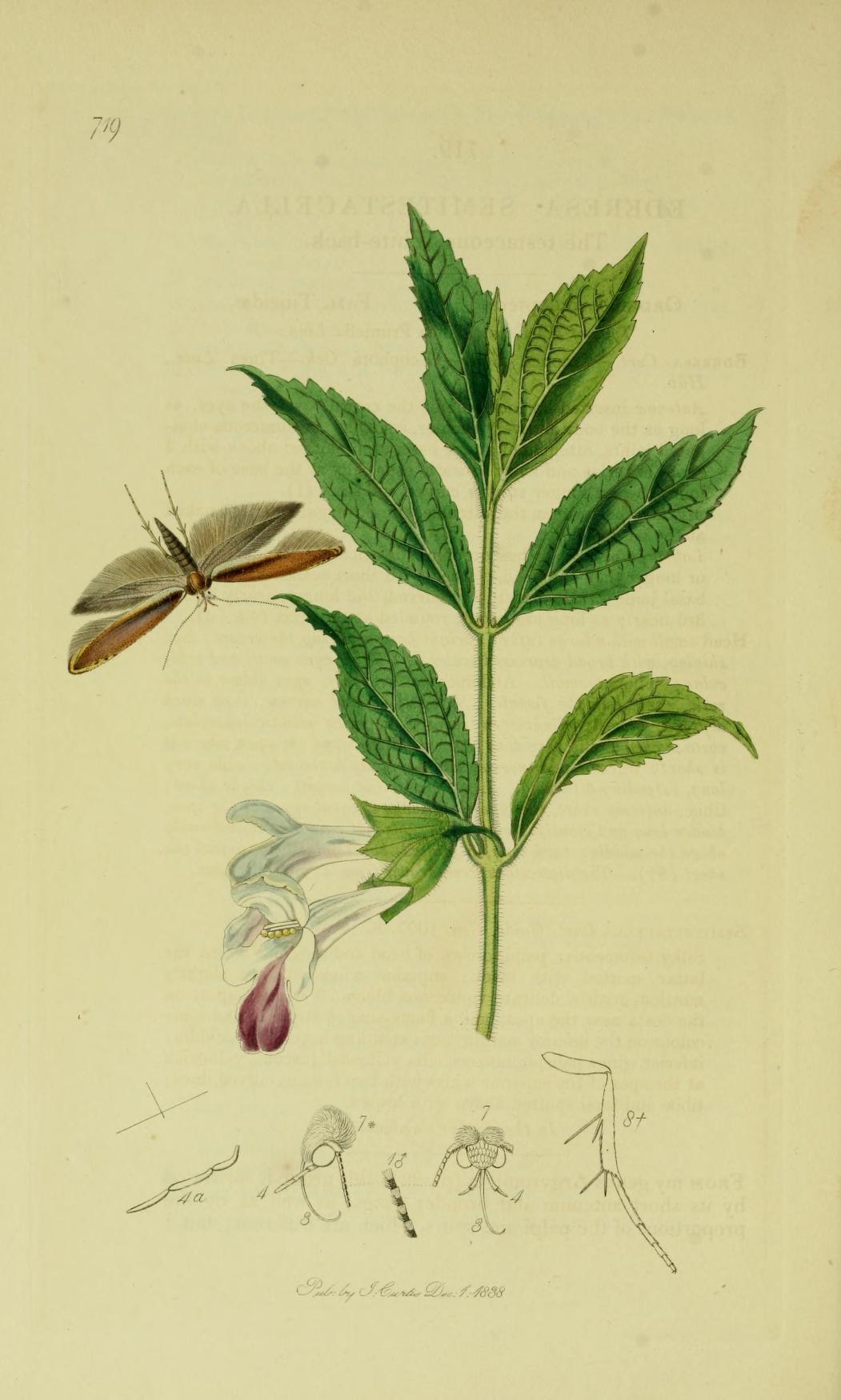
Illustration from John Curtis's British Entomology, Volume 6

The wingspan is 11–14 mm. The head is yellowish white. Forewings are light ferruginous-brown, faintly purplish tinged; a thick whitish dorsal streak to tornus, interrupted by a dark ferruginous-brown triangular median spot. Hindwings are grey.

In the United Kingdom, the moth flies from August to September. The larvae feed on beech.
