= Argyresthia picea =

Scientific classification
- Kingdom: Animalia
- Phylum: Arthropoda
- Clade: Pancrustacea
- Class: Insecta
- Order: Lepidoptera
- Family: Argyresthiidae
- Genus: Argyresthia
- Species: A. picea

Binomial name
- Argyresthia picea Freeman, 1972

Species of moth

Argyresthia picea is a moth of the family Yponomeutidae. It is found in Canada, including Alberta, Ontario, Quebec and the Yukon.

The larvae feed on Picea glauca.

== Distribution ==
The bud and twig miner Argyresthia picea Freeman has been found on white spruce in Yukon Territory, Ontario, and southern Quebec, but has not caused serious damage (Rose and Lindquist 1985). The larva overwinters in the bud. In the spring, when full-grown, the larva is about 5 mm long and cream coloured, with blackish head and legs. It pupates in the mined tips from mid-May to late June, and the tiny adult emerges shortly thereafter from a silk-covered hole in or below the base of the dead bud. One generation is completed each year.
