= Argyresthia ruidosa =

Scientific classification
- Kingdom: Animalia
- Phylum: Arthropoda
- Clade: Pancrustacea
- Class: Insecta
- Order: Lepidoptera
- Family: Argyresthiidae
- Genus: Argyresthia
- Species: A. ruidosa

Binomial name
- Argyresthia ruidosa Braun, 1940

Species of moth

Argyresthia ruidosa is a moth of the family Yponomeutidae. It is found in North America, including New Mexico.

Adults are pale golden in color.
