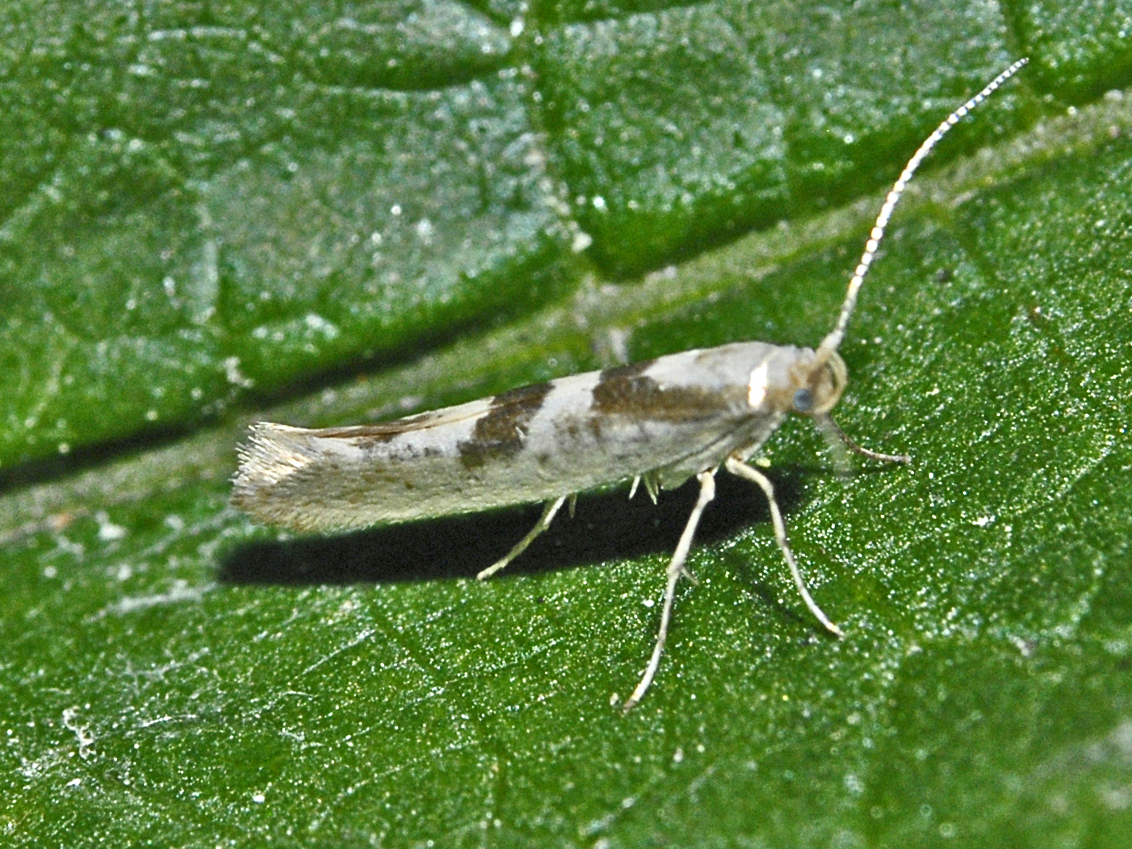

Scientific classification
- Kingdom: Animalia
- Phylum: Arthropoda
- Clade: Pancrustacea
- Class: Insecta
- Order: Lepidoptera
- Family: Argyresthiidae
- Genus: Argyresthia
- Species: A. pygmaeella

Binomial name
- Argyresthia pygmaeella (Denis & Schiffermüller, 1775)

Synonyms
- Tinea pygmaeella Denis & Schiffermuller, 1775; Argyresthia (Argyresthia) pygmaeella; Tinea rudolphella Esper, 1791

= Argyresthia pygmaeella =

Species of moth

Argyresthia pygmaeella is a moth of the family Yponomeutidae. The species was first described by Michael Denis and Ignaz Schiffermüller in 1775 from a specimen found near Vienna, Austria

== Description ==
The wingspan is 11–14 mm. Forewings are white, with golden or brown markings, while hind wings are grey. Legs and antennae are white. Meyrick- Head and thorax ochreous-whitish, patagia golden. Forewings shining golden whitish; a dorsal spot at 1/3 connected with base by a streak along fold, an outwardly oblique streak from middle of dorsum, and a tornal spot shining golden. Hindwings grey.

They fly in a single generation from May to August, depending on location.

== Biology ==
Eggs are laid on willows and the larvae overwinter in leaf-buds until April when they bore into a shoot, causing it to droop. They can also feed on catkins. When full grown in May or June the larvae are 11 mm long with a green body and dark-brown to black head, prothoracic and anal shields. Pupation takes place either in the feeding place or on the ground in May or June.

Recorded food plants include goat willow (Salix caprea) and grey willow (Salix cinerea)

== Habitat ==
In North America these moths mainly live in mountainous areas, but are also present in prairies with the host plants.

== Distribution ==
This species can be found in Europe, northern Asia and North America.
