= Argyresthia abies =

Scientific classification
- Kingdom: Animalia
- Phylum: Arthropoda
- Clade: Pancrustacea
- Class: Insecta
- Order: Lepidoptera
- Family: Argyresthiidae
- Genus: Argyresthia
- Species: A. abies

Binomial name
- Argyresthia abies Freeman, 1972

Species of moth

Argyresthia abies is a moth of the family Yponomeutidae first described by Hugh Avery Freeman in 1972. It is found in the Canadian provinces of Alberta, Saskatchewan and northern Ontario.

The wingspan is 10–11.5 mm. Adults are on wing from early June to early July.

The larvae feed on Abies balsamea. They bore in the terminal twigs of their host plant.
