= Argyresthia furcatella =

Scientific classification
- Kingdom: Animalia
- Phylum: Arthropoda
- Clade: Pancrustacea
- Class: Insecta
- Order: Lepidoptera
- Family: Argyresthiidae
- Genus: Argyresthia
- Species: A. furcatella

Binomial name
- Argyresthia furcatella Busck, 1916

Species of moth

Argyresthia furcatella is a moth of the family Yponomeutidae. It is found in North America, including Colorado.

The wingspan is 12–13 mm. The forewings are white, sprinkled with dark brown transverse reticulations especially toward the apex. From the middle of the dorsum runs an ill-defined outwardly oblique, dark brown fascia to beyond the end of the cell. There is a small round dark brown spot on the fold between this and the base and a series of dark brown marginal spots begin on the middle of the costa and reach round to the tornus. The hindwings are ochreous fuscous.

The larvae feed on Quercus species. The species was reared from a cynipid gall on oak.
