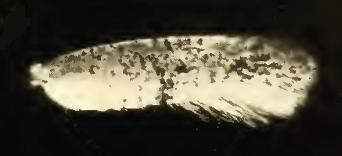
- Wings

Scientific classification
- Kingdom: Animalia
- Phylum: Arthropoda
- Clade: Pancrustacea
- Class: Insecta
- Order: Lepidoptera
- Family: Argyresthiidae
- Genus: Argyresthia
- Species: A. deletella

Binomial name
- Argyresthia deletella Zeller, 1873

= Argyresthia deletella =

Species of moth

Argyresthia deletella is a species of moth of the family Yponomeutidae. It is found in North America, including Texas.

The wingspan is about 10 mm. The forewings are whitish yellow, but darker on the costal and apical parts than below the fold and irregularly sprinkled with small indistinct brownish transverse streaks. On the middle of the dorsal edge is a poorly defined brown transverse marking, crossing the light dorsal part and reaching beyond the fold. The hindwings are light ochreous grey.
