= Argyresthia altissimella =

Scientific classification
- Kingdom: Animalia
- Phylum: Arthropoda
- Clade: Pancrustacea
- Class: Insecta
- Order: Lepidoptera
- Family: Argyresthiidae
- Genus: Argyresthia
- Species: A. altissimella

Binomial name
- Argyresthia altissimella Chambers, 1877

Species of moth

Argyresthia altissimella is a moth of the family Yponomeutidae. It is found in North America, including Colorado.

The wingspan is about 12 mm.
