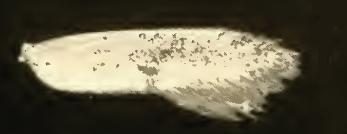
- Wing

Scientific classification
- Kingdom: Animalia
- Phylum: Arthropoda
- Clade: Pancrustacea
- Class: Insecta
- Order: Lepidoptera
- Family: Argyresthiidae
- Genus: Argyresthia
- Species: A. rileiella

Binomial name
- Argyresthia rileiella Busck, 1907

= Argyresthia rileiella =

Species of moth

Argyresthia rileiella is a moth of the family Yponomeutidae. It is found in North America, including Washington, D.C.

The wingspan is about 9 mm. The forewings are white, above the fold strongly suffused with golden brown especially toward the apex. There is an irregular series of ill-defined small darker brown spots intervened with whitish along the outer half of the costal edge. The dorsal edge below the fold is nearly immaculate white up to the middle of the wing, where it is cut off by a large ill-defined dark brown patch, which crosses the fold and gradually widens out and is lost in the dark portion of the wing. The hindwings are light ochreous fuscous.

== Etymology ==
The species is named in honor of the collector, Professor Charles Valentine Riley.
