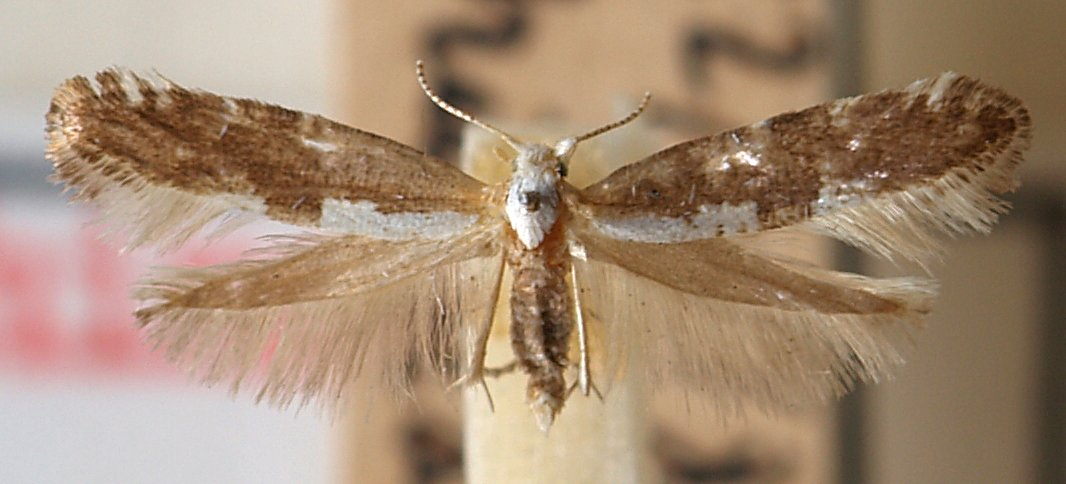

Scientific classification
- Kingdom: Animalia
- Phylum: Arthropoda
- Clade: Pancrustacea
- Class: Insecta
- Order: Lepidoptera
- Family: Argyresthiidae
- Genus: Argyresthia
- Species: A. spinosella

Binomial name
- Argyresthia spinosella Stainton, 1849

Synonyms
- Argyresthia (Argyresthia) spinosella; Erminea mendica Haworth, 1828; Argyresthia mendica; Argyresthia (Argyresthia) mendica

= Argyresthia spinosella =

Species of moth

Argyresthia spinosella, or the blackthorn tip moth, is a moth of the family Yponomeutidae. It is found in Europe and Anatolia.

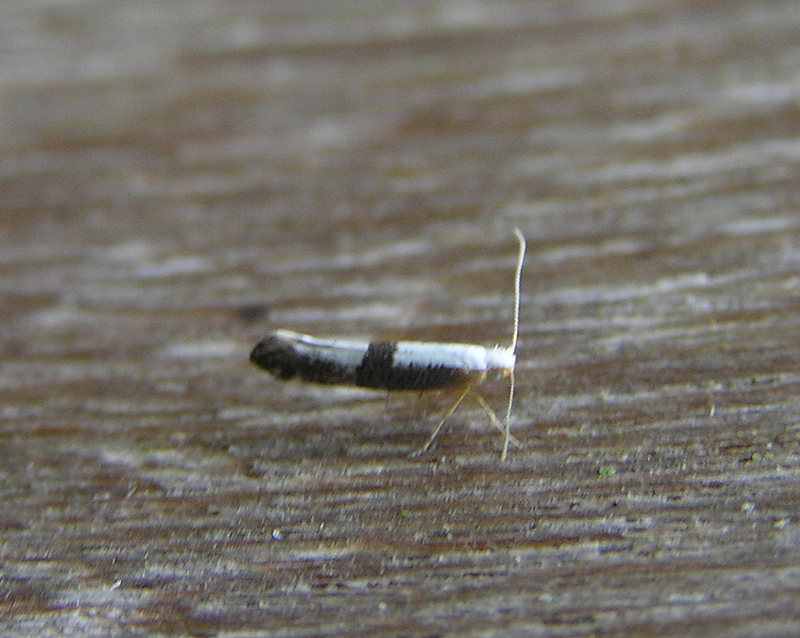
Argyresthia spinosella, Goes, the Netherlands

The wingspan is 9–11 mm. The head is white. Forewings are fuscous, with purple reflections, base ochreous; a thick white dorsal streak to tornus; a darker fuscous median fascia, interrupted in disc, edged with whitish on costa; some whitish costal strigulae posteriorly. Hindwings are grey.

The moth flies from May to July..

The larvae feed on the plums and flowering shoots of blackthorn (Prunus spinosa).

== Notes ==
1. The flight season refers to Belgium and The Netherlands. This may vary in other parts of the range.
