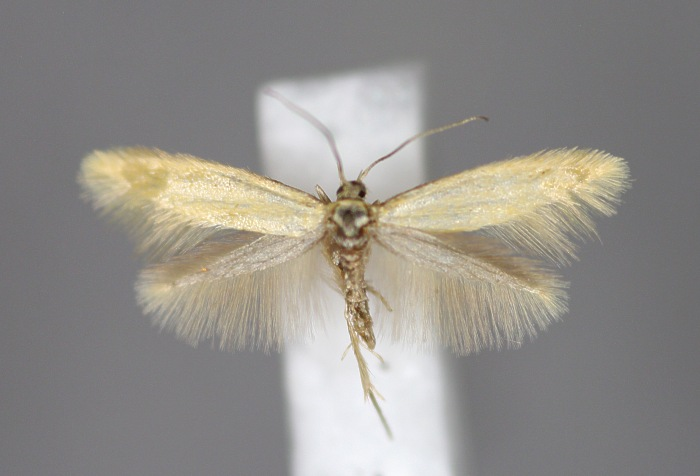

Scientific classification
- Kingdom: Animalia
- Phylum: Arthropoda
- Clade: Pancrustacea
- Class: Insecta
- Order: Lepidoptera
- Family: Argyresthiidae
- Genus: Argyresthia
- Species: A. illuminatella

Binomial name
- Argyresthia illuminatella Zeller, 1839

Synonyms
- Argyresthia (Blastotere) illuminatella

= Argyresthia illuminatella =

Species of moth

Argyresthia illuminatella is a moth of the family Yponomeutidae. It is found in most Europe, except Ireland, Great Britain, Portugal, Fennoscandia, Hungary, Slovenia and Greece.

The wingspan is 9.5-10.5 mm. Adults are on wing from the end of April to June. There is one generation per year.

The larvae feed on Abies alba.
