= Argyresthia notoleuca =

Scientific classification
- Kingdom: Animalia
- Phylum: Arthropoda
- Clade: Pancrustacea
- Class: Insecta
- Order: Lepidoptera
- Family: Argyresthiidae
- Genus: Argyresthia
- Species: A. notoleuca

Binomial name
- Argyresthia notoleuca (Turner, 1913)

Synonyms
- Zelleria notoleuca Turner, 1913

Species of moth

Argyresthia notoleuca is a moth of the family Yponomeutidae. It is found in northern Australia.

The wingspan is about 10 mm. Adults are grey with an indistinct white line along the costa of the forewings.

It is found in rainforest from Townsville north to Cairns and the Atherton Tablelands. Nothing is known about its biology.
