= Argyresthia huguenini =

Scientific classification
- Kingdom: Animalia
- Phylum: Arthropoda
- Clade: Pancrustacea
- Class: Insecta
- Order: Lepidoptera
- Family: Argyresthiidae
- Genus: Argyresthia
- Species: A. huguenini

Binomial name
- Argyresthia huguenini Frey, 1882

Species of moth

Argyresthia huguenini is a moth of the family Yponomeutidae. It is found in Switzerland.

It was described from a single specimen collected by Anderegg, probably in Wallis. The species has not been collected since and the identity cannot be stated from the original description alone.
