= Argyresthia columbia =

Scientific classification
- Kingdom: Animalia
- Phylum: Arthropoda
- Clade: Pancrustacea
- Class: Insecta
- Order: Lepidoptera
- Family: Argyresthiidae
- Genus: Argyresthia
- Species: A. columbia

Binomial name
- Argyresthia columbia Freeman, 1972

Species of moth

Argyresthia columbia is a moth of the family Yponomeutidae first described by Thomas Nesbitt Freeman in 1972. It is found in Canada in south-eastern British Columbia and is possibly also present in Alberta.

The wingspan is 12–14 mm. Adults are on wing from in June.

The larvae feed on Larix occidentalis. They bore into the terminal twigs of their host plant.
