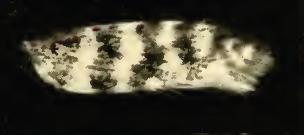
- Wing

Scientific classification
- Kingdom: Animalia
- Phylum: Arthropoda
- Clade: Pancrustacea
- Class: Insecta
- Order: Lepidoptera
- Family: Argyresthiidae
- Genus: Argyresthia
- Species: A. thoracella

Binomial name
- Argyresthia thoracella Busck, 1907

= Argyresthia thoracella =

Species of moth

Argyresthia thoracella is a moth of the family Yponomeutidae. It is found in the United States including Oklahoma, Arizona, Nevada and eastern California.

The wingspan is about 9 mm.

The larvae feed on juniper species.
