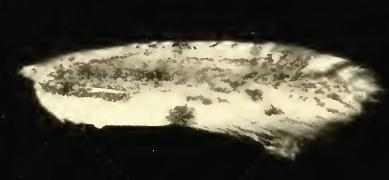
- Wing

Scientific classification
- Kingdom: Animalia
- Phylum: Arthropoda
- Clade: Pancrustacea
- Class: Insecta
- Order: Lepidoptera
- Family: Argyresthiidae
- Genus: Argyresthia
- Species: A. belangerella

Binomial name
- Argyresthia belangerella Chambers, 1877

= Argyresthia belangerella =

Species of moth

Argyresthia belangerella is a moth of the family Argyresthiidae first described by Vactor Tousey Chambers in 1877. It is found in Canada. It might be only a variety of Argyresthia conjugella.

The wingspan is about 13 mm. The costal part of the forewing above the fold is dark brown, with a series of even darker costal spots from the middle to the apex, the outer ones intersected with white dashes. The dorsal part of the wing below and somewhat beyond the folds is ochreous white, with a semicircular, not very well defined dark brown spot on the middle of the dorsal edge and a smaller one at the apical third. The hindwings are dark fuscous.
