= Argyresthia monochromella =

Scientific classification
- Kingdom: Animalia
- Phylum: Arthropoda
- Clade: Pancrustacea
- Class: Insecta
- Order: Lepidoptera
- Family: Argyresthiidae
- Genus: Argyresthia
- Species: A. monochromella

Binomial name
- Argyresthia monochromella Busck, 1921

Species of moth

Argyresthia monochromella is a moth of the family Yponomeutidae first described by August Busck in 1921. It is found in Canada in British Columbia and Alberta.
