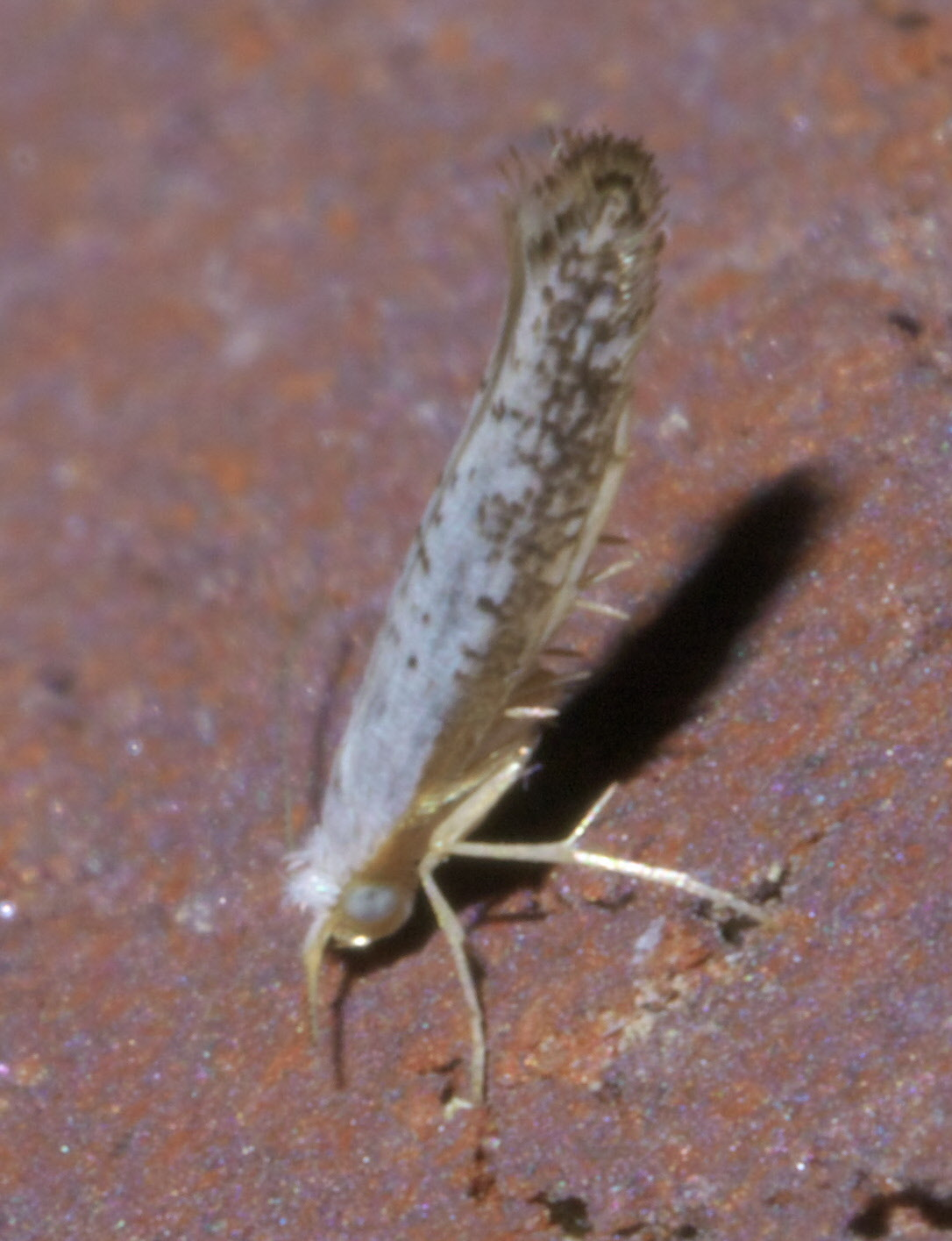

Scientific classification
- Kingdom: Animalia
- Phylum: Arthropoda
- Clade: Pancrustacea
- Class: Insecta
- Order: Lepidoptera
- Family: Argyresthiidae
- Genus: Argyresthia
- Species: A. subreticulata

Binomial name
- Argyresthia subreticulata Walsingham, 1882

= Argyresthia subreticulata =

Species of moth

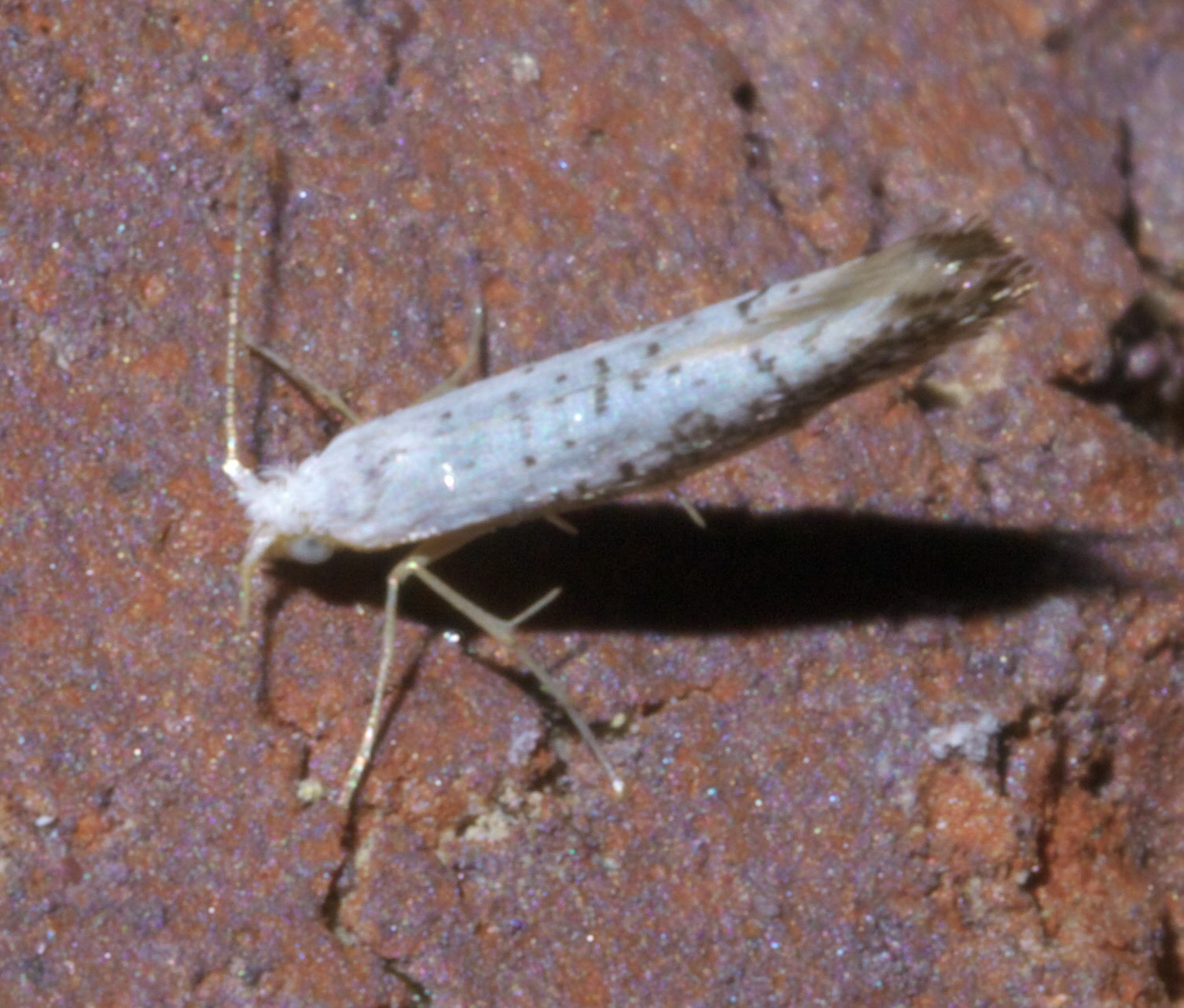
Argyresthia subreticulata, speckled argyresthia

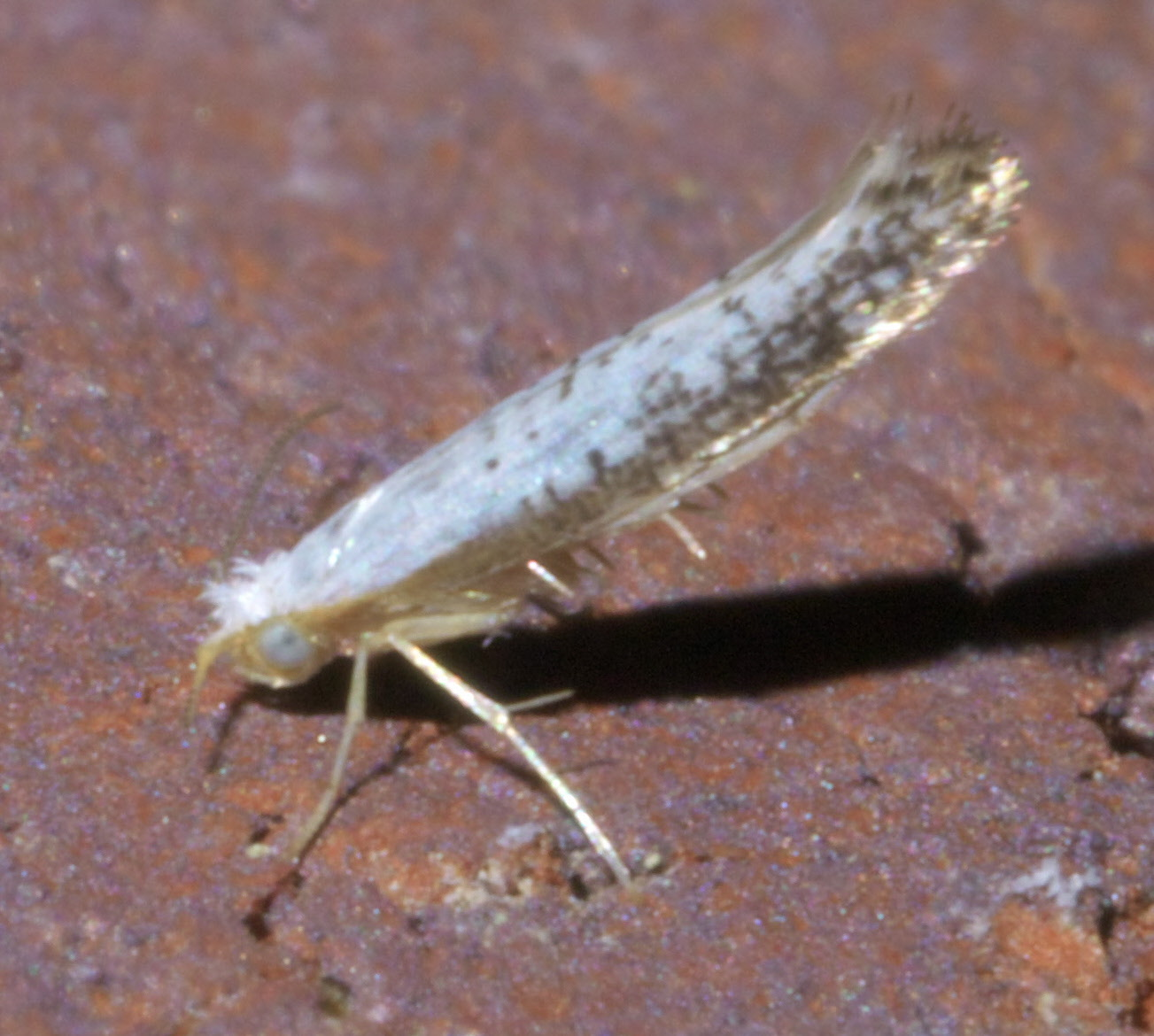
Argyresthia subreticulata, speckled argyresthia, size: about 4 mm

Argyresthia subreticulata, the speckled argyresthia moth, is a species of moth of the family Yponomeutidae. It is found in the United States including Florida, Maryland, Pennsylvania, Ohio, Oklahoma, Tennessee and Texas.

The wingspan is about 9 mm. The dorsal two-thirds of the forewings is pure immaculate white from the base to shortly before the apex. The costal third from the base to the apex is light golden-brown, in the apical part somewhat darker and reticulated with white. The dark part of the wing broadens slightly and gradually toward the apex and reaches to the apical third of the dorsal cilia. A narrow dark bronze line is found around the apical edge. The hindwings are light grey.

The larvae feed on Acer species.
