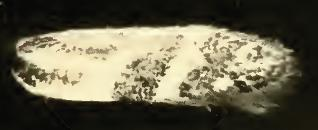
- Wing

Scientific classification
- Kingdom: Animalia
- Phylum: Arthropoda
- Clade: Pancrustacea
- Class: Insecta
- Order: Lepidoptera
- Family: Argyresthiidae
- Genus: Argyresthia
- Species: A. quercicolella

Binomial name
- Argyresthia quercicolella Chambers, 1877

= Argyresthia quercicolella =

Species of moth

Argyresthia quercicolella is a moth of the family Yponomeutidae. It is found in North America, including Colorado.

The wingspan is about 10 mm.

The larvae possibly feed on Quercus species.
