= Argyresthia arceuthina =

Scientific classification
- Kingdom: Animalia
- Phylum: Arthropoda
- Clade: Pancrustacea
- Class: Insecta
- Order: Lepidoptera
- Family: Argyresthiidae
- Genus: Argyresthia
- Species: A. arceuthina

Binomial name
- Argyresthia arceuthina Zeller, 1839

Species of moth

Argyresthia arceuthina is a moth of the family Yponomeutidae. It is found in Europe.

The wingspan is 8–9 mm. The head and thorax are white, patagia bronzy. Forewings are bright shining golden-bronzy. The head is white. Forewings are fuscous, with purple reflections, base ochreous; a thick white dorsal streak to tornus; a darker fuscous median fascia, interrupted in disc, edged with whitish on costa; some whitish costal strigulae posteriorly. Hindwings are pale grey.images

Adults are on wing from April to June depending on the location.

The larvae feed on Juniperus species.
