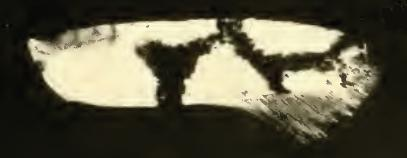
- Wing

Scientific classification
- Kingdom: Animalia
- Phylum: Arthropoda
- Clade: Pancrustacea
- Class: Insecta
- Order: Lepidoptera
- Family: Argyresthiidae
- Genus: Argyresthia
- Species: A. ivella

Binomial name
- Argyresthia ivella (Haworth, 1828)

Synonyms
- Tinea ivella Haworth, 1828; Tinea quadriella Haworth; Oecophora andereggiella Duponchel, 1840; Argyresthia anderreggiella

= Argyresthia ivella =

Species of moth

Argyresthia ivella is a moth of the family Yponomeutidae. It is found in most of Europe, except Ireland, the Netherlands, the Iberian Peninsula, Finland, Italy, Slovakia and most of the Balkan Peninsula.

The wingspan is 10–12 mm. Adults are on wing in July and August.

The larvae feed on Malus and Corylus species, including Corylus avellana. They feed in the shoot of their host plant.
