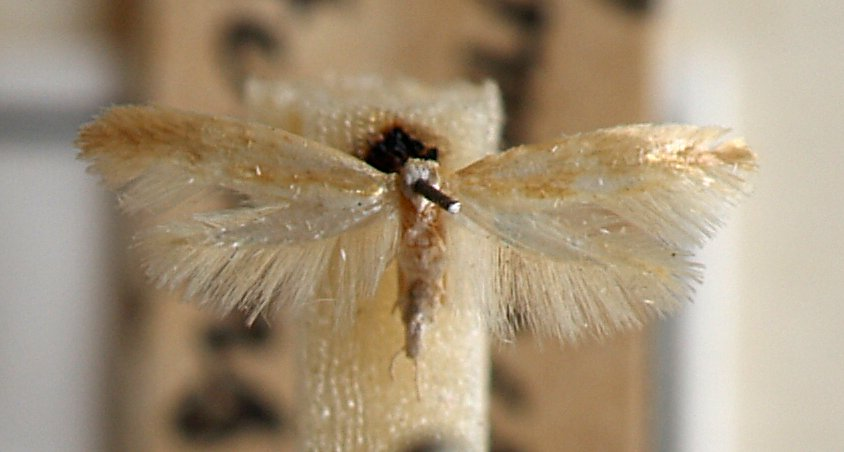

Scientific classification
- Kingdom: Animalia
- Phylum: Arthropoda
- Clade: Pancrustacea
- Class: Insecta
- Order: Lepidoptera
- Family: Argyresthiidae
- Genus: Argyresthia
- Species: A. aurulentella

Binomial name
- Argyresthia aurulentella Stainton, 1849

Synonyms
- Argyresthia (Argyresthia) aurulentella

= Argyresthia aurulentella =

Species of moth

Argyresthia aurulentella is a moth of the family Yponomeutidae. It is found in Northern Europe, Central Europe, western Russia and Macedonia.

The wingspan is 7–9 mm. The moth flies from July to August..

The larvae feed on Juniperus communis.

== Notes ==
1. The flight season refers to Belgium and the Netherlands. This may vary in other parts of the range.
