= Argyresthia amiantella =

Scientific classification
- Kingdom: Animalia
- Phylum: Arthropoda
- Clade: Pancrustacea
- Class: Insecta
- Order: Lepidoptera
- Family: Argyresthiidae
- Genus: Argyresthia
- Species: A. amiantella

Binomial name
- Argyresthia amiantella (Zeller, 1847)

Synonyms
- Blastotere amiantella Zeller, 1847; Argyresthia (Blastotere) amiantella

Species of moth

Argyresthia amiantella is a moth of the family Yponomeutidae. It is found in France, Germany, Poland, the Czech Republic, Slovakia, Austria, Switzerland, Italy and Serbia and Montenegro.

The larvae probably feed on Picea abies.
