= Argyresthia hilfiella =

Scientific classification
- Kingdom: Animalia
- Phylum: Arthropoda
- Clade: Pancrustacea
- Class: Insecta
- Order: Lepidoptera
- Family: Argyresthiidae
- Genus: Argyresthia
- Species: A. hilfiella

Binomial name
- Argyresthia hilfiella Rebel, 1910

Species of moth

Argyresthia hilfiella is a moth of the family Yponomeutidae. It is found in Greece.

The wingspan is about 10.5 mm.
