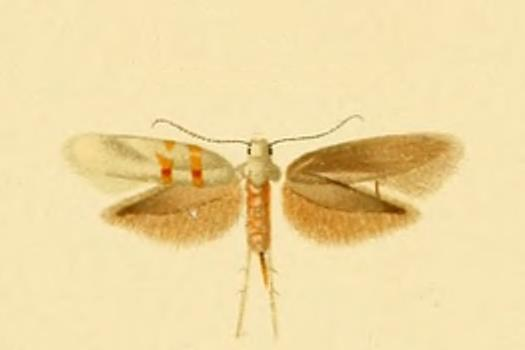

Scientific classification
- Kingdom: Animalia
- Phylum: Arthropoda
- Clade: Pancrustacea
- Class: Insecta
- Order: Lepidoptera
- Family: Argyresthiidae
- Genus: Argyresthia
- Species: A. prenjella

Binomial name
- Argyresthia prenjella Rebel, 1901

= Argyresthia prenjella =

Species of moth

Argyresthia prenjella is a moth of the family Yponomeutidae. It is found in Croatia and Bosnia and Herzegovina.

The wingspan is 12–13 mm.
