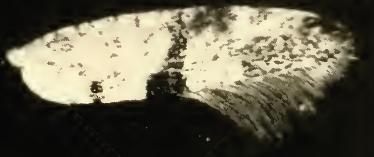
- Wing

Scientific classification
- Kingdom: Animalia
- Phylum: Arthropoda
- Clade: Pancrustacea
- Class: Insecta
- Order: Lepidoptera
- Family: Argyresthiidae
- Genus: Argyresthia
- Species: A. bolliella

Binomial name
- Argyresthia bolliella Busck, 1907

= Argyresthia bolliella =

Species of moth

Argyresthia bolliella is a moth of the family Yponomeutidae. It is found in North America, including Texas.

The wingspan is 10–11 mm. The forewings are white, with dark-brown markings. The hindwings are dark fuscous.

== Etymology ==
The species is named in honor of the collector, Jacob Boll.
