= Argyresthia chalcochrysa =

Scientific classification
- Kingdom: Animalia
- Phylum: Arthropoda
- Clade: Pancrustacea
- Class: Insecta
- Order: Lepidoptera
- Family: Argyresthiidae
- Genus: Argyresthia
- Species: A. chalcochrysa

Binomial name
- Argyresthia chalcochrysa Meyrick, 1913

Species of moth

Argyresthia chalcochrysa is a species of moth in the family Yponomeutidae. It is found in Canada.
