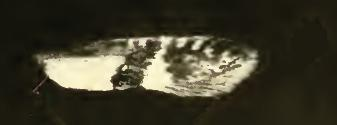
- Wing

Scientific classification
- Kingdom: Animalia
- Phylum: Arthropoda
- Clade: Pancrustacea
- Class: Insecta
- Order: Lepidoptera
- Family: Argyresthiidae
- Genus: Argyresthia
- Species: A. inscriptella

Binomial name
- Argyresthia inscriptella Busck, 1907

= Argyresthia inscriptella =

Species of moth

Argyresthia inscriptella is a moth of the family Yponomeutidae. It is found in North America, including Arizona.

The wingspan is about 8 mm.
