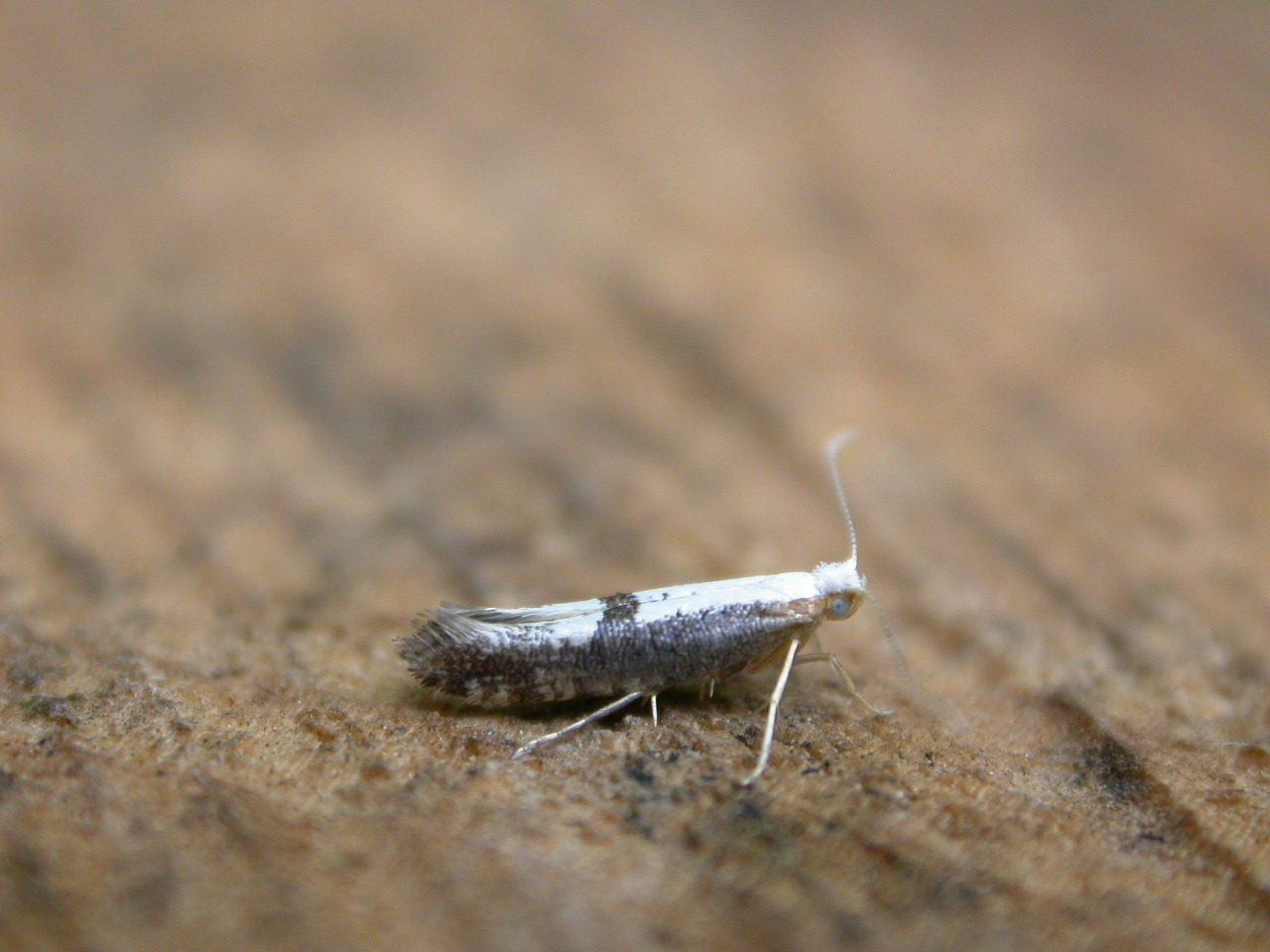

Scientific classification
- Kingdom: Animalia
- Phylum: Arthropoda
- Clade: Pancrustacea
- Class: Insecta
- Order: Lepidoptera
- Family: Argyresthiidae
- Genus: Argyresthia
- Species: A. semifusca

Binomial name
- Argyresthia semifusca (Haworth, 1828)

Synonyms
- Erminea semifusca Haworth, 1828; Ederessa semipurpurella; Argyresthia spiniella Zeller 1839; Argyresthia semipurpurella Stephens, 1835

= Argyresthia semifusca =

Species of moth

Argyresthia semifusca is a moth of the family Yponomeutidae. It is found in Europe.

The wingspan is about 12 mm. The head is white. Forewings are dark purplish-bronzy-fuscous; a thick white dorsal streak to tornus, interrupted by a median spot of ground-colour; costa marked with minute white dashes, posteriorly with three or four white strigulae. Hindwings are grey.

Adults are on the wing from June into late August/early September depending on the location.

The larvae feed on Crataegus and Sorbus aucuparia.
