= Argyresthia pseudotsuga =

Scientific classification
- Kingdom: Animalia
- Phylum: Arthropoda
- Clade: Pancrustacea
- Class: Insecta
- Order: Lepidoptera
- Family: Argyresthiidae
- Genus: Argyresthia
- Species: A. pseudotsuga

Binomial name
- Argyresthia pseudotsuga Freeman, 1972

Species of moth

Argyresthia pseudotsuga is a moth of the family Yponomeutidae. It is found in North America, including Washington.

Adults emerge in April.

The larvae feed on Pseudotsuga menziesii. They mine the twigs and tips of their host plant. Pupation takes place around the end of January.
