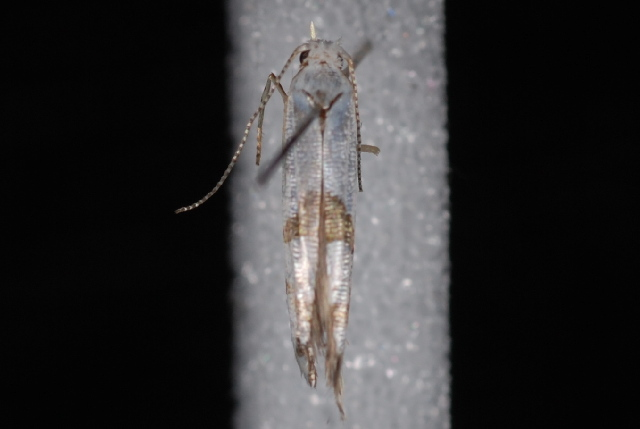

Scientific classification
- Kingdom: Animalia
- Phylum: Arthropoda
- Clade: Pancrustacea
- Class: Insecta
- Order: Lepidoptera
- Family: Argyresthiidae
- Genus: Argyresthia
- Species: A. oreasella

Binomial name
- Argyresthia oreasella Chambers, 1877

= Argyresthia oreasella =

Cherry shoot borer moth

Species of moth

Argyresthia oreasella, the cherry shoot borer moth, is a moth of the family Yponomeutidae. It is found in North America, including New York, Michigan, Idaho, Missouri, Colorado, New Mexico, California, Quebec, Alberta and Saskatchewan.

The wingspan is 10–13 mm. Adults are on wing from the end of June to mid August.
