= Argyresthia lustralis =

Scientific classification
- Kingdom: Animalia
- Phylum: Arthropoda
- Clade: Pancrustacea
- Class: Insecta
- Order: Lepidoptera
- Family: Argyresthiidae
- Genus: Argyresthia
- Species: A. lustralis

Binomial name
- Argyresthia lustralis Meyrick, 1911

Species of moth

Argyresthia lustralis is a moth of the family Yponomeutidae. It is found in the Seychelles (Mahé and Silhouette islands).

The wingspan is 9–11 mm. The head, palpi, and thorax are white, with the shoulders narrowly tinged with brown. The forewings are brownish, finely streaked with blackish markings, and feature a broad snow-white streak occupying the dorsal half of the wing. The hindwings are grey.
