= Argyresthia mariana =

Graybanded leafroller

Scientific classification
- Kingdom: Animalia
- Phylum: Arthropoda
- Clade: Pancrustacea
- Class: Insecta
- Order: Lepidoptera
- Family: Argyresthiidae
- Genus: Argyresthia
- Species: A. mariana

Binomial name
- Argyresthia mariana Freeman, 1972

Species of moth

Argyresthia mariana, the graybanded leafroller, is a moth of the family Yponomeutidae. The species was first described by Thomas Nesbitt Freeman in 1972. It is found in Canada in northern Ontario and possibly Alberta.

The wingspan is 7-8.5 mm. Adults are on wing from mid to late June.

The larvae feed on Picea mariana.
