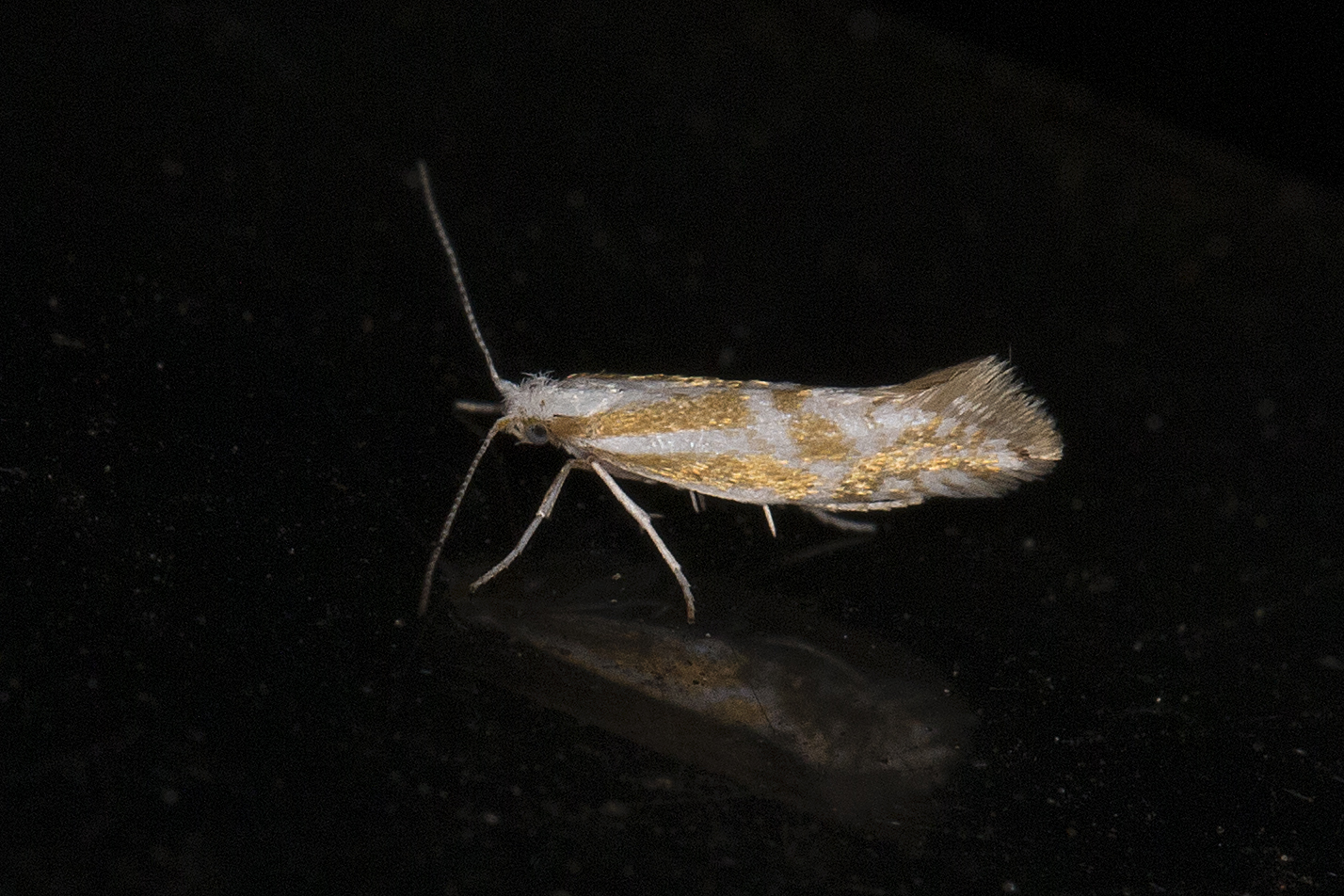

Scientific classification
- Kingdom: Animalia
- Phylum: Arthropoda
- Clade: Pancrustacea
- Class: Insecta
- Order: Lepidoptera
- Family: Argyresthiidae
- Genus: Argyresthia
- Species: A. abdominalis

Binomial name
- Argyresthia abdominalis Zeller, 1839

Synonyms
- Argyresthia helvetica Heinemann, 1877

= Argyresthia abdominalis =

Species of moth

Argyresthia abdominalis is a moth of the family Yponomeutidae. It is found in most of Europe, except Ireland, the Iberian Peninsula, Slovenia, Greece, Ukraine and Lithuania.

The wingspan is 7–9 mm.

The larvae feed on Juniperus communis.
