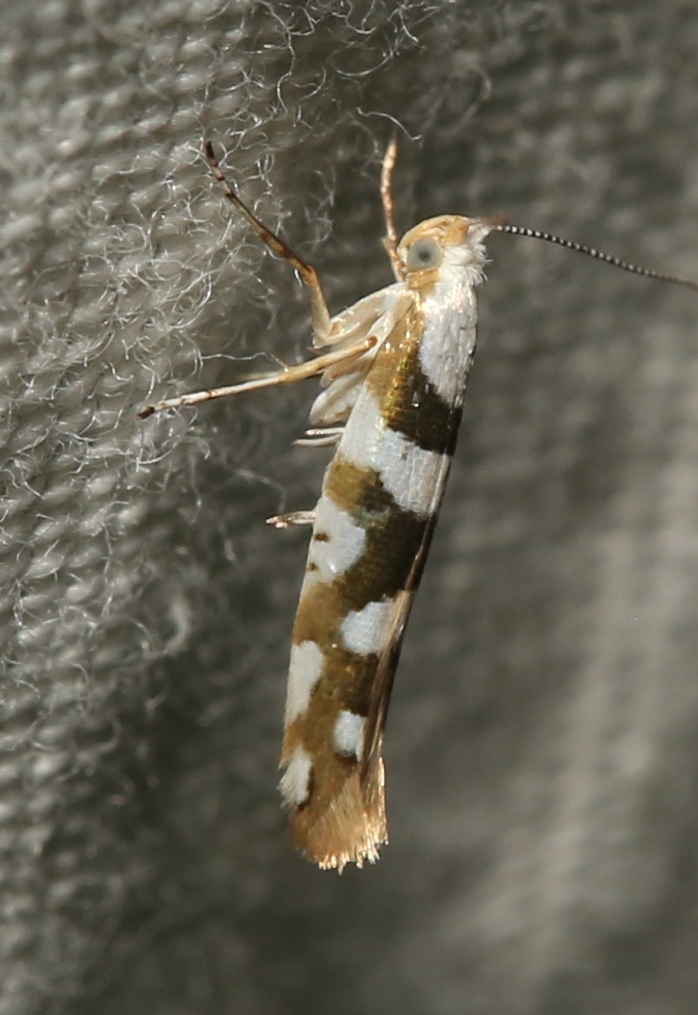

Scientific classification
- Kingdom: Animalia
- Phylum: Arthropoda
- Clade: Pancrustacea
- Class: Insecta
- Order: Lepidoptera
- Family: Argyresthiidae
- Genus: Argyresthia
- Species: A. calliphanes

Binomial name
- Argyresthia calliphanes Meyrick, 1913

= Argyresthia calliphanes =

Species of moth

Argyresthia calliphanes is a moth of the family Yponomeutidae first described by Edward Meyrick in 1913. It is found in Canada from Ontario to British Columbia and possibly in Alberta, Saskatchewan and Manitoba. In the United States, it ranges from New York to California.

The wingspan is 13–14 mm. Adults are on wing from June to August.

The larvae feed on Alnus species.
