= Argyresthia apicimaculella =

Scientific classification
- Kingdom: Animalia
- Phylum: Arthropoda
- Clade: Pancrustacea
- Class: Insecta
- Order: Lepidoptera
- Family: Argyresthiidae
- Genus: Argyresthia
- Species: A. apicimaculella

Binomial name
- Argyresthia apicimaculella Chambers, 1874

Synonyms
- Argyresthia risaliella Chambers, 1875

Species of moth

Argyresthia apicimaculella is a moth of the family Yponomeutidae. It is found in North America, including Florida, Kentucky and Ohio.

The wingspan is about 10 mm. The forewings have a blackish or dark-brown, shining, almost triangular spot at the apex and three pale and indistinct brownish costal streaks before it. There is also a bright pale golden basal streak just within the costal margin.

Adults have been observed in oak woods in June and July. It is thought the larvae feed on Quercus species.
