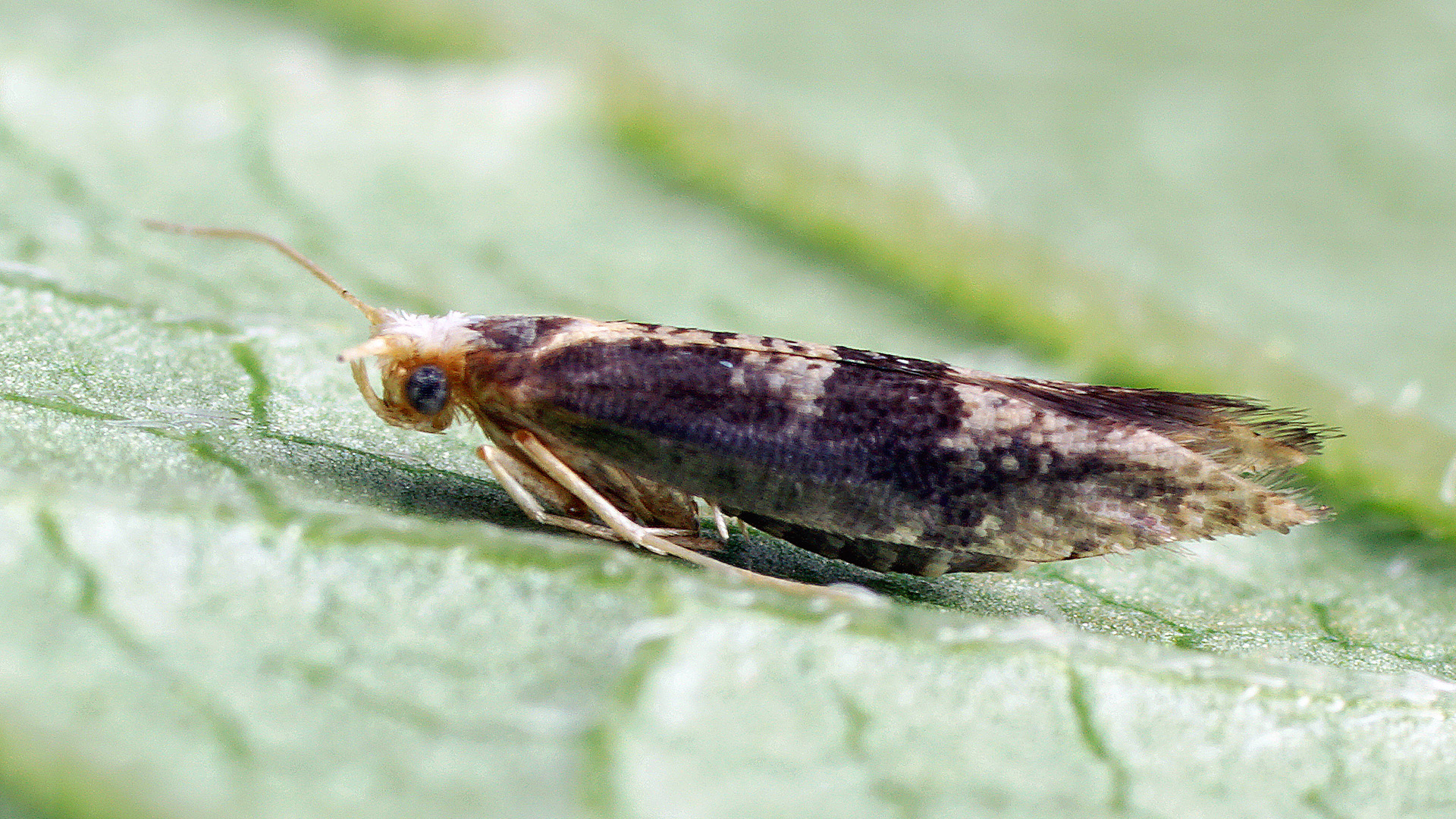
- Argyresthia glaucinella Moscow Oblast

Scientific classification
- Kingdom: Animalia
- Phylum: Arthropoda
- Clade: Pancrustacea
- Class: Insecta
- Order: Lepidoptera
- Family: Argyresthiidae
- Genus: Argyresthia
- Species: A. glaucinella

Binomial name
- Argyresthia glaucinella Zeller, 1839

= Argyresthia glaucinella =

Species of moth

Argyresthia glaucinella is a moth of the family Yponomeutidae. It is found in Europe.

The wingspan is about 9 mm. The head is yellowish-white. Forewings are brassy-fuscous; a whitish dorsal streak, strigulated with dark fuscous; a thick median fascia and apical patch darker fuscous, with bluish reflections, separated by whitish irroration. Hindwings are grey.

Adults are on wing from June to July depending on the location.

The larvae feed on Quercus, Aesculus hippocastanum and Betula.
