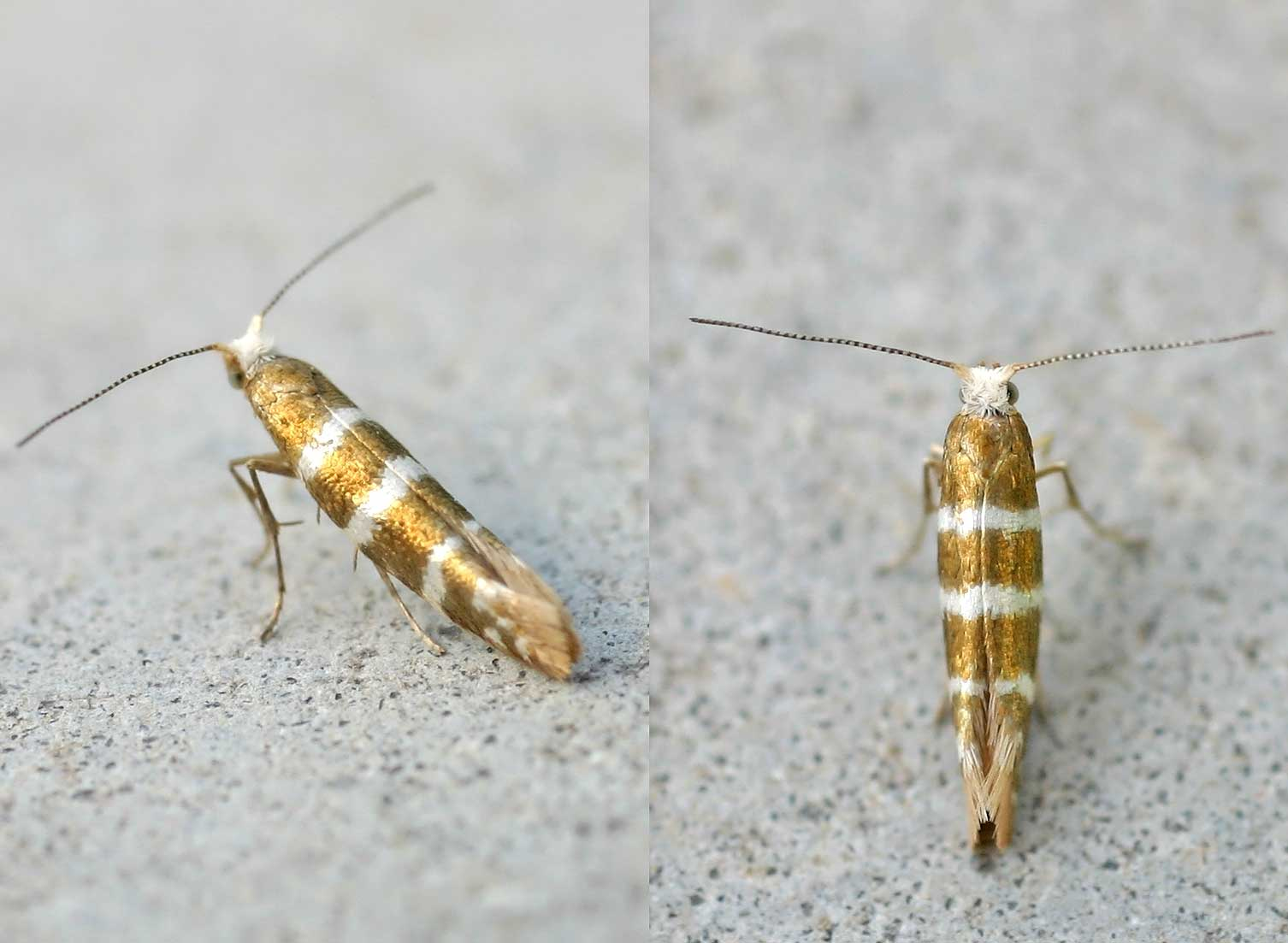

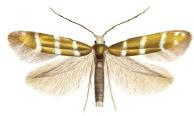

Scientific classification
- Kingdom: Animalia
- Phylum: Arthropoda
- Clade: Pancrustacea
- Class: Insecta
- Order: Lepidoptera
- Family: Argyresthiidae
- Genus: Argyresthia
- Species: A. trifasciata

Binomial name
- Argyresthia trifasciata Staudinger, 1871

Synonyms
- Argyresthia (Blastotere) trifasciata

= Argyresthia trifasciata =

Species of moth

Argyresthia trifasciata, the juniper ermine moth, is a moth of the family Yponomeutidae. It is found in great parts of Europe, but originates from the Alps. The forewings are shiny golden-brown with 3 silver-white transverse bands The moth flies from May to September..

The larvae feed on Juniperus communis, Thuja, Chamaecyparis and Leylandcipres.

== Notes ==
1. The flight season refers to Belgium and The Netherlands. This may vary in other parts of the range.
