= Argyresthia thuriferana =

Scientific classification
- Kingdom: Animalia
- Phylum: Arthropoda
- Clade: Pancrustacea
- Class: Insecta
- Order: Lepidoptera
- Family: Argyresthiidae
- Genus: Argyresthia
- Species: A. thuriferana

Binomial name
- Argyresthia thuriferana Gibeaux, 1992

Synonyms
- Argyresthia (Blastotere) thuriferana

Species of moth

Argyresthia thuriferana is a moth of the family Yponomeutidae. It is found in France.
