= Argyresthia franciscella =

Scientific classification
- Kingdom: Animalia
- Phylum: Arthropoda
- Clade: Pancrustacea
- Class: Insecta
- Order: Lepidoptera
- Family: Argyresthiidae
- Genus: Argyresthia
- Species: A. franciscella

Binomial name
- Argyresthia franciscella Busck, 1915

Species of moth

Argyresthia franciscella is a moth of the family Yponomeutidae. It is found in North America, including California.

There is one generation per year.

The larvae feed on Cupressus species, including Cupressus macrocarpa. They mine growing tips of their host plant.
