= Argyresthia nymphocoma =

Scientific classification
- Kingdom: Animalia
- Phylum: Arthropoda
- Clade: Pancrustacea
- Class: Insecta
- Order: Lepidoptera
- Family: Argyresthiidae
- Genus: Argyresthia
- Species: A. nymphocoma

Binomial name
- Argyresthia nymphocoma Meyrick, 1919

Species of moth

Argyresthia nymphocoma is a moth of the family Yponomeutidae. It is found in North America.
