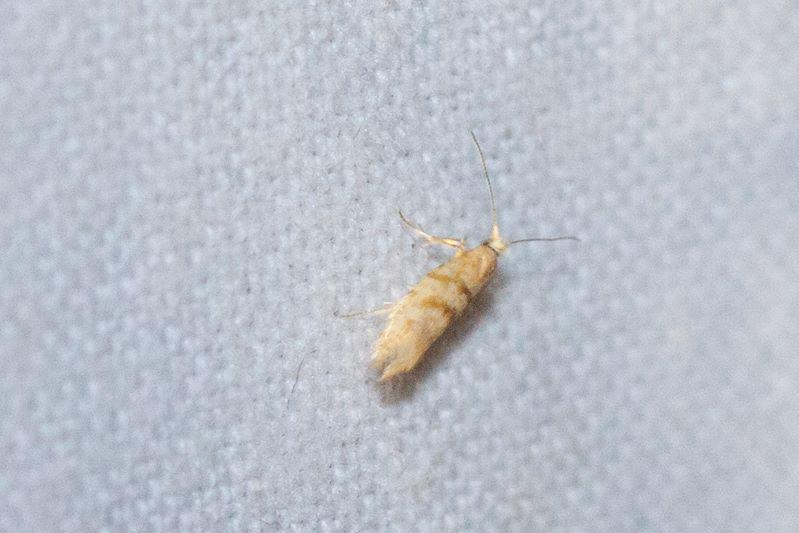

Scientific classification
- Kingdom: Animalia
- Phylum: Arthropoda
- Clade: Pancrustacea
- Class: Insecta
- Order: Lepidoptera
- Family: Argyresthiidae
- Genus: Argyresthia
- Species: A. reticulata

Binomial name
- Argyresthia reticulata Staudinger, 1877

Synonyms
- Argyresthia (Blastotere) reticulata; Argyresthia marmorata Frey, 1880

= Argyresthia reticulata =

Species of moth

Argyresthia reticulata is a moth of the family Yponomeutidae. It is found in the Netherlands, France, Switzerland and the Czech Republic. It is an introduced species in Belgium.

The wingspan is 7–10 mm. Adults are on wing from late April to mid-June.

The larvae feed on Juniperus species.
