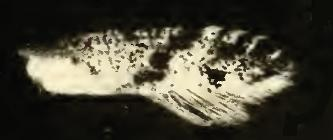
- Wing

Scientific classification
- Kingdom: Animalia
- Phylum: Arthropoda
- Clade: Pancrustacea
- Class: Insecta
- Order: Lepidoptera
- Family: Argyresthiidae
- Genus: Argyresthia
- Species: A. undulatella

Binomial name
- Argyresthia undulatella Chambers, 1874

= Argyresthia undulatella =

Species of moth

Argyresthia undulatella is a moth of the family Yponomeutidae. It is found in North America, including Kentucky and Ohio.

The wingspan is about 9 mm.

The larvae feed on Ulmus species, including Ulmus fulva and Ulmus rubra.
