= Argyresthia tarmanni =

Scientific classification
- Kingdom: Animalia
- Phylum: Arthropoda
- Clade: Pancrustacea
- Class: Insecta
- Order: Lepidoptera
- Family: Argyresthiidae
- Genus: Argyresthia
- Species: A. tarmanni

Binomial name
- Argyresthia tarmanni Gibeaux, 1993

Species of moth

Argyresthia tarmanni is a moth of the family Yponomeutidae. It is found in Austria.
