= Argyresthia laricella =

Scientific classification
- Kingdom: Animalia
- Phylum: Arthropoda
- Clade: Pancrustacea
- Class: Insecta
- Order: Lepidoptera
- Family: Argyresthiidae
- Genus: Argyresthia
- Species: A. laricella

Binomial name
- Argyresthia laricella Kearfott, 1908

Species of moth

Argyresthia laricella, the larch shoot moth, is a moth of the family Yponomeutidae. The species was first described by William D. Kearfott in 1908. It is found in Canada, including north-western Ontario, Nova Scotia, south-eastern Manitoba, Saskatchewan, western Alberta and southern British Columbia.

The wingspan is 11–12 mm. Adults are on wing from the end of June to mid-July.

The larvae feed on Larix species (including L. decidua, L. kaempferi, L. laricina and L. occidentalis) and Picea glauca.
