= Argyresthia tsuga =

Scientific classification
- Kingdom: Animalia
- Phylum: Arthropoda
- Clade: Pancrustacea
- Class: Insecta
- Order: Lepidoptera
- Family: Argyresthiidae
- Genus: Argyresthia
- Species: A. tsuga

Binomial name
- Argyresthia tsuga Freeman, 1972

Species of moth

Argyresthia tsuga is a moth of the family Yponomeutidae. It is found in North America, including British Columbia.

The larvae feed on Tsuga heterophylla.
