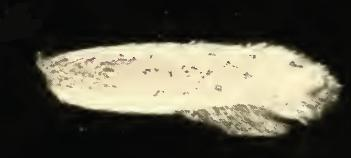
- Wing

Scientific classification
- Kingdom: Animalia
- Phylum: Arthropoda
- Clade: Pancrustacea
- Class: Insecta
- Order: Lepidoptera
- Family: Argyresthiidae
- Genus: Argyresthia
- Species: A. plicipunctella

Binomial name
- Argyresthia plicipunctella Walsingham, 1890

= Argyresthia plicipunctella =

Species of moth

Argyresthia plicipunctella is a species of moth of the family Yponomeutidae. It is found in North America, including California and Oregon.

The wingspan is about 10 mm. The forewings are white, suffused and sprinkled with greyish brown, especially in the costal and apical parts, while the dorsal part below the fold is nearly pure white. The hindwings are light ochreous fuscous.
