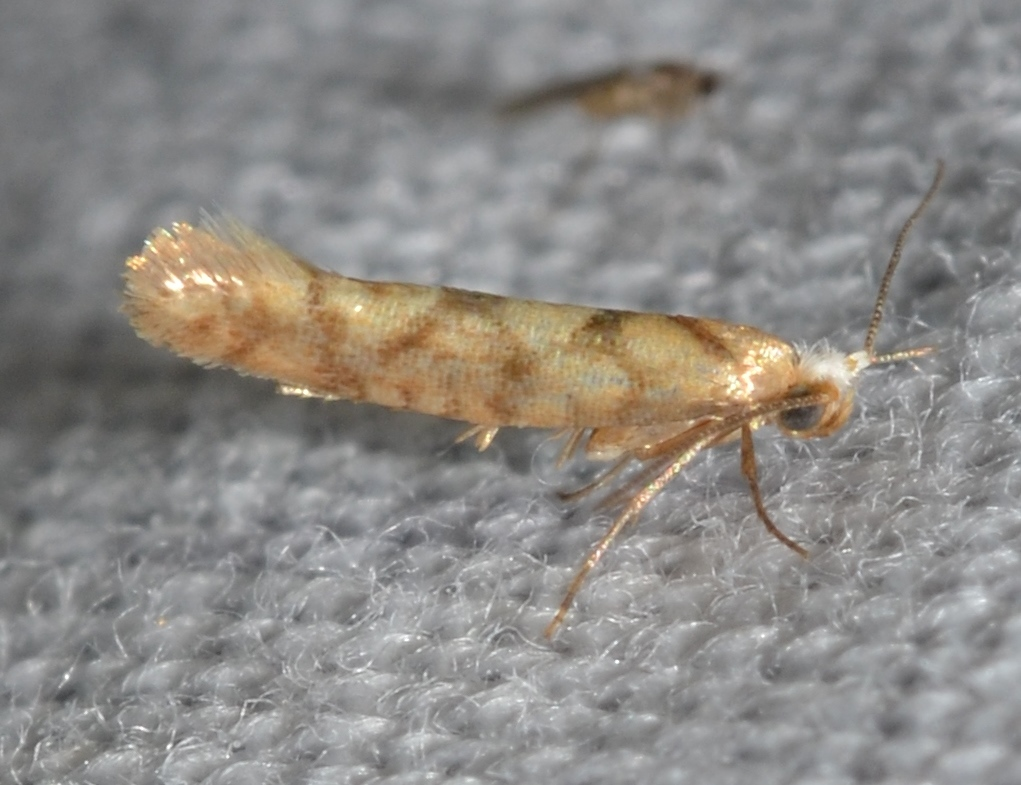

Scientific classification
- Kingdom: Animalia
- Phylum: Arthropoda
- Clade: Pancrustacea
- Class: Insecta
- Order: Lepidoptera
- Family: Argyresthiidae
- Genus: Argyresthia
- Species: A. alternatella

Binomial name
- Argyresthia alternatella Kearfott, 1908

= Argyresthia alternatella =

Species of moth

Argyresthia alternatella is a moth of the family Yponomeutidae. It is found in North America, including Arkansas, Kentucky, Maryland, Massachusetts, Mississippi, New Jersey, Ohio, Oklahoma, Ontario, Quebec and Texas.

The wingspan is 10–12 mm. The forewings are golden-ochreous. There are five brown spots on the costa and three similar spots on the dorsal margin. There is also a streak of brown on the dorsum at the base and the apex of the wing is lightly reticulated with this colour. The hindwings are light fuscous.

The larvae feed on Juniperus species.
