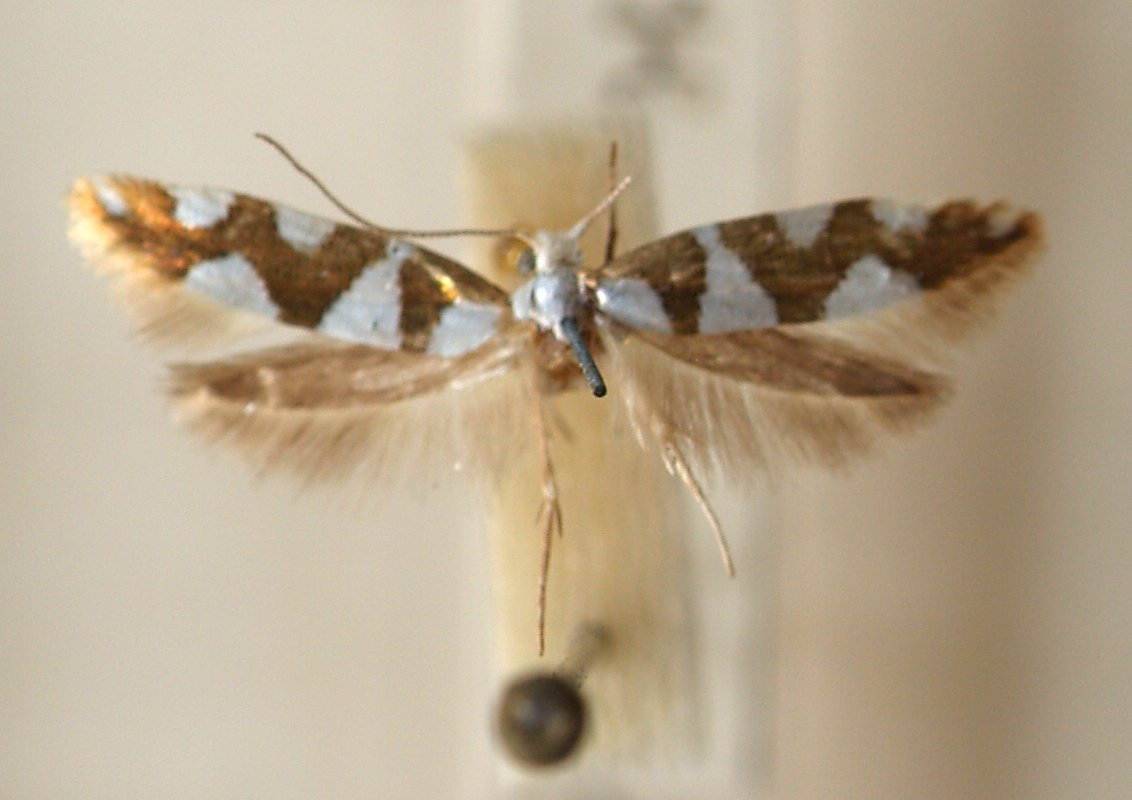

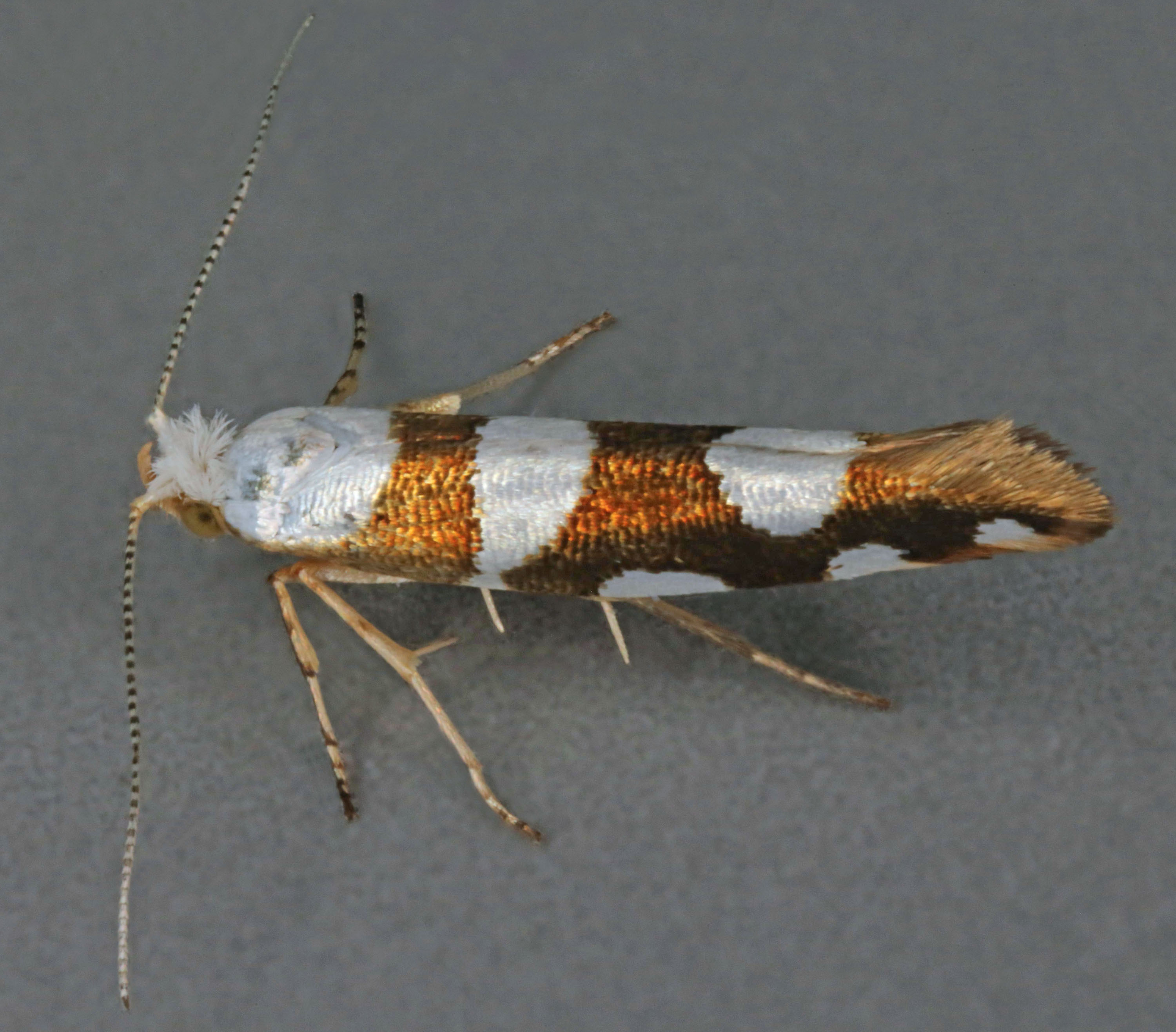
- Argyresthia brockeella, Trawscoed, North Wales

Scientific classification
- Kingdom: Animalia
- Phylum: Arthropoda
- Clade: Pancrustacea
- Class: Insecta
- Order: Lepidoptera
- Family: Argyresthiidae
- Genus: Argyresthia
- Species: A. brockeella

Binomial name
- Argyresthia brockeella (Hübner, 1813)

Synonyms
- Tinea brockeella Hübner, 1813; Argyresthia (Argyresthia) brockeella; Tinea aurivittella Haworth, 1828; Oecophora debrockeella Duponchel, 1838

= Argyresthia brockeella =

Species of moth

Argyresthia brockeella is a moth of the family Yponomeutidae. It is found in Europe, east Siberia and Japan. The wingspan is 9–12 mm. The head and thorax are white. Forewings are deep coppery-golden; a spot on base of dorsum, a fascia at 1/3, three posterior semioval costal spots and a larger tornal spot shining white; sometimes the fascia is connected with adjacent costal and dorsal spots. Hindwings are grey. The larva is pinkish-brown; head brown; plate of 2 partly blackish-edged.

The moth flies from May to September.. The larvae feed on the catkins of birch (Betula spp) and alder (Alnus glutinosa).

== Notes ==
1. The flight season refers to Belgium and The Netherlands. This may vary in other parts of the range.
