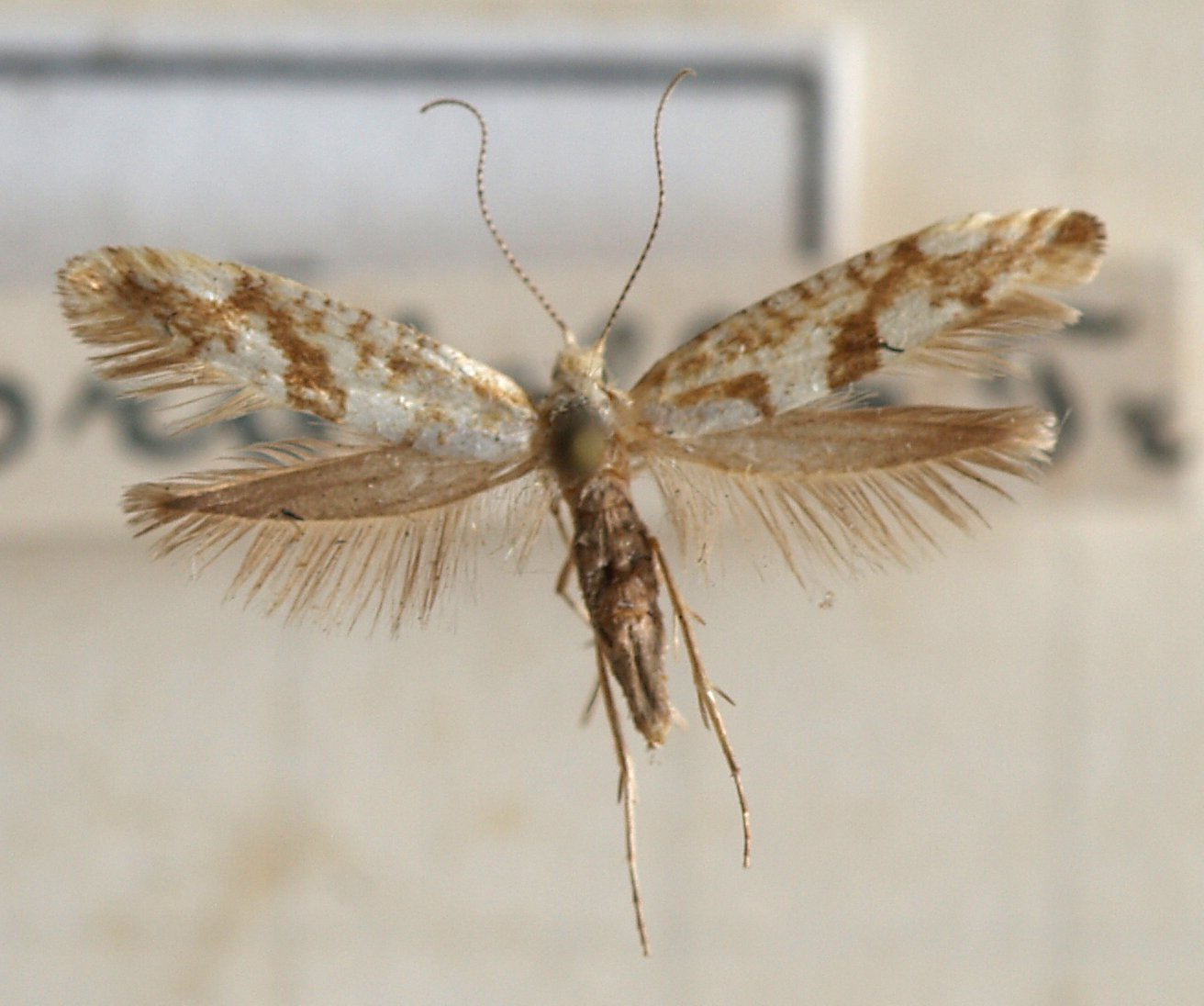

Scientific classification
- Kingdom: Animalia
- Phylum: Arthropoda
- Clade: Pancrustacea
- Class: Insecta
- Order: Lepidoptera
- Family: Argyresthiidae
- Genus: Argyresthia
- Species: A. sorbiella

Binomial name
- Argyresthia sorbiella (Treitschke, 1833)

Synonyms
- Oecophora sorbiella Treitschke, 1833; Argyresthia (Argyresthia) sorbiella

= Argyresthia sorbiella =

Species of moth

Argyresthia sorbiella is a moth of the family Yponomeutidae. It is found in Northern Europe and Central Europe.

The wingspan is 11–13 mm (0.43–0.51 in).The head and thorax are whitish. Forewings are shining whitish, on costal half strigulated with light golden-brown; a transverse dorsal mark at 1/3, an outwardly oblique streak from middle of dorsum, and an indistinct tornal mark golden-brown. Hindwings are grey.

The moth flies from May to August.

The larvae feed on Sorbus aucuparia and Sorbus aria.

== Notes ==
1. The flight season refers to Belgium and The Netherlands. This may vary in other parts of the range.
