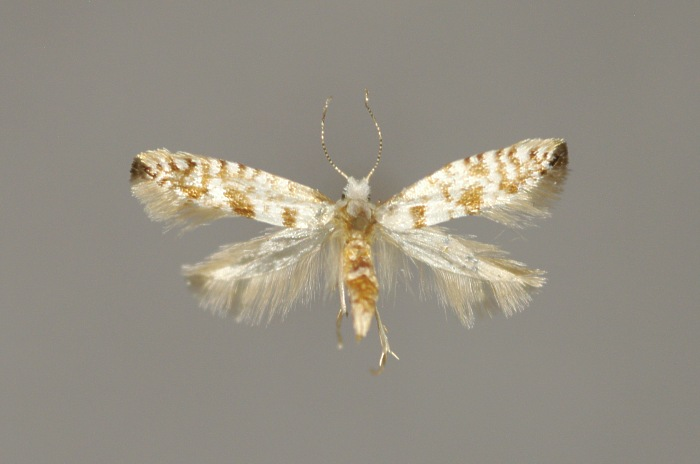

Scientific classification
- Kingdom: Animalia
- Phylum: Arthropoda
- Clade: Pancrustacea
- Class: Insecta
- Order: Lepidoptera
- Family: Argyresthiidae
- Genus: Argyresthia
- Species: A. fundella

Binomial name
- Argyresthia fundella (Fischer von Röslerstamm, 1835)

Synonyms
- Oecophora fundella Fischer von Röslerstamm, 1835

= Argyresthia fundella =

Species of moth

Argyresthia fundella is a moth of the family Yponomeutidae. It is found in most of Europe, except Ireland, Great Britain, the Iberian Peninsula, Finland, the Baltic region, Slovenia, Hungary and Greece.

The wingspan is 9–10 mm.

The larvae feed on Abies alba, Abies balsamea, Abies concolor, Abies grandis, Abies nordmanniana and Abies numidica. They mine the leaves of their host plant. This hole is closed with silk. A single larva creates mines in several leaves before overwintering inside the mine. The larvae have a dirty dark green body and a black head. They can be found from late summer to April.
