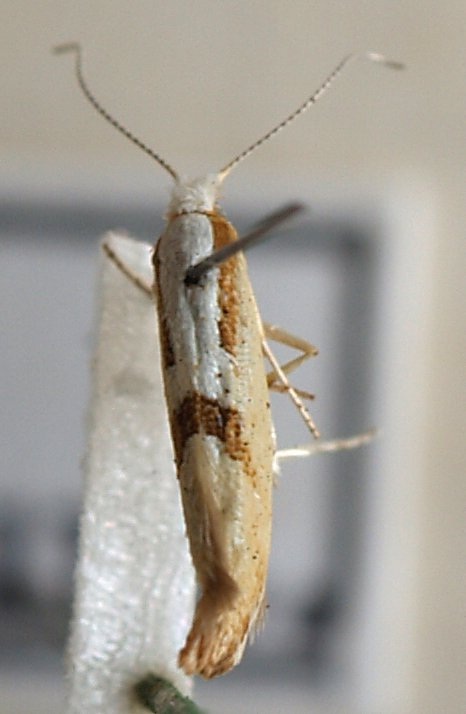
- Argyresthia semitestacella

Scientific classification
- Kingdom: Animalia
- Phylum: Arthropoda
- Class: Insecta
- Order: Lepidoptera
- Family: Argyresthiidae
- Subfamily: Argyresthiinae
- Genus: Argyresthia; Hübner, 1825

Synonyms
- Paraargyresthia Moriuti, 1969; Blastotere Ratzeburg 1840; Argyrosetia Stephens, 1829; Oligos Treitschke, 1830; Ederesa Curtis, 1833; Ismene Stephens, 1834 (Preocc.); Eurynome Chambers, 1875 (Preocc.); Busckia Dyar, 1903

= Argyresthia =

Genus of moths

Argyresthia is a genus of moths in the family Argyresthiidae, previously treated as subfamily Argyresthiinae in the family Yponomeutidae. It is composed of over 200 species, over 100 of which are recognized across the Palearctic region. Species in the Neotropical realm have been less comprehensively described than other species.

== Species ==
These species belong to the genus Argyresthia:

- Argyresthia abdominalis Zeller, 1839
- Argyresthia abies Freeman, 1972
- Argyresthia acuminata Liu, Wang & Li, 2017
- Argyresthia affinicineretra Liu, Wang & Li, 2017
- Argyresthia affinis Braun, 1940
- Argyresthia albaureola Liu, Wang & Li, 2017
- Argyresthia albicomella Moriuti, 1969
- Argyresthia albistria (Haworth, 1828)
- Argyresthia alpha Friese & Moriuti, 1968
- Argyresthia alternatella Kearfott, 1908
- Argyresthia altissimella Chambers, 1877
- Argyresthia amiantella (Zeller, 1847)
- Argyresthia andrianella Gibeaux, 1983
- Argyresthia angusta Moriuti, 1969
- Argyresthia annettella Busck, 1907
- Argyresthia anthocephala Meyrick, 1936
- Argyresthia aphoristis Meyrick, 1938
- Argyresthia apicimaculella Chambers, 1874
- Argyresthia arceuthina Zeller, 1839
- Argyresthia arceuthobiella Busck, 1917
- Argyresthia assimilis Moriuti, 1977
- Argyresthia atlanticella Rebel, 1940
- Argyresthia atomata Liu, Wang & Li, 2017
- Argyresthia aureoargentella Brower, 1953
- Argyresthia aureola Liu, Wang & Li, 2017
- Argyresthia aurilata Liu, Wang & Li, 2017
- Argyresthia aurulentella Stainton, 1849
- Argyresthia austerella Zeller, 1873
- Argyresthia basistriata Liu, Wang & Li, 2017
- Argyresthia belangerella Chambers, 1875
- Argyresthia bergiella (Ratzeburg, 1840)
- Argyresthia beta Friese & Moriuti, 1968
- Argyresthia biloba Liu, Wang & Li, 2017
- Argyresthia biruptella Zeller, 1877
- Argyresthia bobyella Gibeaux, 1983
- Argyresthia bolliella Busck, 1907
- Argyresthia bonnetella (Linnaeus, 1758)
- Argyresthia brevalbella Lee, Lee & Liu, 2023
- Argyresthia brockeella (Hübner, 1805)
- Argyresthia brumella Pérez Santa-Rita, Baixeras & Karsholt, 2020
- Argyresthia buvati Gibeaux, 1993
- Argyresthia calliphanes Meyrick, 1913
- Argyresthia campylotropa Liu, Wang & Li, 2017
- Argyresthia canadensis Freeman, 1972 - Canadian arborvitae leafminer
- Argyresthia carcinomatella Zeller, 1877
- Argyresthia cardiopetala Liu, Wang & Li, 2017
- † Argyresthia castaneella Busck, 1915 - chestnut ermine moth
- Argyresthia chalcocausta Meyrick, 1935
- Argyresthia chalcochrysa Meyrick, 1918
- Argyresthia chalybaeella (Costa, 1836)
- Argyresthia chamaecypariae Moriuti, 1965
- Argyresthia chionochrysa Meyrick, 1931
- Argyresthia chiotorna Liu, Wang & Li, 2017
- Argyresthia chlorella Liu, Wang & Li, 2017
- Argyresthia chrysidella Peyerimhoff, 1877
- Argyresthia cineretra Liu, Wang & Li, 2017
- Argyresthia columbia Freeman, 1972
- Argyresthia communana Moriuti, 1969
- Argyresthia conjugella Zeller, 1839 - apple fruit moth
- Argyresthia conspersa Butler, 1883
- Argyresthia convexa Liu, Wang & Li, 2017
- Argyresthia cuprea Liu, Wang & Li, 2017
- Argyresthia cupressella Walsingham, 1890
- Argyresthia curvativa Liu, Wang & Li, 2017
- Argyresthia curvella (Linnaeus, 1761)
- Argyresthia cyaneimarmorella Millière, 1854
- Argyresthia decurtata Liu, Wang & Li, 2017
- Argyresthia deletella Zeller, 1873
- Argyresthia densa Liu, Wang & Li, 2017
- Argyresthia diffractella Zeller, 1877
- Argyresthia dilectella Zeller, 1874
- Argyresthia dislocata Meyrick, 1914
- Argyresthia dolichocoremata Liu, Wang & Li, 2017
- Argyresthia ellipsoidea Liu, Wang & Li, 2017
- Argyresthia eugeniella Busck, 1917
- Argyresthia festiva Moriuti, 1969
- Argyresthia flavicomans Moriuti, 1969
- Argyresthia flavifusca Liu, Wang & Li, 2017
- Argyresthia flavipes Gibeaux, 1983
- Argyresthia flexilis Freeman, 1961
- Argyresthia franciscella Busck, 1915
- Argyresthia freyella Walsingham, 1890
- Argyresthia friulii Huemer, 2009
- Argyresthia fujiyamae Moriuti, 1969
- Argyresthia fundella (Fischer von Röslerstamm, 1834)
- Argyresthia furcatella Busck, 1917
- Argyresthia gephyritis Meyrick, 1938
- Argyresthia glabratella (Zeller, 1847)
- Argyresthia glaucinella Zeller, 1839
- Argyresthia goedartella (Linnaeus, 1758)
- Argyresthia grammosacca Liu, Wang & Li, 2017
- Argyresthia guatemala Gorneau & Dombroskie, 2023
- Argyresthia hilfiella Rebel, 1910
- Argyresthia hirsuta Liu, Wang & Li, 2017
- Argyresthia huguenini Frey, 1882
- Argyresthia icterias Meyrick, 1907
- Argyresthia idiograpta Meyrick, 1935
- Argyresthia illuminatella Zeller, 1839
- Argyresthia impura (Staudinger, 1880)
- Argyresthia inexpectella Gibeaux, 1983
- Argyresthia inscriptella Busck, 1907
- Argyresthia iopleura Meyrick, 1918
- Argyresthia iridescentia Gorneau & Dombroskie, 2023
- Argyresthia italaviana Gibeaux, 1983
- Argyresthia ivella (Haworth, 1828)
- Argyresthia japonica (Moriuti, 1969)
- Argyresthia juniperivorella Kuznetzov, 1958
- Argyresthia kaoyaiensis Moriuti, 1982
- Argyresthia kasyi Friese, 1963
- Argyresthia kulfani Bengtsson & Johansson, 2011
- Argyresthia kurenzovi Gershenson, 1988
- Argyresthia laevigatella (Herrich-Schäffer, 1855)
- Argyresthia lamiella Bradley, 1965
- Argyresthia lanosa Liu, Wang & Li, 2017
- Argyresthia laricella Kearfott, 1908
- Argyresthia lata Liu, Wang & Li, 2017
- Argyresthia leuculias Meyrick
- Argyresthia libocedrella Busck, 1917
- Argyresthia liparodes Meyrick, 1914
- Argyresthia longa Liu, Wang & Li, 2017
- Argyresthia longalbella Liu, Wang & Li, 2017
- Argyresthia longipennella Liu, Wang & Li, 2017
- Argyresthia lustralis Meyrick, 1911
- Argyresthia luteella (Chambers, 1875)
- Argyresthia magna Moriuti, 1969
- Argyresthia magnificella Karisch, 2002
- Argyresthia mala Liu, Wang & Li, 2017
- Argyresthia mariana Freeman, 1972
- Argyresthia media Braun, 1914
- Argyresthia melitaula Meyrick, 1918
- Argyresthia mesocausta Meyrick, 1913
- Argyresthia metallicolor Moriuti, 1969
- Argyresthia minutilepidota Liu, Wang & Li, 2017
- Argyresthia minutisocia Liu, Wang & Li, 2017
- Argyresthia mirabiella Toll, 1948
- Argyresthia monochromella Busck, 1922
- Argyresthia montana Fissetchko, 1970
- Argyresthia montella Chambers, 1877
- Argyresthia nemorivaga Moriuti, 1969
- Argyresthia niphospora Meyrick, 1938
- Argyresthia nivifraga Diakonoff, 1955
- Argyresthia notoleuca (Turner, 1913)
- Argyresthia nymphocoma Meyrick, 1919
- Argyresthia ochridorsis Zeller, 1877
- Argyresthia oreasella Clemens, 1860
- Argyresthia ornatipennella Moriuti, 1974
- Argyresthia orthocera Liu, Wang & Li, 2017
- Argyresthia pallidella Braun, 1918
- Argyresthia papillata Liu, Wang & Li, 2017
- Argyresthia pedmontella Chambers, 1877
- Argyresthia pentanoma Meyrick, 1913
- Argyresthia perbella Moriuti, 1969
- Argyresthia percussella Zeller, 1877
- Argyresthia perezi Vives Moreno, 2001
- Argyresthia picea Freeman, 1972
- Argyresthia pilatella Braun, 1910
- Argyresthia plectrodes Meyrick, 1913
- Argyresthia plicipunctella Walsingham, 1890
- Argyresthia praecocella Zeller, 1839
- Argyresthia prenjella Rebel, 1901
- Argyresthia pretiosa Staudinger, 1880
- Argyresthia pruniella (Clerck, 1759) - cherry blossom tineid
- Argyresthia psamminopa Meyrick, 1932
- Argyresthia pseudotsuga Freeman, 1972
- Argyresthia pulchella Lienig & Zeller, 1846
- Argyresthia pumilella Gibeaux, 1983
- Argyresthia punctireticulata Liu, Wang & Li, 2017
- Argyresthia punctuata Liu, Wang & Li, 2017
- Argyresthia purella Chrétien, 1908
- Argyresthia pusiella Gibeaux, 1983
- Argyresthia pygmaeella (Denis & Schiffermüller, 1775)
- Argyresthia quadristrigella Zeller, 1873
- Argyresthia quercicolella Chambers, 1877
- Argyresthia quetzaltenangonella Gorneau & Dombroskie, 2023
- Argyresthia rara Moriuti, 1969
- Argyresthia resplenderella Gibeaux, 1983
- Argyresthia reticulata Staudinger, 1877
- Argyresthia retinella Zeller, 1839
- Argyresthia rileiella Busck, 1907
- Argyresthia ruidosa Braun, 1940
- Argyresthia sabinae Moriuti, 1965
- Argyresthia scalprata Liu, Wang & Li, 2017
- Argyresthia semiflavella Christoph, 1882
- Argyresthia semifusca (Haworth, 1828)
- Argyresthia semitestacella (Wood, 1839)
- Argyresthia semitrunca Meyrick, 1907
- Argyresthia sorbiella (Treitschke, 1835)
- Argyresthia spinosella Stainton, 1849
- Argyresthia sporadolepis Liu, Wang & Li, 2017
- Argyresthia stilpnota Meyrick, 1913
- Argyresthia submontana Frey, 1871
- Argyresthia subreticulata Walsingham, 1882
- Argyresthia subrimosa Meyrick, 1932
- Argyresthia subzonata Liu, Wang & Li, 2017
- Argyresthia surrecta Liu, Wang & Li, 2017
- Argyresthia svenssoni Bengtsson & Johansson, 2011
- Argyresthia taiwanensis Friese & Moriuti, 1968
- Argyresthia tallasica Fissetchko, 1970
- Argyresthia tarmanni Gibeaux, 1993
- Argyresthia thoracella Busck, 1907
- Argyresthia thuiella (Packard, 1871) - arborvitae leafminer
- Argyresthia thuriferana (Gibeaux, 1993)
- Argyresthia triangulata Liu, Wang & Li, 2017
- Argyresthia trifasciae Braun, 1910
- Argyresthia trifasciata Staudinger, 1871 - juniper ermine moth
- Argyresthia trigonophylla Liu, Wang & Li, 2017
- Argyresthia tristella Gibeaux, 1983
- Argyresthia trochaula Meyrick, 1938
- Argyresthia tsuga Freeman, 1972
- Argyresthia tutuzicolella Moriuti, 1969
- Argyresthia umbrina Liu, Wang & Li, 2017
- Argyresthia umbrinistrigata Liu, Wang & Li, 2017
- Argyresthia undulatella Chambers, 1874
- Argyresthia uralensis Baraniak & Junnilainen, 2011

The fungus moth Erechthias zebrina was initially assigned to Argyresthia in error.
