= Argyresthia eugeniella =

Guava moth

Scientific classification
- Kingdom: Animalia
- Phylum: Arthropoda
- Clade: Pancrustacea
- Class: Insecta
- Order: Lepidoptera
- Family: Argyresthiidae
- Genus: Argyresthia
- Species: A. eugeniella

Binomial name
- Argyresthia eugeniella Busck, 1917

Species of moth

Argyresthia eugeniella, the guava moth, is a moth found in Florida.

The wingspan is 7–8 mm. The forewings are dark golden brown with a violet sheen and with darker brown transverse reticulation. The hindwings are light silvery fuscous.

Females penetrate guavas and lay their eggs inside the plant. In its larval form it tunnels through the guavas, damaging them.
