= Argyresthia aureoargentella =

Scientific classification
- Kingdom: Animalia
- Phylum: Arthropoda
- Clade: Pancrustacea
- Class: Insecta
- Order: Lepidoptera
- Family: Argyresthiidae
- Genus: Argyresthia
- Species: A. aureoargentella

Binomial name
- Argyresthia aureoargentella Brower, 1953

Species of moth

Argyresthia aureoargentella is a moth of the family Argyresthiidae. It is found in North America, including Ontario and Quebec. They are one of several arborvitae or cedar leafminer moth species damaging eastern white cedar (Thuja occidentalis) in the region, including Argyresthia canadensis, Argyresthia thuiella, and Coleotechnites thujaella.

Adults are whitish. They are on wing from early June to late July. There is one generation per year.
