= Argyresthia canadensis =

Scientific classification
- Kingdom: Animalia
- Phylum: Arthropoda
- Clade: Pancrustacea
- Class: Insecta
- Order: Lepidoptera
- Family: Argyresthiidae
- Genus: Argyresthia
- Species: A. canadensis

Binomial name
- Argyresthia canadensis Freeman, 1972

Species of moth

Argyresthia canadensis, the Canadian arborvitae leafminer or cedar leafminer, is a moth of the family Argyresthiidae. It is found in North America. They are one of several arborvitae or cedar leafminer moth species damaging eastern white cedar (Thuja occidentalis) in the region, including Argyresthia aureoargentella, Argyresthia thuiella, and Coleotechnites thujaella.

There is one generation per year.

The larvae feed on Thuja occidentalis. They have a green body, a dark brown head and a central brown patch on the prothoracic shield and anal plate. They reach a length of up to 7 mm. Nearly full-grown larvae overwinter in mined foliage. Full-grown larvae can be found from April to June. Pupation takes place in a whitish, spindle-shaped cocoon that is made outside of the mine on the foliage.
