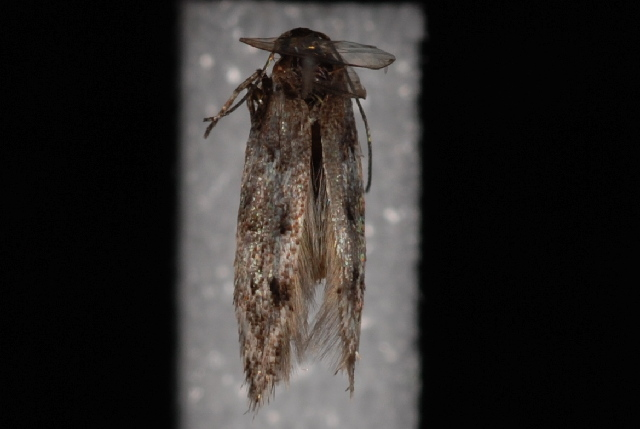

Scientific classification
- Domain: Eukaryota
- Kingdom: Animalia
- Phylum: Arthropoda
- Class: Insecta
- Order: Lepidoptera
- Family: Gelechiidae
- Genus: Coleotechnites
- Species: C. starki

Binomial name
- Coleotechnites starki (Freeman, 1957)

Synonyms
- Recurvaria starki Freeman, 1957

= Coleotechnites starki =

Species of moth

Coleotechnites starki, the northern lodgepole needle miner, is a moth of the family Gelechiidae. It is found in North America, where it has been recorded from Alberta, Arizona, British Columbia, Montana and Florida.

Adults are similar to Coleotechnites milleri. They are on wing from June to August.

The larvae feed on Pinus contorta.
