= C. milleri =

C. milleri may refer to:

- Calliphora milleri, a synonym for Calliphora hilli, a blow fly species
- Candida milleri, a yeast species now known as Candida humilis
- Cochliopina milleri, the Miller's snail, a freshwater snail species endemic to Mexico
- Coleotechnites milleri, the lodgepole needleminer, a moth species found in the United States and Canada
- Cynomps milleri, Miller's dog-faced bat
