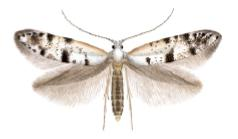

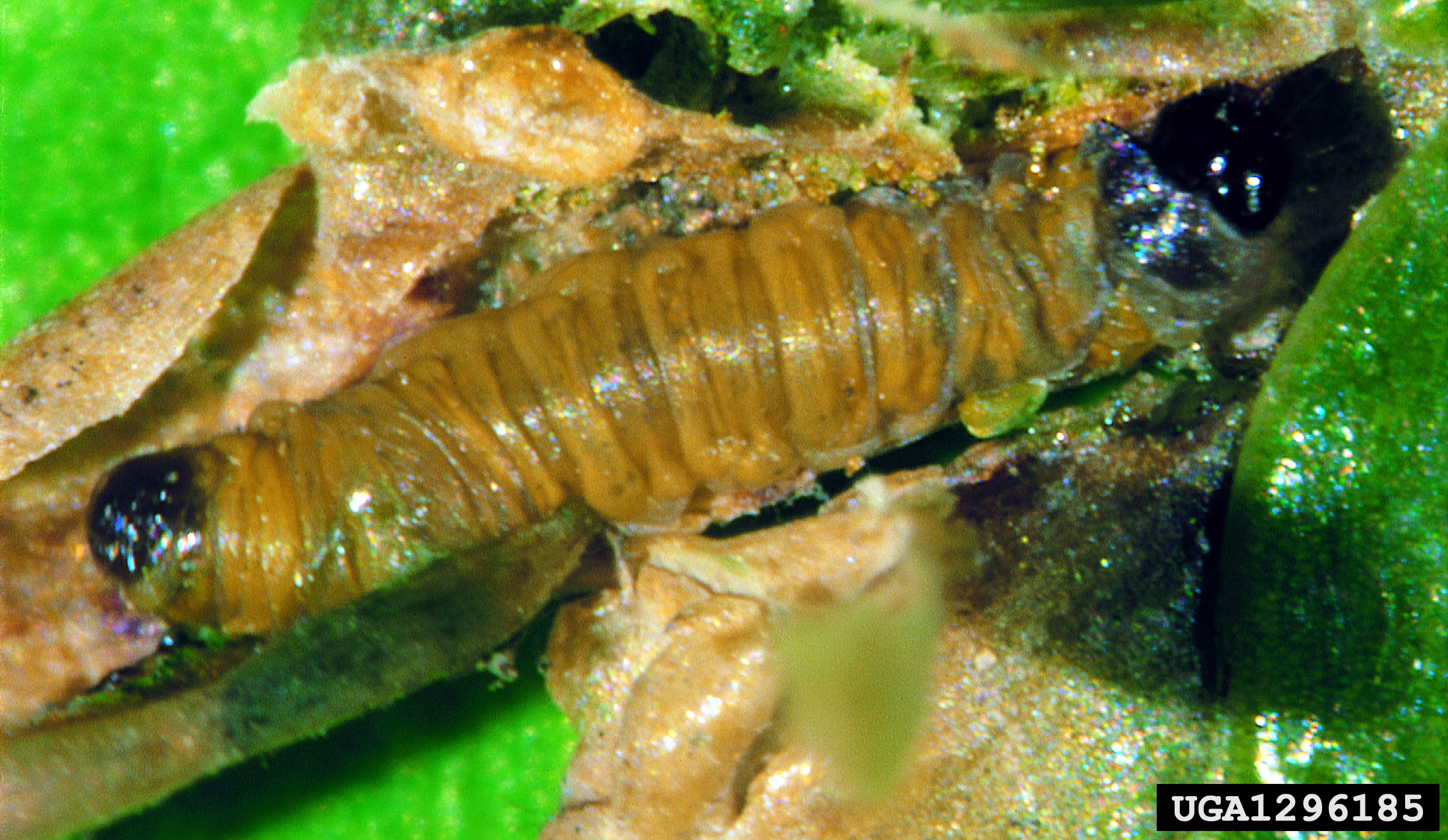

Scientific classification
- Kingdom: Animalia
- Phylum: Arthropoda
- Clade: Pancrustacea
- Class: Insecta
- Order: Lepidoptera
- Family: Argyresthiidae
- Genus: Argyresthia
- Species: A. thuiella

Binomial name
- Argyresthia thuiella (Packard, 1871)

Synonyms
- Bucculatrix thuiella Packard, 1871

= Argyresthia thuiella =

Species of moth

Argyresthia thuiella, the arborvitae leafminer, thuja mining moth or American thuja shoot moth, is a moth of the family Argyresthiidae. It is found in southeastern Canada and the northeastern United States to North Carolina, west to Missouri, north to Manitoba. In Maine, they are one of several arborvitae or cedar leafminer moth species damaging eastern white cedar (Thuja occidentalis) in the region, including Argyresthia aureoargentella, Argyresthia canadensis, and Coleotechnites thujaella. There is also an isolated population in British Columbia. The species is also present in Europe, where it has been introduced on three occasions: to the Netherlands in 1971, Germany in 1975 and Austria in 1976.

The wingspan is about 8 mm. Adults are on wing from May to July depending on the location.

The larvae feed on the leaves of Thuja occidentalis as well as other arborvitae and false cypress (Chamaecyparis) species.

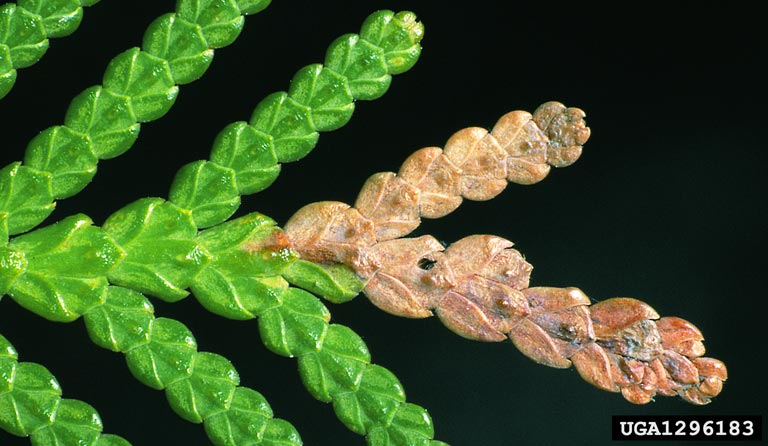
Arborvitae leafminer damage on eastern white cedar.
