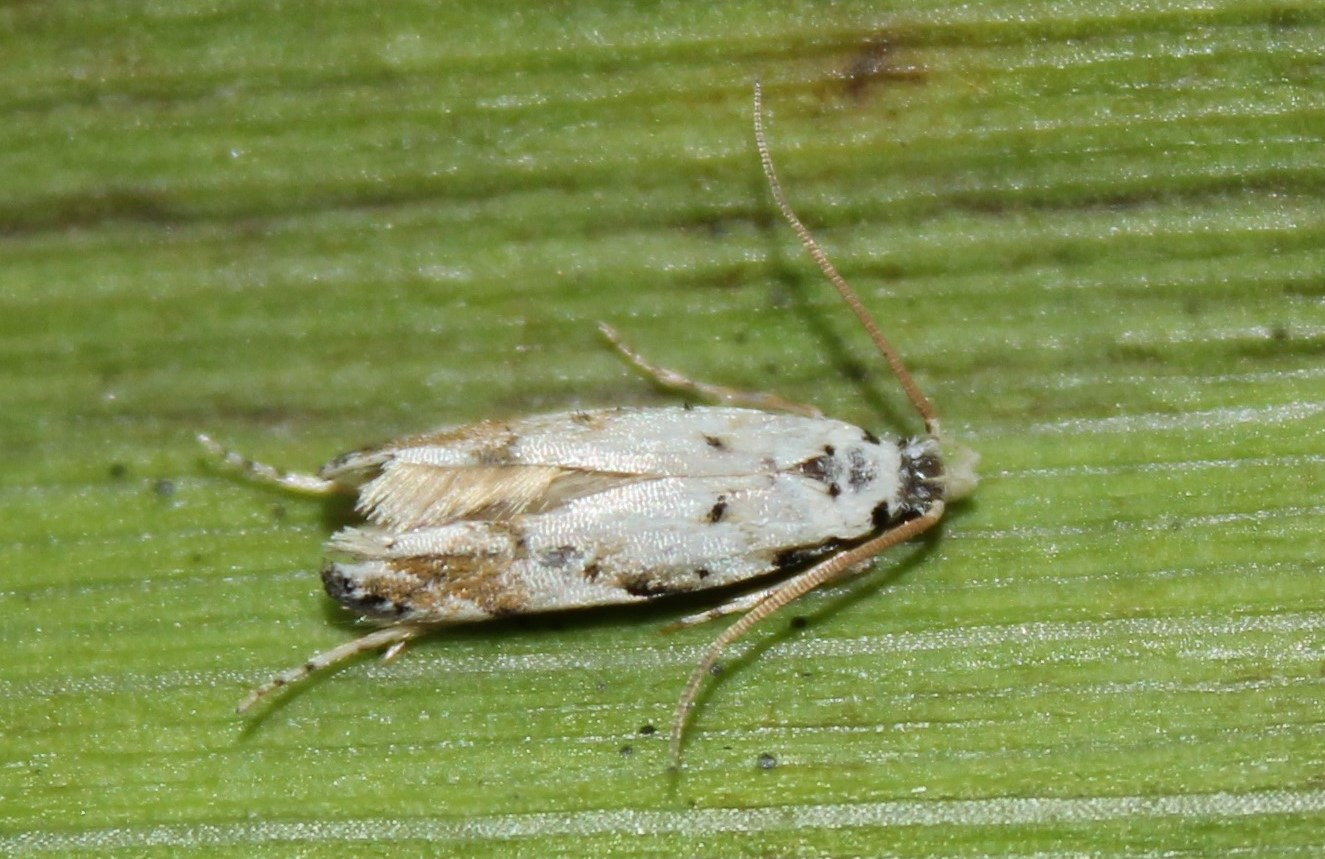

Scientific classification
- Domain: Eukaryota
- Kingdom: Animalia
- Phylum: Arthropoda
- Class: Insecta
- Order: Lepidoptera
- Family: Gelechiidae
- Genus: Coleotechnites
- Species: C. eryngiella

Binomial name
- Coleotechnites eryngiella (Bottimer, 1926)

Synonyms
- Recurvaria eryngiella Bottimer, 1926

= Coleotechnites eryngiella =

Species of moth

Coleotechnites eryngiella is a moth of the family Gelechiidae. It is found in North America, where it has been recorded from Alabama, Florida, Illinois, Indiana, Louisiana, Mississippi, Texas and Wisconsin.

The wingspan is about 15 mm. Adults have been recorded on wing from early April to September, suggesting at least two and possibly multiple generations per year.
