= Coleotechnites vagatioella =

Scientific classification
- Kingdom: Animalia
- Phylum: Arthropoda
- Clade: Pancrustacea
- Class: Insecta
- Order: Lepidoptera
- Family: Gelechiidae
- Genus: Coleotechnites
- Species: C. vagatioella

Binomial name
- Coleotechnites vagatioella (Chambers, 1873)

Synonyms
- Eidothoa vagatioella Chambers, 1873; Gelechia (Teleia) dorsivittella Zeller, 1873

Species of moth

Coleotechnites vagatioella is a moth of the family Gelechiidae. It is found in North America, where it has been recorded from Kentucky and Texas.

The forewings are dark brown faintly dusted with white, with a white dorsal margin, dusted with dark brown, especially towards the apex. There is an irregular indistinct whitish streak on the costa near the base, and a white spot on the extreme costa behind the middle. The white colour prevails in the apical portion of the costal margin, but is dusted with brown, and the apex is white with a rather large dark brown apical spot or patch.
