= Coleotechnites alnifructella =

Scientific classification
- Domain: Eukaryota
- Kingdom: Animalia
- Phylum: Arthropoda
- Class: Insecta
- Order: Lepidoptera
- Family: Gelechiidae
- Genus: Coleotechnites
- Species: C. alnifructella

Binomial name
- Coleotechnites alnifructella (Busck, 1915)

Synonyms
- Recurvaria alnifructella Busck, 1915

Species of moth

Coleotechnites alnifructella is a moth of the family Gelechiidae. It is found in North America, where it has been recorded from Virginia.

The wingspan is about 12 mm. The forewings are black with a white dorsal edge and with an indistinct white, outwardly curved costal streak at the apical fourth and an opposite oblique dorsal white streak limiting the apical area, which is slightly mottled with lighter scales. There are three small black tufts of raised scales on the border of the white dorsal part. The hindwings are silvery fuscous, semitransparent, in the male with a long ochreous expansible hairpencil at the base.

The larvae feed in the catkins of alder and hazel. Full-grown larvae reach a length of about 12 mm. They have a white body and light brown head.
