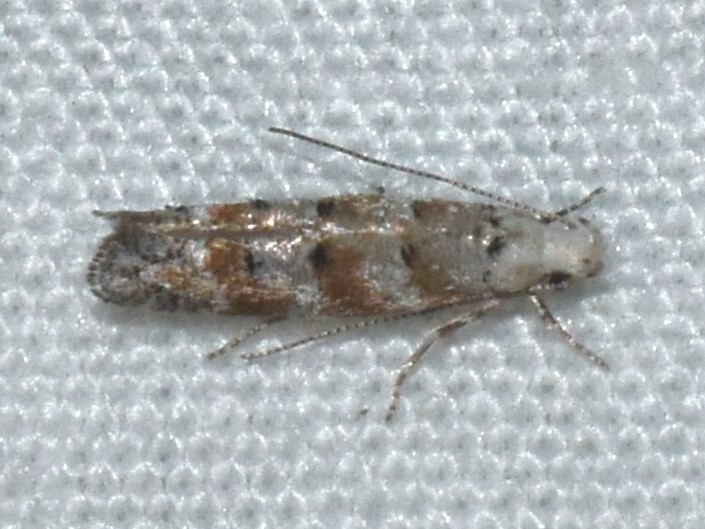

Scientific classification
- Kingdom: Animalia
- Phylum: Arthropoda
- Clade: Pancrustacea
- Class: Insecta
- Order: Lepidoptera
- Family: Gelechiidae
- Genus: Coleotechnites
- Species: C. chillcotti

Binomial name
- Coleotechnites chillcotti (Freeman, 1963)

Synonyms
- Exoteleia chillcotti Freeman, 1963; Coleotechnites chilcotti

= Coleotechnites chillcotti =

Species of moth

Coleotechnites chillcotti is a moth of the family Gelechiidae. It is found in North America, where it has been recorded from Alabama, Louisiana, Maryland, New Jersey, Pennsylvania and South Carolina.

The larvae feed on the needles of Pinus palustris.
