= Coleotechnites gibsonella =

Scientific classification
- Domain: Eukaryota
- Kingdom: Animalia
- Phylum: Arthropoda
- Class: Insecta
- Order: Lepidoptera
- Family: Gelechiidae
- Genus: Coleotechnites
- Species: C. gibsonella

Binomial name
- Coleotechnites gibsonella (Kearfott, 1907)

Synonyms
- Recurvaria gibsonella Kearfott, 1907

Species of moth

Coleotechnites gibsonella (common juniper leafminer) is a moth of the family Gelechiidae. It is found in the north-eastern parts of the United States and Canada. The type specimen was found in Hull, Quebec in 1905 by Arthur Gibson.

The wingspan is about 11 mm. The forewings are white, shaded with yellowish at the apex and crossed by three oblique dark brown bands. The hindwings are yellowish-gray. There is one generation per year.

The larvae feed on Juniperus communis. Young caterpillars mine or hollow the needles of their host at the ends of shoots and tie the dead needles together with silk. In fall, it lines the center of the bundle with silk to make a chamber where it spends the winter. In spring, the caterpillar moves to new terminal growth, again binding hollowed needles together with silk.
