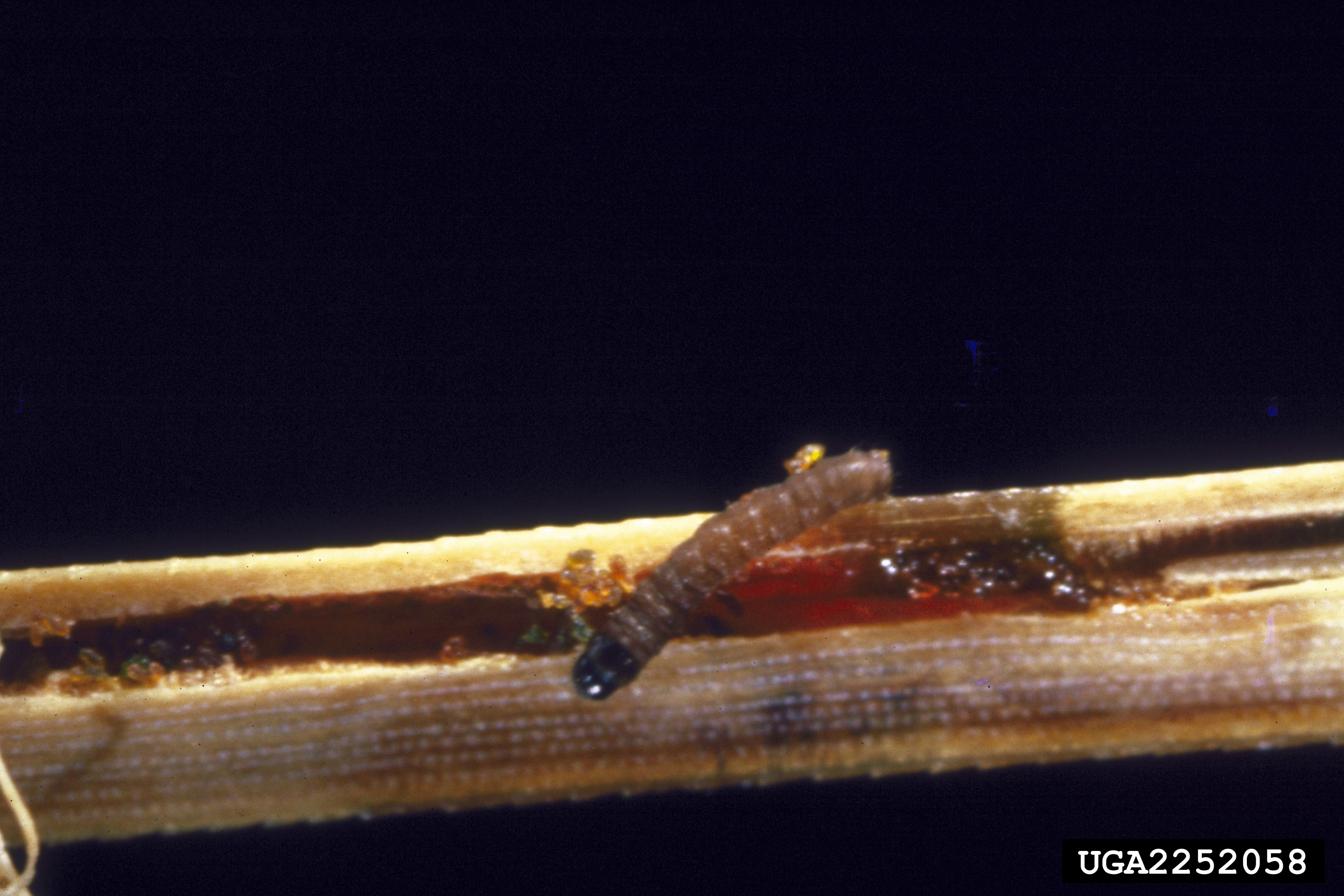

Scientific classification
- Kingdom: Animalia
- Phylum: Arthropoda
- Class: Insecta
- Order: Lepidoptera
- Family: Gelechiidae
- Genus: Coleotechnites
- Species: C. moreonella

Binomial name
- Coleotechnites moreonella (Heinrich, 1920)

Synonyms
- Recurvaria moreonella Heinrich, 1920

= Coleotechnites moreonella =

Ponderosa pine needleminer

Species of moth

Coleotechnites moreonella, the ponderosa pine needleminer, is a moth of the family Gelechiidae. It is found in the United States, where it has been recorded from Colorado.

== Description ==
The wingspan is approximately 13.5 mm. The forewings are white, densely overlaid with black and with a short sinuate, longitudinal line of black scales on basal third below the cell. Beneath this is a small raised patch of white scales and another small black patch on the outer third of the dorsum. Above this and extending from the end of the sub-basal black streak to the middle of the terminal third of the wing and terminating in a short hook to the dorsum is a narrow irregular line of white scales. There is also a faint shading of black scales near the tornus. Along the apical third of the costal fourth, and along the termen, three black dots are found, inwardly edged with white. The hindwings are smoky fuscous.

The larvae feed on Pinus ponderosa.
