= Coleotechnites occidentis =

Scientific classification
- Kingdom: Animalia
- Phylum: Arthropoda
- Clade: Pancrustacea
- Class: Insecta
- Order: Lepidoptera
- Family: Gelechiidae
- Genus: Coleotechnites
- Species: C. occidentis

Binomial name
- Coleotechnites occidentis (Freeman, 1965)

Synonyms
- Pulicalvaria occidentis Freeman, 1965

Species of moth

Coleotechnites occidentis is a moth of the family Gelechiidae. It is found in North America, where it has been recorded from British Columbia.

The wingspan is 9–11 mm.

The larvae feed on Juniperus scopulorum. They mine the leaves and stem of their host plant.
