= Coleotechnites pinella =

Scientific classification
- Domain: Eukaryota
- Kingdom: Animalia
- Phylum: Arthropoda
- Class: Insecta
- Order: Lepidoptera
- Family: Gelechiidae
- Genus: Coleotechnites
- Species: C. pinella

Binomial name
- Coleotechnites pinella (Busck, 1906)

Synonyms
- Recurvaria pinella Busck, 1906

Species of moth

Coleotechnites pinella is a moth of the family Gelechiidae. It is found in North America, where it has been recorded from Colorado.

The wingspan is 9–10 mm. The forewings are dark purple, sparsely sprinkled with lighter scales. There is a thin, very indistinct and ill-defined oblique white fascia from the basal fourth of the costa to the basal third of the dorsal edge and there are also two or three very small tufts of black and white raised scales along the dorsal edge below the fold. The hindwings are light fuscous.

The larvae feed on Pinus ponderosa.
