= Coleotechnites mackiei =

Scientific classification
- Kingdom: Animalia
- Phylum: Arthropoda
- Clade: Pancrustacea
- Class: Insecta
- Order: Lepidoptera
- Family: Gelechiidae
- Genus: Coleotechnites
- Species: C. mackiei

Binomial name
- Coleotechnites mackiei (Keifer, 1931)

Synonyms
- Eucordylea mackiei Keifer, 1931

Species of moth

Coleotechnites mackiei is a moth of the family Gelechiidae. It is found in North America, where it has been recorded from California.

The larvae feed on the berries of Manzanita species.
