= Coleotechnites lewisi =

Scientific classification
- Domain: Eukaryota
- Kingdom: Animalia
- Phylum: Arthropoda
- Class: Insecta
- Order: Lepidoptera
- Family: Gelechiidae
- Genus: Coleotechnites
- Species: C. lewisi

Binomial name
- Coleotechnites lewisi (Freeman, 1961)

Synonyms
- Evagora lewisi Freeman, 1961

Species of moth

Coleotechnites lewisi is a moth of the family Gelechiidae. It is found in North America, where it has been recorded from California and Alberta.

The larvae feed on Pinus flexilis.
