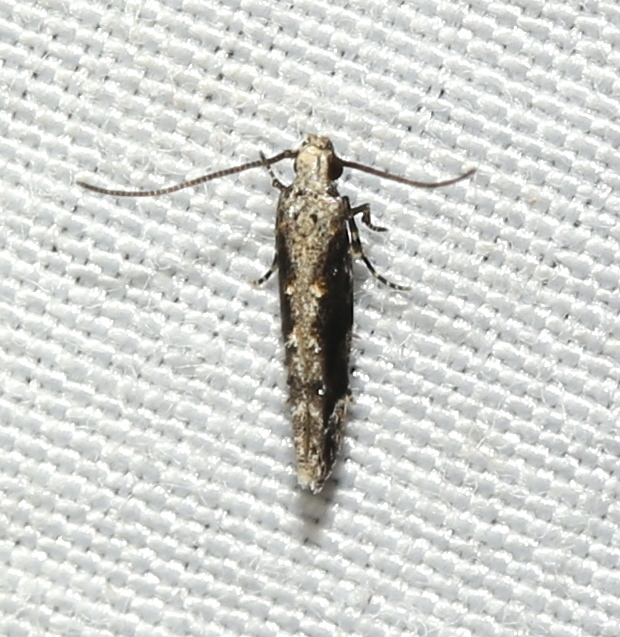

Scientific classification
- Kingdom: Animalia
- Phylum: Arthropoda
- Clade: Pancrustacea
- Class: Insecta
- Order: Lepidoptera
- Family: Gelechiidae
- Genus: Coleotechnites
- Species: C. quercivorella

Binomial name
- Coleotechnites quercivorella (Chambers, 1872)

Synonyms
- Gelechia quercivorella Chambers, 1872; Gelechia (Teleia) gilviscopella Zeller, 1873

= Coleotechnites quercivorella =

Species of moth

Coleotechnites quercivorella is a moth of the family Gelechiidae. It is found in North America, where it has been recorded from Alabama, Alberta, British Columbia, California, Illinois, Kentucky, Maine, Maryland, Massachusetts, Minnesota, New Brunswick, New Hampshire, New Jersey, North Dakota, Ohio, Oklahoma, Ontario, Pennsylvania, Quebec, South Carolina, Tennessee, Texas and West Virginia.

The wingspan is about 11 mm.

The larvae feed on Quercus species.
