= Coleotechnites resinosae =

Scientific classification
- Kingdom: Animalia
- Phylum: Arthropoda
- Clade: Pancrustacea
- Class: Insecta
- Order: Lepidoptera
- Family: Gelechiidae
- Genus: Coleotechnites
- Species: C. resinosae

Binomial name
- Coleotechnites resinosae (Freeman, 1961)

Synonyms
- Evagora resinosae Freeman, 1961

Species of moth

Coleotechnites resinosae, the red pine needleminer moth, is a moth of the family Gelechiidae. It is found in North America, where it has been recorded from Ontario, Alabama and New Hampshire.

The larvae feed on Pinus resinosa. They mine the needles of their host plant. The needles are mined from the base or center to the tip. A short, silken tube constructed around the entrance hole on the flattened surface of the needle. The frass is ejected from the entrance hole and from one or two other holes.
