= Coleotechnites huntella =

Scientific classification
- Domain: Eukaryota
- Kingdom: Animalia
- Phylum: Arthropoda
- Class: Insecta
- Order: Lepidoptera
- Family: Gelechiidae
- Genus: Coleotechnites
- Species: C. huntella

Binomial name
- Coleotechnites huntella (Keifer, 1936)

Synonyms
- Eucordylea huntella Keifer, 1936

Species of moth

Coleotechnites huntella is a moth of the family Gelechiidae. It is found in North America, where it has been recorded from California and Oregon.

The wingspan is 14–15 mm.

The larvae feed on the flower buds of Rhododendron occidentale and Rhododendron californicum. Full-grown larvae reach a length of about 10 mm. They have a red or purplish-red body.
