= Coleotechnites macleodi =

Scientific classification
- Domain: Eukaryota
- Kingdom: Animalia
- Phylum: Arthropoda
- Class: Insecta
- Order: Lepidoptera
- Family: Gelechiidae
- Genus: Coleotechnites
- Species: C. macleodi

Binomial name
- Coleotechnites macleodi (Freeman, 1965)

Synonyms
- Pulicalvaira macleodi Freeman, 1965

Species of moth

Coleotechnites macleodi, the brown hemlock needleminer, is a moth of the family Gelechiidae. It is found in the north-eastern parts of the United States, as well as Canada.

The wingspan is 9–11 mm. There is one generation per year.

The larvae feed on Tsuga canadensis.
