= Coleotechnites ducharmei =

Scientific classification
- Domain: Eukaryota
- Kingdom: Animalia
- Phylum: Arthropoda
- Class: Insecta
- Order: Lepidoptera
- Family: Gelechiidae
- Genus: Coleotechnites
- Species: C. ducharmei

Binomial name
- Coleotechnites ducharmei (Freeman, 1962)

Synonyms
- Eucordylea ducharmei Freeman, 1962

Species of moth

Coleotechnites ducharmei is a moth of the family Gelechiidae. It is found in North America, where it has been recorded in south-western Nova Scotia, southern Quebec, Ontario, and Alberta.

Adults are brownish-grey. There is one generation per year, with adults on the wing in June.

The larvae feed on Picea species, including Picea rubens, Picea mariana, and Picea glauca.
