= Coleotechnites australis =

Scientific classification
- Kingdom: Animalia
- Phylum: Arthropoda
- Clade: Pancrustacea
- Class: Insecta
- Order: Lepidoptera
- Family: Gelechiidae
- Genus: Coleotechnites
- Species: C. australis

Binomial name
- Coleotechnites australis (Freeman, 1963)

Synonyms
- Pulicalvaria australis Freeman, 1963

Species of moth

Coleotechnites australis is a moth of the family Gelechiidae. It is found in North America, where it has been recorded from Alabama, Arkansas, Florida, Louisiana and Mississippi.

Adults have been recorded on wing in March and from May to September.

The larvae feed on Juniperus virginiana.
