= Coleotechnites colubrinae =

Scientific classification
- Domain: Eukaryota
- Kingdom: Animalia
- Phylum: Arthropoda
- Class: Insecta
- Order: Lepidoptera
- Family: Gelechiidae
- Genus: Coleotechnites
- Species: C. colubrinae

Binomial name
- Coleotechnites colubrinae (Busck, 1903)

Synonyms
- Recurvaria colubrinae Busck, 1903

Species of moth

Coleotechnites colubrinae is a moth of the family Gelechiidae. It is found in North America, where it has been recorded from Texas.

The wingspan is about 10 mm. The forewings are dirty ochreous white, the outer half suffused with light fuscous. On the costa, there are three equidistant brown spots, one near the base, one at the middle, and one at the beginning of the costal cilia. In the middle of the wing, there are three small brown spots in a straight longitudinal line, one at the basal third, one at middle of the wing, and one at the end of the cell. Just within the dorsal cilia are two large ill-defined longitudinal brown spots, and at the apical edge is a row of dark dots. The hindwings are silvery fuscous.

The larvae are thought to feed on psyllids in galls on Colubrina texana.
