= Coleotechnites edulicola =

Scientific classification
- Kingdom: Animalia
- Phylum: Arthropoda
- Clade: Pancrustacea
- Class: Insecta
- Order: Lepidoptera
- Family: Gelechiidae
- Genus: Coleotechnites
- Species: C. edulicola

Binomial name
- Coleotechnites edulicola Hodges and Stevens, 1978

Species of moth

Coleotechnites edulicola is a moth of the family Gelechiidae. It is found in North America, where it has been recorded from New Mexico and southern Utah and possibly Colorado.

The wingspan is about 10 mm. Adults are on wing in June and July in one generation per year.

The larvae feed on Pinus ponderosa and Pinus edulis.
