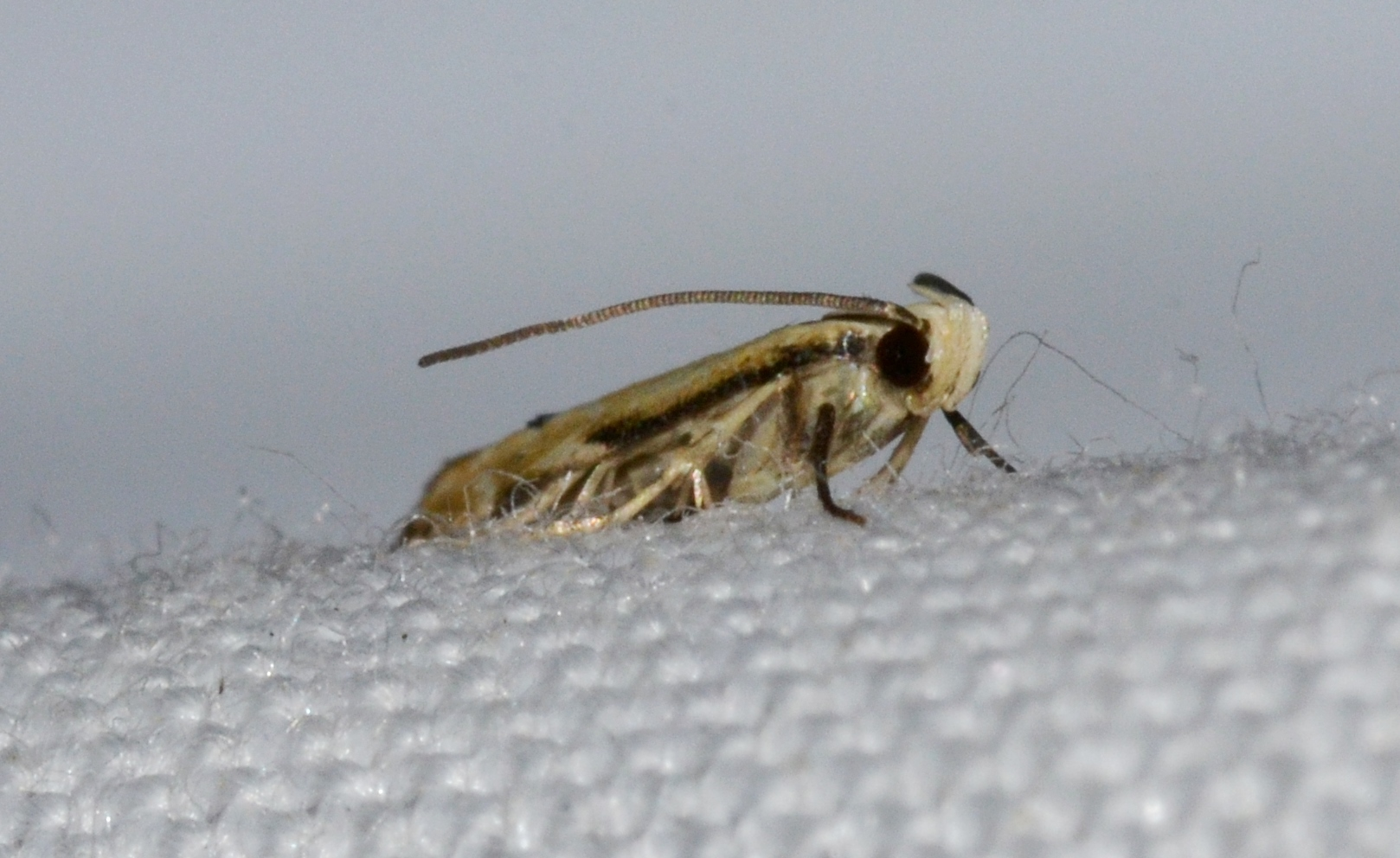

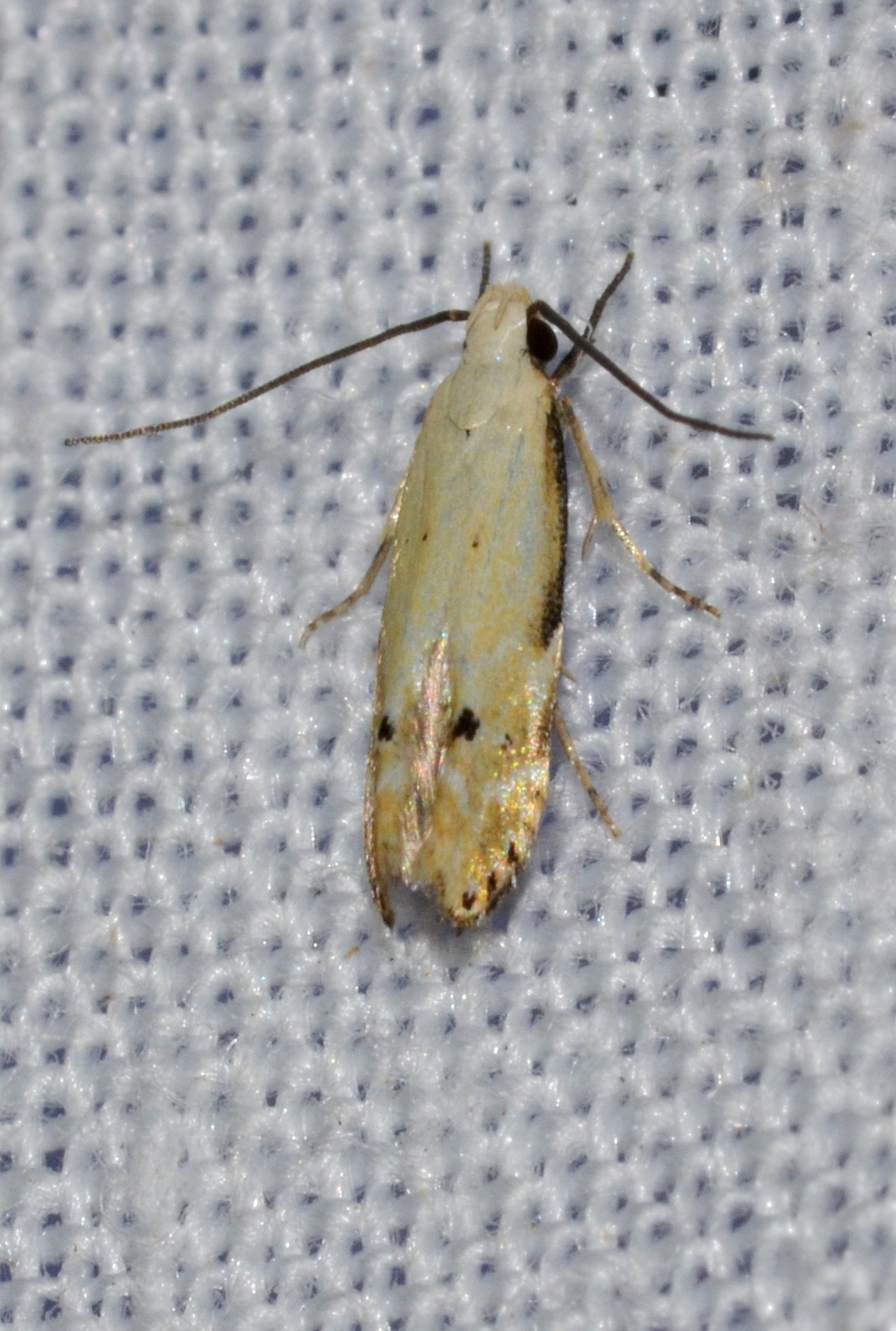

Scientific classification
- Kingdom: Animalia
- Phylum: Arthropoda
- Clade: Pancrustacea
- Class: Insecta
- Order: Lepidoptera
- Family: Gelechiidae
- Genus: Coleotechnites
- Species: C. variiella

Binomial name
- Coleotechnites variiella (Chambers, 1872)

Synonyms
- Gelechia variiella Chambers, 1872; Coleotechnites variella

= Coleotechnites variiella =

Species of moth

Coleotechnites variiella is a moth of the family Gelechiidae. It is found in the United States, where it has been recorded from Illinois, Indiana, Kentucky, Maryland, North Carolina, Ohio, South Carolina and Texas.

The wingspan is about 9 mm. Adults have been recorded on wing from May to June.

The larvae feed on cypress species.
