= Coleotechnites cristatella =

Scientific classification
- Kingdom: Animalia
- Phylum: Arthropoda
- Clade: Pancrustacea
- Class: Insecta
- Order: Lepidoptera
- Family: Gelechiidae
- Genus: Coleotechnites
- Species: C. cristatella

Binomial name
- Coleotechnites cristatella (Chambers, 1875)

Synonyms
- Gelechia cristatella Chambers, 1875

Species of moth

Coleotechnites cristatella is a moth of the family Gelechiidae. It is found in North America, where it has been recorded from Kentucky.

The base of the forewings is dark brown, mixed with white and with a distinct tuft on the fold margining the dark brown basal portion behind, then follows an oblique white costal streak crossing the fold and interrupted on the fold. Behind this, another dark brown band crosses the middle of the wing, margined behind by two raised tufts, one of which is above and the other beneath the fold, and followed by a transverse band of mixed white and brown, which is margined in part behind, by a brown tuft within the dorsal margin nearly opposite the beginning of the cilia, behind which the apical part of the wing is brown sprinkled with white, except a short slightly curved dorsal white streak at the beginning of the cilia, and a similar larger opposite costal streak.
