= Coleotechnites thujaella =

Scientific classification
- Kingdom: Animalia
- Phylum: Arthropoda
- Clade: Pancrustacea
- Class: Insecta
- Order: Lepidoptera
- Family: Gelechiidae
- Genus: Coleotechnites
- Species: C. thujaella

Binomial name
- Coleotechnites thujaella (Kearfott, 1903)

Synonyms
- Recurvaria thujaella Kearfott, 1903

Species of moth

Coleotechnites thujaella (brown arborvitae leafminer or brown cedar leafminer; mineuse rougeâtre du thuya) is a moth of the family Gelechiidae. It is found in the north-eastern parts of the United States, as well as Canada. They are one of several arborvitae or cedar leafminer moth species damaging eastern white cedar (Thuja occidentalis) in the region, including Argyresthia aureoargentella, Argyresthia canadensis, and Argyresthia thuiella. Coleotechnites thujaella and A. thuiella are known to be the two most common of these leafminers.

The wingspan is 9–10 mm. The forewings are cream white with three outwardly oblique, roughly triangular, black costal patches, all edged outwardly with whitish scales. The inner begins at the base and extends nearly to the dorsum, the middle patch at the inner third and the outer at the outer third are both smaller and reach only to the median line. There is a denser cluster of black raised scales at the lower apex of each forming a distinct black dot. Below each, close to the dorsum is a small black dot and close to the costa between the basal and middle patch is a sixth black dot, these six dots are in three vertical pairs, almost evenly spaced and are all formed of black raised scales bordered by one or two pure white scales. The outer patch is bordered by a white line from the costa, curving obliquely outward to the middle of the wing and then obliquely inward to the dorsum. Beyond this white line on the costa is a patch of ground colour more or less evenly overlaid with dark brown scales, beyond this on outer margin is a wide band of blackish-brown and a paler streak at the extreme outer edge. On the costa before the apex are three small black dots, also one at apex, one on the outer margin close to the apex and one close to the outer angle, these six spots are of black raised scales with one or two white scales bordering each. The apical spot is narrowly ringed with ground colour, this ring is bordered by darker scales, these scales being condensed into a fine semicircular line on the extreme apical margin, the whole forming a clearly defined apical ocellus. The hindwings are light grey. There is one generation per year.

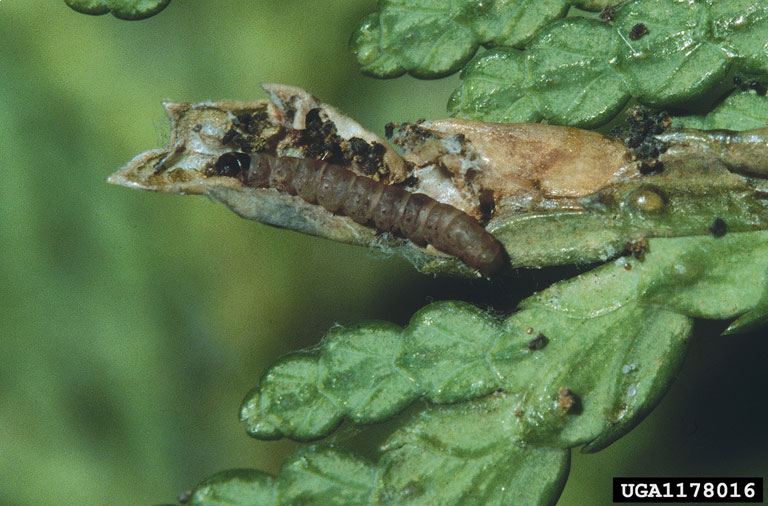
Coleotechnites thujaella on eastern white cedar.
