= Coleotechnites invictella =

Scientific classification
- Domain: Eukaryota
- Kingdom: Animalia
- Phylum: Arthropoda
- Class: Insecta
- Order: Lepidoptera
- Family: Gelechiidae
- Genus: Coleotechnites
- Species: C. invictella

Binomial name
- Coleotechnites invictella (Busck, 1908)

Synonyms
- Recurvaria invictella Busck, 1908

Species of moth

Coleotechnites invictella is a moth of the family Gelechiidae. It is found in North America, where it has been recorded from California.

The wingspan is about 12 mm. The forewings are light silvery grey overlaid with brown and black scales. The extreme base of the wing is brown and there is a slight sprinkling of dark scales on the cell and along the fold. There is an outwardly angulated blackish brown fascia across the wing at the apical third, not clearly defined toward the base of the wing, but exteriorly rather sharply edged by a whitish area. The tip is sprinkled with black and brown. The hindwings are light fuscous. Adults have been recorded on wing from April to May.
