= Coleotechnites argentiabella =

Scientific classification
- Kingdom: Animalia
- Phylum: Arthropoda
- Clade: Pancrustacea
- Class: Insecta
- Order: Lepidoptera
- Family: Gelechiidae
- Genus: Coleotechnites
- Species: C. argentiabella

Binomial name
- Coleotechnites argentiabella (Chambers, 1874)

Synonyms
- Gelechia argentiabella Chambers, 1874

Species of moth

Coleotechnites argentiabella is a moth of the family Gelechiidae. It is found in North America, where it has been recorded from Texas.

There is a small dark brown spot on the extreme costa at the base of the forewings, followed by three others within the margin, and there is also a small one within the dorsal margin near the base and there is a transverse brown spot or line on the fold, and another at the end of the disc, a brownish fascia at the beginning of the cilia, and a brownish golden streak around the apex at the base of the cilia.
