= Coleotechnites nigritus =

Scientific classification
- Kingdom: Animalia
- Phylum: Arthropoda
- Clade: Pancrustacea
- Class: Insecta
- Order: Lepidoptera
- Family: Gelechiidae
- Genus: Coleotechnites
- Species: C. nigritus

Binomial name
- Coleotechnites nigritus Hodges, 1983

Synonyms
- Recurvaria nigra Busck, 1903 (preocc. Haworth, 1828)

Species of moth

Coleotechnites nigritus is a moth of the family Gelechiidae. It is found in North America, where it has been recorded from Florida, Kentucky, and New Hampshire.

The wingspan is about 11 mm. The forewings are silvery white, thickly overlaid with black and dark fuscous scales. There are six deep black spots of raised scales in two rows: one above, the other below the fold. At apical fourth is a very narrow, irregular, V-shaped, silvery white fascia, with the angle pointed toward the tip of the wing. Further out toward the apex, is a very indistinct thin row of white scales, parallel with the costal edge and meeting a similar line parallel to the dorsal edge just before the apex. The hindwings are nearly black, with metallic luster.

The larvae feed on Hypericum fruticosa.
