= Coleotechnites laricis =

Scientific classification
- Kingdom: Animalia
- Phylum: Arthropoda
- Class: Insecta
- Order: Lepidoptera
- Family: Gelechiidae
- Genus: Coleotechnites
- Species: C. laricis

Binomial name
- Coleotechnites laricis (Freeman, 1965)

Synonyms
- Pulicalvaria laricis Freeman, 1965

Species of moth

The orange larch tubemaker (Coleotechnites laricis) is a species of moth in the family Gelechiidae. It is found in eastern Canada and the north-eastern United States.

The wingspan is 10.5–13 mm. The forewings are shining black with fawn coloured scales. The hindwings are light grey. There is one generation per year.

The larvae feed on eastern larch.
