= Coleotechnites carbonaria =

Scientific classification
- Domain: Eukaryota
- Kingdom: Animalia
- Phylum: Arthropoda
- Class: Insecta
- Order: Lepidoptera
- Family: Gelechiidae
- Genus: Coleotechnites
- Species: C. carbonaria

Binomial name
- Coleotechnites carbonaria (Freeman, 1965)

Synonyms
- Pulicalvaria carbonaria Freeman, 1965

Species of moth

Coleotechnites carbonaria is a moth of the family Gelechiidae. It is found in North America, where it has been recorded from Ontario and Tennessee.

The wingspan is 7.5–10 mm.

The larvae feed on Juniperus species. They mine the leaves and stems of their host plant.
