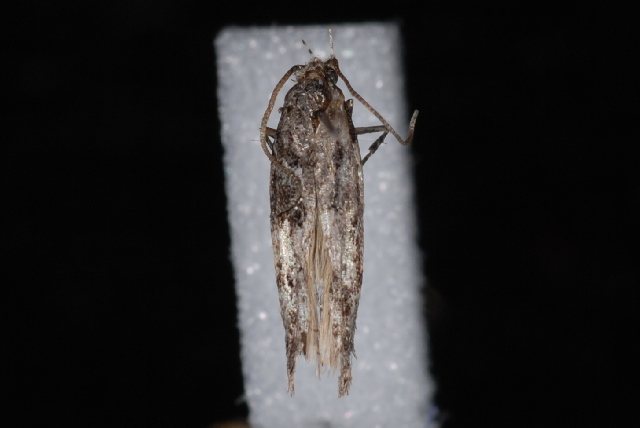

Scientific classification
- Domain: Eukaryota
- Kingdom: Animalia
- Phylum: Arthropoda
- Class: Insecta
- Order: Lepidoptera
- Family: Gelechiidae
- Genus: Coleotechnites
- Species: C. blastovora

Binomial name
- Coleotechnites blastovora (McLeod, 1962)

Synonyms
- Eucordylea blastovora McLeod, 1962

= Coleotechnites blastovora =

Species of moth

Coleotechnites blastovora is a moth of the family Gelechiidae. It is found in North America, where it has been recorded from Quebec, Alberta, British Columbia, New Brunswick and Saskatchewan.

The larvae feed on Picea and Abies species, occasionally mining the needles of their host plant.
