= Coleotechnites ardas =

Scientific classification
- Domain: Eukaryota
- Kingdom: Animalia
- Phylum: Arthropoda
- Class: Insecta
- Order: Lepidoptera
- Family: Gelechiidae
- Genus: Coleotechnites
- Species: C. ardas

Binomial name
- Coleotechnites ardas (Freeman, 1961)

Synonyms
- Evagora ardas Freeman, 1961

Species of moth

Coleotechnites ardas is a moth of the family Gelechiidae. It is found in North America, where it has been recorded from Saskatchewan.

The larvae feed on Pinus contorta.
