= Coleotechnites coniferella =

Scientific classification
- Domain: Eukaryota
- Kingdom: Animalia
- Phylum: Arthropoda
- Class: Insecta
- Order: Lepidoptera
- Family: Gelechiidae
- Genus: Coleotechnites
- Species: C. coniferella

Binomial name
- Coleotechnites coniferella (Kearfott, 1907)

Synonyms
- Recurvaria coniferella Kearfott, 1907

Species of moth

Coleotechnites coniferella is a moth of the family Gelechiidae. It is found in North America, where it has been recorded from California, Illinois, Indiana, Maryland, Massachusetts, Michigan, Minnesota, Mississippi, New York, Ontario, Washington and Wisconsin.

The wingspan is about 9 mm (0.35 in). The forewings are yellowish-white or pale cinereous, overlaid with white in the middle of the wing from the base to the end of the cell, and above the fold. There are three oblique fasciae, all much broken into spots. The inner consists of a black dot on the costa at the base, and there is a tuft of black and white raised scales below the fold at the inner fifth. The second consists of a black dot on the costa before the middle, hardly separated from a larger dot below it on the middle of the wing. Below this is a third distinctly separated dot above the dorsum. The outer fascia begins in outer third of the costa, with a large dot. Below it, towards the base, is a small round dot, and another towards the apex in the form of a short horizontal line. Below the first of these, above the dorsum, is another small dot. All of these dots, except on the costa, consist of tufts of black raised scales, bounded outwardly with white raised scales. The apex of the wing is heavily powdered with black, obscurely forming four black marginal dots. The hindwings are pale grey.

The larvae feed on Pinus species.
