= Coleotechnites apicitripunctella =

Scientific classification
- Kingdom: Animalia
- Phylum: Arthropoda
- Clade: Pancrustacea
- Class: Insecta
- Order: Lepidoptera
- Family: Gelechiidae
- Genus: Coleotechnites
- Species: C. apicitripunctella

Binomial name
- Coleotechnites apicitripunctella (Clemens, 1860)

Synonyms
- Evagora apicitripunctella Clemens, 1860; Recurvaria apicitripunctella; Gelechia attritella Walker, 1864; Gelechia abietisella Packard, 1883

Species of moth

The green hemlock needleminer, hemlock leaf miner or baldcypress webworm (Coleotechnites apicitripunctella) is a moth of the family Gelechiidae. It is found in the eastern parts of the United States, as well as eastern Canada.

== Description ==
The larva have a pale, yellowish green body, a slightly orange-brown head and a prothoracic shield (the plate of the first thoracic segment just behind the head). The prothoracic shield has light gray margins on the sides. There are many small, dark green spots conspicuously displayed along the body. The larva grow up to 7 mm long.

The moth is beige with brown markings.

== Life cycle ==
There is one generation per year.

The larvae feed on Tsuga canadensis (the Canadian or eastern hemlock), and Taxodium distichum (the bald cypress).
