= Coleotechnites elucidella =

Scientific classification
- Domain: Eukaryota
- Kingdom: Animalia
- Phylum: Arthropoda
- Class: Insecta
- Order: Lepidoptera
- Family: Gelechiidae
- Genus: Coleotechnites
- Species: C. elucidella

Binomial name
- Coleotechnites elucidella (Barnes & Busck, 1920)

Synonyms
- Eucordylea elucidella Barnes & Busck, 1920

Species of moth

Coleotechnites elucidella is a moth of the family Gelechiidae described by William Barnes and August Busck in 1920. It is found in North America, where it has been recorded from California.

The wingspan is 11–13 mm. The forewings are light gray with three ill-defined and obscure blackish dashes on the costa, one at the basal fourth, one on the middle and one at the apical third. These black dashes are edged with white and are faintly continued across the wing, the first as an outwardly oblique narrow and broken fascia, the two others straight across the wing. Each of these fascia is emphasized by tufts of raised black scales, edged with white, two of which on each fascia are larger than the other markings. The hindwings are light fuscous, in males with a large expansive bright yellow hair tuft at the base.
