= Coleotechnites gallicola =

Scientific classification
- Kingdom: Animalia
- Phylum: Arthropoda
- Clade: Pancrustacea
- Class: Insecta
- Order: Lepidoptera
- Family: Gelechiidae
- Genus: Coleotechnites
- Species: C. gallicola

Binomial name
- Coleotechnites gallicola (Busck, 1915)

Synonyms
- Eucordylea gallicola Busck, 1915

Species of moth

Coleotechnites gallicola is a moth of the family Gelechiidae. It is found in North America, where it has been recorded from Colorado and California.

The wingspan is about 13 mm. The forewings are light fuscous with three black costal dashes, one near the base, one on the middle and one at the apical third. These black costal spots are exteriorly edged by thin, ill-defined white lines, which continue obliquely across the wing, the two outer ones meeting on the termen just below the apex. There are two longitudinal black streaks on the middle of the wing, one just before and one after the end of the cell. Before and below the first of these is a small group of slightly raised, rust-red scales on the fold. The hindwings are light fuscous, in males with a large expansible, bright yellow hair tuft at the base.

The larvae have been recorded in galls of the sawfly Euura macgillivrayi on Salix.
