= Coleotechnites martini =

Scientific classification
- Domain: Eukaryota
- Kingdom: Animalia
- Phylum: Arthropoda
- Class: Insecta
- Order: Lepidoptera
- Family: Gelechiidae
- Genus: Coleotechnites
- Species: C. martini

Binomial name
- Coleotechnites martini (Freeman, 1965)

Synonyms
- Pulicalvaria martini Freeman, 1965

Species of moth

Coleotechnites martini is a moth of the family Gelechiidae. It is found in North America, where it has been recorded from Ontario and Maine.

The wingspan is 9–10 mm.
