= Coleotechnites condignella =

Scientific classification
- Domain: Eukaryota
- Kingdom: Animalia
- Phylum: Arthropoda
- Class: Insecta
- Order: Lepidoptera
- Family: Gelechiidae
- Genus: Coleotechnites
- Species: C. condignella

Binomial name
- Coleotechnites condignella (Busck, 1929)

Synonyms
- Recurvaria condignella Busck, 1929

Species of moth

Coleotechnites condignella is a moth of the family Gelechiidae. It is found in North America, where it has been recorded from California, Arizona, South Carolina and Florida.

The wingspan is 13–15 mm.

The larvae feed on Pinus ponderosa.
