= Coleotechnites petulans =

Scientific classification
- Kingdom: Animalia
- Phylum: Arthropoda
- Class: Insecta
- Order: Lepidoptera
- Family: Gelechiidae
- Genus: Coleotechnites
- Species: C. petulans

Binomial name
- Coleotechnites petulans (Meyrick, 1917)

Synonyms
- Hapalosaris petulans Meyrick, 1917

Species of moth

Coleotechnites petulans is a moth of the family Gelechiidae. It is found in Colombia, Ecuador and Peru.

The wingspan is 9–11 mm. The forewings are white, irregularly irrorated with fuscous and dark fuscous, more thinly towards the dorsum anteriorly. There is an oblique blackish bar from the costa at one-sixth to the fold, as well as blackish spots on the costa before the middle and at two-thirds and a black subcostal dot at one-fourth. The stigmata are black, sometimes ringed with white, the plical rather obliquely before the first discal, an additional dot between the second discal and the dorsum. A small blackish spot is found on the dorsum before tornus and there are three blackish dots on the costa towards the apex, the apical area is darker-suffused. The hindwings are light grey, in males thinly scaled and whitish-tinged anteriorly.
