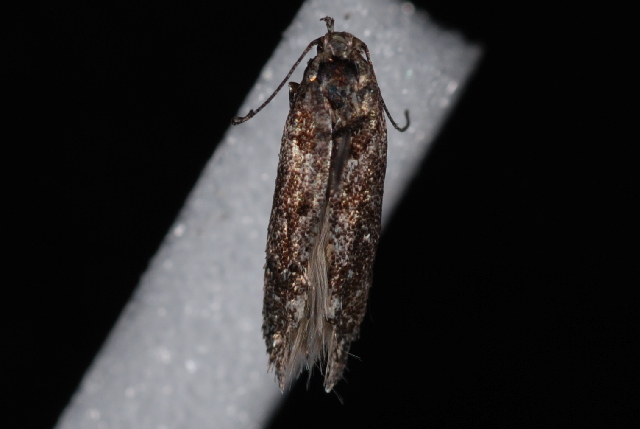

Scientific classification
- Domain: Eukaryota
- Kingdom: Animalia
- Phylum: Arthropoda
- Class: Insecta
- Order: Lepidoptera
- Family: Gelechiidae
- Genus: Coleotechnites
- Species: C. florae

Binomial name
- Coleotechnites florae (Freeman, 1961)

Synonyms
- Evagora florae Freeman, 1961

= Coleotechnites florae =

Coleotechnites flower moth

Species of insect

Coleotechnites florae, the coleotechnites flower moth, is a moth of the family Gelechiidae. It is found in North America, where it has been recorded from Alabama, Alberta, Arkansas, British Columbia, Florida, Georgia, Indiana, Louisiana, Maryland, Massachusetts, Michigan, Minnesota, Mississippi, Montana, North Carolina, Oklahoma, Saskatchewan, South Carolina, Tennessee, Texas and Washington.

The larvae are known to feed on Pinus contorta.
