= Coleotechnites granti =

Scientific classification
- Domain: Eukaryota
- Kingdom: Animalia
- Phylum: Arthropoda
- Class: Insecta
- Order: Lepidoptera
- Family: Gelechiidae
- Genus: Coleotechnites
- Species: C. granti

Binomial name
- Coleotechnites granti (Freeman, 1965)

Synonyms
- Pulicalvaria granti Freeman, 1965

Species of moth

Coleotechnites granti is a moth of the family Gelechiidae. It is found in North America, where it has been recorded from British Columbia.

The wingspan is 9-9.5 mm.

The larvae feed on Abies grandis. They mine the leaves of their host plant.
