= Coleotechnites stanfordia =

Cypress leaf miner

Scientific classification
- Domain: Eukaryota
- Kingdom: Animalia
- Phylum: Arthropoda
- Class: Insecta
- Order: Lepidoptera
- Family: Gelechiidae
- Genus: Coleotechnites
- Species: C. stanfordia

Binomial name
- Coleotechnites stanfordia (Keifer, 1933)

Synonyms
- Recurvaria stanfordia Keifer, 1933

Species of moth

Coleotechnites stanfordia, the cypress leaf miner, is a moth of the family Gelechiidae. It is found in the United States, where it has been recorded from California.

The wingspan is 9.5-11.5 mm. The forewings are irrorated (speckled) fuscous, the costal base infused and irrorated dark fuscous and with blackish scales within the costa and there is slight fuscous infusion carried along the costa to the second costal spot at the basal third, which spot has some raised black scales within the costa. Halfway between the first two costal spots is a black spot well within the costa. The third costal spot is found just before the apical third of the wing and a blackish spot or tuft at the base of the fold. Black paired tufts are found at the basal fifth, just beyond the basal third and just before the apical third respectively, the first pair on either side of the fold, the lower of the second pair in the fold, the third pair confluent at the end of the cell, directly below the third costal spot and almost connected to it. There is also a faint very angulate narrow fascia from the beginning of the costa. The hindwings are slightly whiter, very lightly fuscous.

The larvae feed on Cupressus macrocarpa. The larvae have a yellow body, overlaid with red and a brown head.
