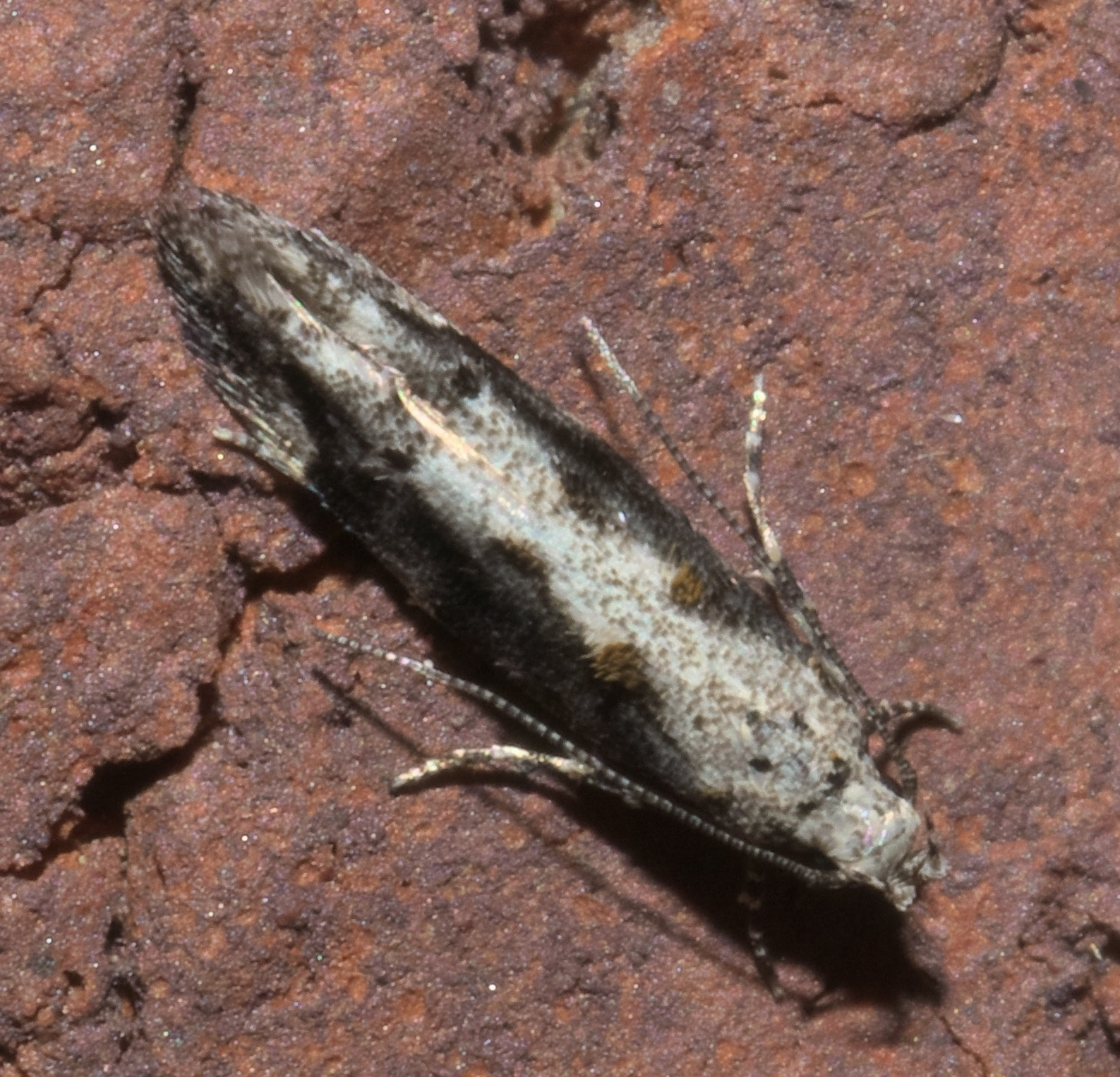
- Coleotechnites florae

Scientific classification
- Kingdom: Animalia
- Phylum: Arthropoda
- Class: Insecta
- Order: Lepidoptera
- Family: Gelechiidae
- Subfamily: Gelechiinae
- Tribe: Litini
- Genus: Coleotechnites; Chambers, 1880

Synonyms
- Eidothea Chambers, 1873; Eidothoa Chambers, 1873 (missp.); Eucordylea Dietz, 1900; Evagora Clemens, 1860; Hapalosaris Meyrick, 1917; Pulicalvaria Freeman, 1963; Coleotechnistes Busck, [1903]

= Coleotechnites =

Genus of moths

Coleotechnites is a genus of moths in the family Gelechiidae described by Vactor Tousey Chambers in 1880. One of the best known species is the lodgepole needle miner (C. milleri), a serious pest of forest trees in North America.

== Species ==
- Coleotechnites albicostata (Freeman, 1965) (Eucordylea)
- Coleotechnites alnifructella (Busck, 1915) (Recurvaria)
- Coleotechnites apicitripunctella (Clemens, 1860) (Recurvaria)
- Coleotechnites ardas (Freeman, 1960) (Evagora)
- Coleotechnites argentiabella (Chambers, 1874) (Gelechia)
- Coleotechnites atrupictella (Dietz, 1900) (Eucordylea)
- Coleotechnites australis (Freeman, 1963) (Pulicalvaria)
- Coleotechnites bacchariella (Keifer, 1927) (Recurvaria)
- Coleotechnites biopes (Freeman, 1960) (Evagora)
- Coleotechnites blastovora (McLeod, 1962) (Eucordylea)
- Coleotechnites canusella (Freeman, 1957) (Recurvaria)
- Coleotechnites carbonaria (Freeman, 1965) (Pulicalvaria)
- Coleotechnites chillcotti (Freeman, 1963) (Exoteleia)
- Coleotechnites citriella (Chambers, 1880) (Recurvaria)
- Coleotechnites colubrinae (Busck, 1903) (Recurvaria)
- Coleotechnites condignella (Busck, 1929) (Recurvaria)
- Coleotechnites coniferella (Kearfott, 1907) (Recurvaria)
- Coleotechnites cristatella (Chambers, 1875) (Gelechia)
- Coleotechnites ducharmei (Freeman, 1962) (Eucordylea)
- Coleotechnites edulicola Hodges & Stevens, 1978
- Coleotechnites elucidella (Barnes & Busck, 1920) (Eucordylea)
- Coleotechnites eryngiella (Bottimer, 1926) (Recurvaria)
- Coleotechnites florae (Freeman, 1960) (Evagora)
- Coleotechnites gallicola (Busck, 1915) (Recurvaria)
- Coleotechnites gibsonella (Kearfott, 1907) (Recurvaria)
- Coleotechnites granti (Freeman, 1965) (Publicalvaria)
- Coleotechnites huntella (Keifer, 1936) (Eucordylea)
- Coleotechnites invictella (Busck, 1908) (Recurvaria)
- Coleotechnites juniperella (Kearfott, 1903) (Recurvaria)
- Coleotechnites laricis (Freeman, 1965) (Pulicalvaria)
- Coleotechnites lewisi (Freeman, 1960) (Evagora)
- Coleotechnites mackiei (Keifer, 1932) (Eucordylea)
- Coleotechnites macleodi (Freeman, 1965) (Pulicalvaira)
- Coleotechnites martini (Freeman, 1965) (Pulicalvaria)
- Coleotechnites milleri (Busck, 1914) (Recurvaria)
- Coleotechnites moreonella (Heinr., 1920) (Recurvaria)
- Coleotechnites nigritus Hodges, 1983
- Coleotechnites obliquistrigella (Chambers, 1872) (Anarsia)
- Coleotechnites occidentis (Freeman, 1965) (Pulicalvaria)
- Coleotechnites petulans (Meyrick, 1917) (Hapalosaris)
- Coleotechnites piceaella (Kearfott, 1903) (Recurvaria)
- Coleotechnites pinella (Busck, 1906) (Recurvaria)
- Coleotechnites ponderosae Hodges & Stevens, 1978
- Coleotechnites quercivorella (Chambers, 1872) (Gelechia)
- Coleotechnites resinosae (Freeman, 1960) (Evagora)
- Coleotechnites stanfordia (Keifer, 1933) (Recurvaria)
- Coleotechnites starki (Freeman, 1957) (Recurvaria)
- Coleotechnites thujaella (Kearfott, 1903) (Recurvaria)
- Coleotechnites vagatioella (Chambers, 1873) (Eidothoa)
- Coleotechnites variiella (Chambers, 1872) (Gelechia)

== Former species ==
- Coleotechnites abietisella (Packard, 1883) (Gelechia)
- Coleotechnites attritella (Walker, 1864) (Gelechia)
- Coleotechnites dorsivittella (Zeller, 1873) (Gelechia)
- Coleotechnites gilviscopella (Zeller, 1873) (Gelechia)
- Coleotechnites niger (Busck, 1903) (Recurvaria)
- Coleotechnites obscurella (Kearfott, 1907) (Recurvaria)
