= Coleotechnites juniperella =

Scientific classification
- Domain: Eukaryota
- Kingdom: Animalia
- Phylum: Arthropoda
- Class: Insecta
- Order: Lepidoptera
- Family: Gelechiidae
- Genus: Coleotechnites
- Species: C. juniperella

Binomial name
- Coleotechnites juniperella (Kearfott, 1903)

Synonyms
- Recurvaria juniperella Kearfott, 1903

Species of moth

Coleotechnites juniperella is a moth of the family Gelechiidae. It is found in North America, where it has been recorded from New Jersey.

The wingspan is about 9.5 mm. The forewings are creamy white, a sharply defined narrow band of black raised scales slightly and evenly curved from the base along the median line to the apex of the wing, at the base this black band extends to the costa to one eighth. Above this band the ground colour is more of a pearly white, and forms a distinct whitish streak. There is a short line of black on the costa at the inner third and at the outer third a longer line of black, the latter broadening at the outer end into a triangular patch almost reaching the median band. There are four almost evenly spaced dots of black raised scales parallel to and about midway between the median bands and the inner margin, a fifth dot vertically above the outer on the costal edge of the median band. Three other dots are found in a line along the outer margin. All of the dots are of black raised scales bordered by one or two white scales. The hindwings are pale grey.

The larvae feed on Juniperus communis.
