= Coleotechnites obliquistrigella =

Scientific classification
- Kingdom: Animalia
- Phylum: Arthropoda
- Clade: Pancrustacea
- Class: Insecta
- Order: Lepidoptera
- Family: Gelechiidae
- Genus: Coleotechnites
- Species: C. obliquistrigella

Binomial name
- Coleotechnites obliquistrigella (Chambers, 1872)

Synonyms
- Anarsia obliquistrigella Chambers, 1872

Species of moth

Coleotechnites obliquistrigella is a moth of the family Gelechiidae. It is found in North America, where it has been recorded from Alabama, Florida, Kentucky, Maine, Mississippi, Ohio and Tennessee.

The wingspan is about 11 mm. The forewings are white, thickly dusted with pale grey-brown. There is a dorsal brown streak, near the base, pointing obliquely backwards towards a small costal brown spot, and reaching more than half across the wing. There is also an oblong, costal, dark brown spot about the apical fourth of the wing, a discal, oblong streak opposite the space between the costal spots, and another small one near the beginning of the cilia, and another large one in the apical portion touching the costal margin near the apex. Sometimes, these discal and apical streaks are continuous, forming a streak from the middle of the wing to the apex.
