= Coleotechnites ponderosae =

Scientific classification
- Kingdom: Animalia
- Phylum: Arthropoda
- Clade: Pancrustacea
- Class: Insecta
- Order: Lepidoptera
- Family: Gelechiidae
- Genus: Coleotechnites
- Species: C. ponderosae

Binomial name
- Coleotechnites ponderosae Hodges and Stevens, 1978

Species of moth

Coleotechnites ponderosae, the ponderosa pine needleminer, is a moth of the family Gelechiidae. It is found in the United States, where it has been recorded from Colorado.

The length of the forewings is 3.9-4.8 mm. The forewings are mottled brown and white, with the scale bases white. The hindwings are yellowish gray.

The larvae feed on Pinus ponderosa. Young larvae bore into young needles of their host plant. Larvae complete development in a single needle, pupating in midsummer.
