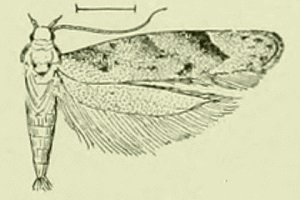

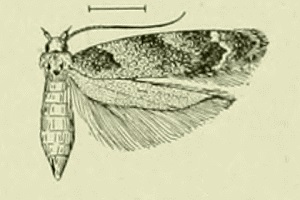

Scientific classification
- Kingdom: Animalia
- Phylum: Arthropoda
- Clade: Pancrustacea
- Class: Insecta
- Order: Lepidoptera
- Family: Gelechiidae
- Genus: Coleotechnites
- Species: C. piceaella

Binomial name
- Coleotechnites piceaella (Kearfott, 1903)

Synonyms
- Recurvaria piceaella Kearfott, 1903; Recurvaria piceaella var. nigra Kearfott, 1903 (preocc. Haworth, 1828); Recurvaria obscurella Kearfott, 1903

= Coleotechnites piceaella =

Species of moth

Coleotechnites piceaella (orange spruce needleminer) is a moth of the family Gelechiidae. It is found in north-eastern United States and Canada. It is an introduced species in Europe and was first recorded from Great Britain in 1952, then Germany in 1963 and has expanded from there over all of central Europe, towards France, Italy and Hungary.

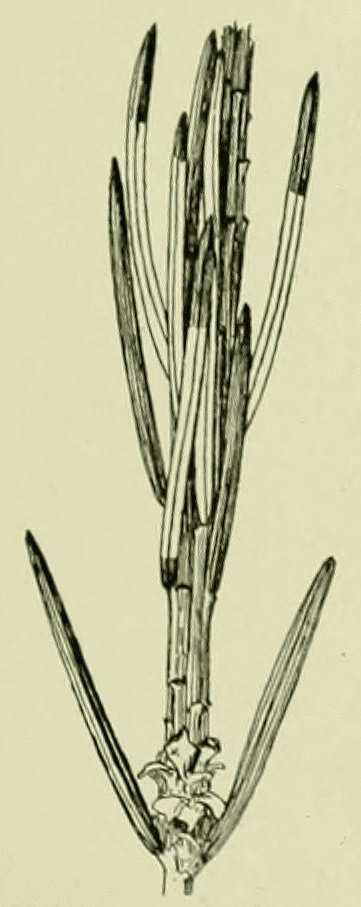
Damage

The orange spruce needleminer is found on spruce and balsam fir from Alberta to Nova Scotia, as well as in the northeastern United States, but causes inconsequential damage (Rose and Lindquist 1985).

There is one generation per year.

== Description ==
The larvae feed on various spruces, including Picea omorika and Picea pungens. The larvae mine needles that are bound loosely with silk during summer and fall.

When full-grown in late June or early July, and about 8 mm long, the larvae pupate in silken cells on the foliage or on the ground. The pupae become adults in about 12 days and the females lay their eggs in the foliage. The eggs hatch and the young larvae feed from August to late September before hibernating near the feeding sites. In the fall, larvae mine living needles, but some larvae are found on dead needles, apparently feeding there on fungi.
