= Coleotechnites albicostata =

White-edged coleotechnites moth

Scientific classification
- Domain: Eukaryota
- Kingdom: Animalia
- Phylum: Arthropoda
- Class: Insecta
- Order: Lepidoptera
- Family: Gelechiidae
- Genus: Coleotechnites
- Species: C. albicostata

Binomial name
- Coleotechnites albicostata (Freeman, 1965)

Synonyms
- Eucordylea albicostata Freeman, 1965

Species of moth

Coleotechnites albicostata, the white-edged coleotechnites moth, is a moth of the family Gelechiidae. It is found in North America, where it has been recorded from Alabama, Maryland, Mississippi, New Jersey, North Carolina, Ontario and Tennessee.

The wingspan is 9–10 mm.
