= Coleotechnites canusella =

Scientific classification
- Domain: Eukaryota
- Kingdom: Animalia
- Phylum: Arthropoda
- Class: Insecta
- Order: Lepidoptera
- Family: Gelechiidae
- Genus: Coleotechnites
- Species: C. canusella

Binomial name
- Coleotechnites canusella (Freeman, 1957)

Synonyms
- Recurvaria canusella Freeman, 1957

Species of moth

Coleotechnites canusella, the banded jack-pine needleminer moth, is a moth of the family Gelechiidae. It is found in North America, where it has been recorded from British Columbia, Washington, Alabama, Arizona, Louisiana, New Mexico and South Carolina.

The larvae feed on Pinus contorta, mining the needles of their host plant.
