= Coleotechnites citriella =

Scientific classification
- Kingdom: Animalia
- Phylum: Arthropoda
- Clade: Pancrustacea
- Class: Insecta
- Order: Lepidoptera
- Family: Gelechiidae
- Genus: Coleotechnites
- Species: C. citriella

Binomial name
- Coleotechnites citriella Chambers, 1880

Species of moth

Coleotechnites citriella is a moth of the family Gelechiidae. It is found in North America, where it has been recorded from Florida.
