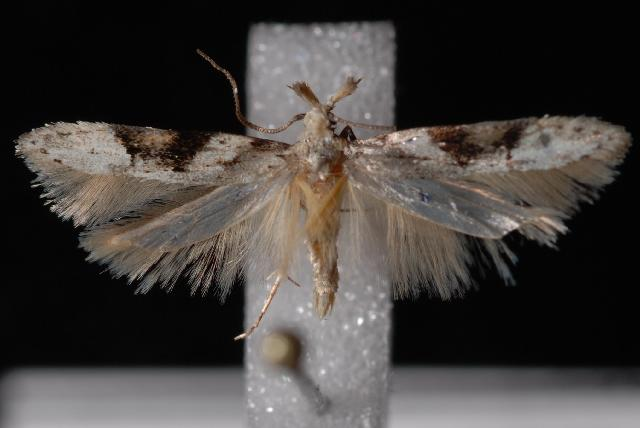

Scientific classification
- Domain: Eukaryota
- Kingdom: Animalia
- Phylum: Arthropoda
- Class: Insecta
- Order: Lepidoptera
- Family: Gelechiidae
- Genus: Coleotechnites
- Species: C. atrupictella

Binomial name
- Coleotechnites atrupictella (Dietz, 1900)

Synonyms
- Eucordylea atrupictella Dietz, 1900

= Coleotechnites atrupictella =

Species of moth

Coleotechnites atrupictella is a moth of the family Gelechiidae. It is found in North America, where it has been recorded from Alberta, British Columbia, Indiana, Maine, Massachusetts, Michigan, New Brunswick, Newfoundland, New York, Ontario, Pennsylvania, Saskatchewan and Washington.

== Description ==
The wingspan is 9–10 mm. The forewings have blackish markings, including at the extreme costa, from the base to one-fifth its length, an oblique fascia beginning at one-fifth from the costa and reaching the dorsal margin at one-third, less distinct at the latter, bisinuate externally and shading off gradually to the ground colour at the base. A broad and less oblique fascia is found before the middle, narrowed toward and not attaining the dorsal margin, bi-sinuate toward the base. A third fascia, narrower than the last, at a little less than two-thirds the length, slightly oblique, becoming narrower toward the dorsal margin without attaining it. This fascia is further removed from the base at its costal than at the dorsal extremity and there is a long stripe in the middle of the wing extending from the second fascia through the third and somewhat beyond. There are five larger and several very small and indistinct spots around the apex. The hindwings are pale cinereous. Adults are on wing from April to September in one generation per year.

The larvae feed on the leaves of various conifers, including Picea mariana, Picea engelmannii, Picea rubens, Picea glauca, Pinus contorta, Pinus ponderosa, Tsuga heterophylla, Pseudotsuga menziesii and Abies lasiocarpa. They have a reddish body and a greenish-brown head. Larvae are found in June and July. The species overwinters as an egg.
