= Eucalliathla =

Scientific classification
- Kingdom: Animalia
- Phylum: Arthropoda
- Class: Insecta
- Order: Lepidoptera
- Family: Yponomeutidae
- Genus: Eucalliathla; Clarke, 1967

Species
- See text

Genus of moths

Eucalliathla is a genus of moths of the family Yponomeutidae.

== Species ==
- Eucalliathla candidella - Blanchard, 1852
