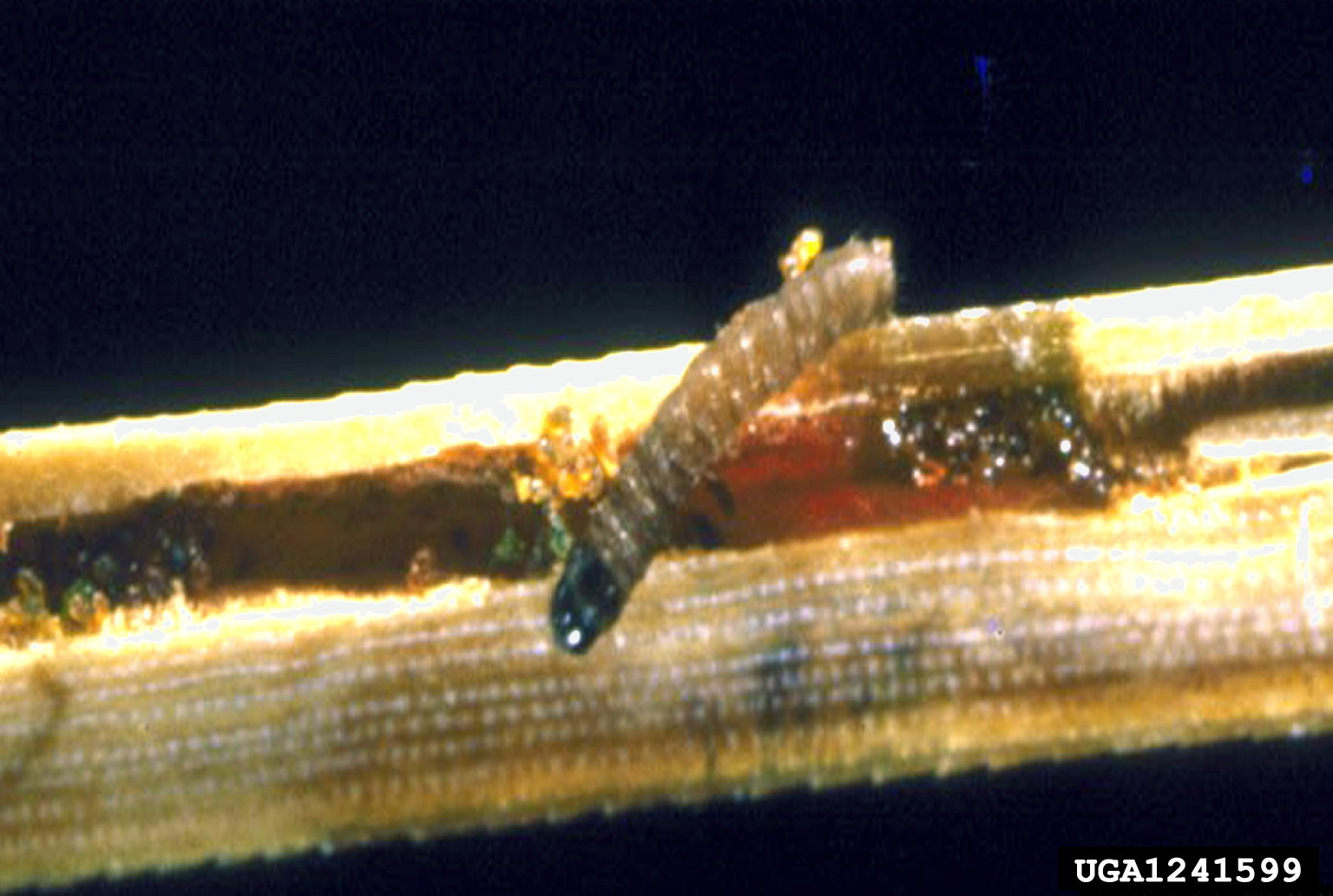

Scientific classification
- Domain: Eukaryota
- Kingdom: Animalia
- Phylum: Arthropoda
- Class: Insecta
- Order: Lepidoptera
- Family: Gelechiidae
- Genus: Coleotechnites
- Species: C. milleri

Binomial name
- Coleotechnites milleri (Busck, 1914)

Synonyms
- Recurvaria milleri Busck, 1914

= Coleotechnites milleri =

Species of moth

Coleotechnites milleri (lodgepole needleminer) is a moth of the family Gelechiidae. It is found in the western parts of the United States, as well as Canada.

The wingspan is 12–15 mm. The forewings are white, strongly and irregularly suffused with black, especially on the costal and apical areas. There is a large, poorly defined, black spot on the costa beyond the middle and a smaller one just before the middle. Opposite the former is an even less well defined dorsal black spot and there are four small tufts of raised black scales, one on the middle of the cell, one at the end of the cell and two below these on the fold. There are also scattered black dots around the apical edge. The hindwings are whitish fuscous.
