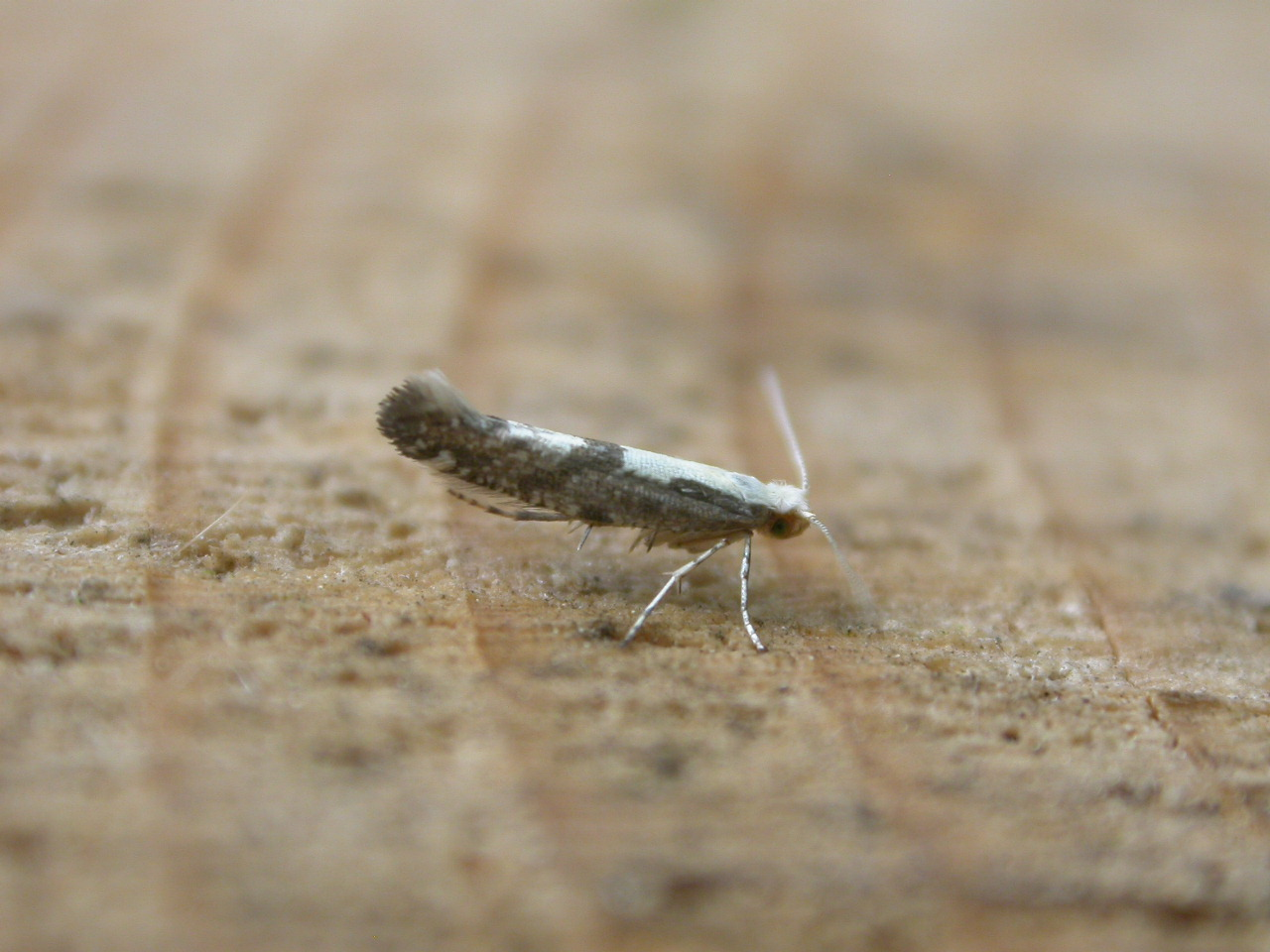
- Argyresthia conjugella

Scientific classification
- Kingdom: Animalia
- Phylum: Arthropoda
- Class: Insecta
- Order: Lepidoptera
- Clade: Neolepidoptera
- Infraorder: Heteroneura
- Clade: Eulepidoptera
- Clade: Ditrysia
- Superfamily: Yponomeutoidea
- Family: Argyresthiidae; Meyrick, 1932

= Argyresthiidae =

Family of moths

Argyresthiidae is a family of moths known as the shiny head-standing moths. It was previously treated as a subfamily of Yponomeutidae.

== Genera ==
- Argyresthia Hübner, [1825]
- Eucalliathla Clarke, 1967
- Paraargyresthia Moriuti, 1969
