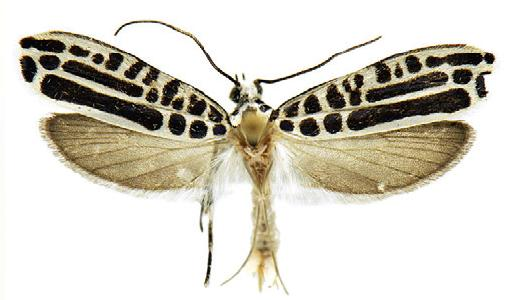

Scientific classification
- Kingdom: Animalia
- Phylum: Arthropoda
- Clade: Pancrustacea
- Class: Insecta
- Order: Lepidoptera
- Family: Attevidae
- Genus: Atteva
- Species: A. zebra

Binomial name
- Atteva zebra Duckworth, 1967

= Atteva zebra =

Species of moth

Atteva zebra is a moth of the family Attevidae. It is known only from Costa Rica and Panama.

The larvae feed on shoot tips of Simarouba amara saplings and adult trees. It is more abundant than Atteva pustulella, but may be found on the same individual tree with A. pustulella and an occasional Atteva aurea in anthropogenic rain forest habitats. It has never been found on Simarouba glauca.
