= A. intermedia =

A. intermedia may refer to:

- Acronicta intermedia, a moth species found in Asia
- Adenanthera intermedia, a legume species found only in the Philippines
- Amethysa intermedia, a picture-winged fly species
- Anaxarcha intermedia, a praying mantis species found in India
- Aniba intermedia, a plant species endemic to Brazil
- Apeiba intermedia, a flowering plant species found only in Suriname
- Ardea intermedia, the intermediate egret, median egret or yellow-billed egret, a heron species found from east Africa across tropical southern Asia to Australia
- Atteva intermedia, a moth species endemic to Antigua

== Synonyms ==
- Acacia intermedia, a synonym for Acacia floribunda, a perennial evergreen shrub or tree species native to New South Wales, Queensland and Victoria
- Acampe intermedia, a synonym for Acampe rigida, an orchid species
- Antheraea intermedia, a synonym for Opodiphthera helena, the Helena gum moth, a moth species found along the eastern coast of Australia
- Asota intermedia, a synonym for Asota plana, a moth species found from the Oriental tropics east to New Guinea

== See also ==
- Intermedia (disambiguation)
