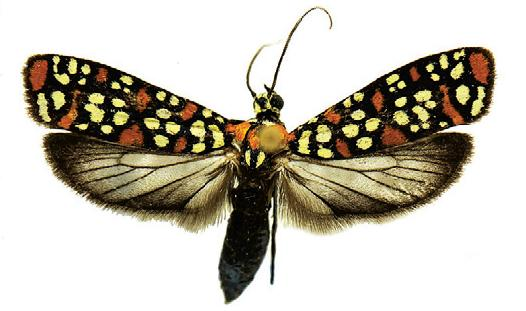

Scientific classification
- Kingdom: Animalia
- Phylum: Arthropoda
- Clade: Pancrustacea
- Class: Insecta
- Order: Lepidoptera
- Family: Attevidae
- Genus: Atteva
- Species: A. pustulella

Binomial name
- Atteva pustulella (Fabricius, 1787)

Synonyms
- Phalaena Tinea punctella Stoll, 1781; Tinea pastulella Fabricius, 1787 (Objective replacement name for Phalaena Tinea punctella Stoll, 1781. The spelling is a printing error for pustulella); Tinea pustulella Fabricius, 1794 (Justified emendation of T. pastulella Fabricius, 1787); Lithosia pustulata Fabricius, 1798; Crameria subtilis Hübner, 1822 (Objective replacement name for Phalaena Tinea punctella Stoll, 1781)

= Atteva pustulella =

Species of moth

Atteva pustulella, also known as polilla cigarrito arlequín or little cigarette harlequin moth, is a moth of the family Attevidae. It is found from Costa Rica, where it meets Atteva aurea, southwards to Uruguay and Argentina. It is also present in the Antilles. There are also several reports from Dominica, Jamaica, Haiti and Martinique.

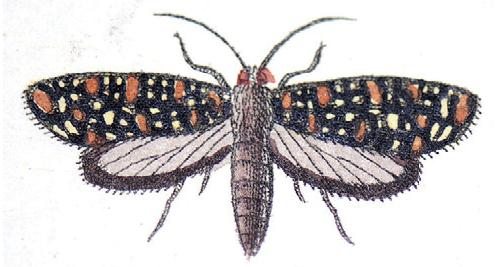
The original figure of Atteva punctella from Plate 372 in Stoll (1781). The illustration is 25 mm wide in the work

The larvae feed only on new shoots of Simarouba amara. There are records for Ailanthus altissima in Argentina (Berg 1880), Castela erecta in Saint Croix, Antilles (Walsingham, 1914), Castela peninsularis, Castela polyandra and Castela emory in the United States (Powell et al. 1973), but these are doubtful records for which either the host or the moth species may be misidentified (Becker 2009).
