= Atteva intermedia =

Scientific classification
- Domain: Eukaryota
- Kingdom: Animalia
- Phylum: Arthropoda
- Class: Insecta
- Order: Lepidoptera
- Family: Attevidae
- Genus: Atteva
- Species: A. intermedia

Binomial name
- Atteva intermedia Becker, 2009

Species of moth

Atteva intermedia is a moth of the Attevidae family. It is endemic to Antigua.

This species is an intermediate between Atteva fulviguttata and Atteva gemmata, differing from the former by the presence of white dots on forewings and thorax and from the latter by the reduced number of these dots.

== Etymology ==
It is named in reference to its pattern, intermediate between Atteva fulviguttata and Atteva gemmata.
