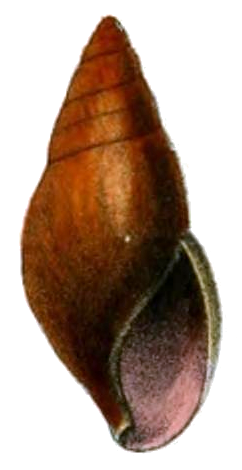
- Drawing of apertural view of the shell of Pittieria aurantiaca

Scientific classification
- Kingdom: Animalia
- Phylum: Mollusca
- Class: Gastropoda
- Order: Stylommatophora
- Family: Spiraxidae
- Subfamily: Euglandininae
- Genus: Pittieria von Martens, 1901

Diversity
- 14 species

= Pittieria =

Genus of gastropods

Pittieria is a genus of predatory air-breathing land snails, terrestrial pulmonate gastropod mollusks in the family Spiraxidae.

== Distribution ==
The distribution of the genus Pittieria extends from Central Mexico to northern Panama.

== Species ==
Species in the genus Pittieria include:

Subgenus Pittieria Von Martens, 1901 include two species:

- Pittieria bicolor Von Martens, 1901 - type species
- Pittieria pittieri (Von Martens, 1901)

Subgenus Laeviglandina Pilsbry, 1908 include nine species:

- Pittieria aurantiaca (Angas, 1879)
- Pittieria broctontomlini (Pilsbry, 1926)
- Pittieria chiriquiensis (Da Costa, 1900)
- Pittieria decidua (Pfeiffer, 1861)
- Pittieria izabellina (Pfeiffer, 1846)
- Pittieria lanceolata (Von Martens, 1891)
- Pittieria obtusa (Pfeiffer, 1844)
- Pittieria tryoniana Pilsbry, 1908
- Pittieria underwoodi (Fulton, 1897)

Subgenus Shuttleworthia H. B. Baker, 1941 include three species:

- Pittieria ambigua (Pfeiffer, 1856)
- Pittieria arborea H. B. Baker, 1941
- Pittieria difficilis (Crosse and Fischer, 1869)
