= Syncallia =

Scientific classification
- Kingdom: Animalia
- Phylum: Arthropoda
- Clade: Pancrustacea
- Class: Insecta
- Order: Lepidoptera
- Family: Yponomeutidae
- Genus: Syncallia; Guérin-Méneville, 1844

Species
- See text

Genus of moths

Syncallia is a genus of moths of the family Yponomeutidae. It is native to Africa and includes two species.

== Species ==
- Syncallia carteri - Walsingham, 1891
- Syncallia stellata - Guérin-Meneville, 1844
