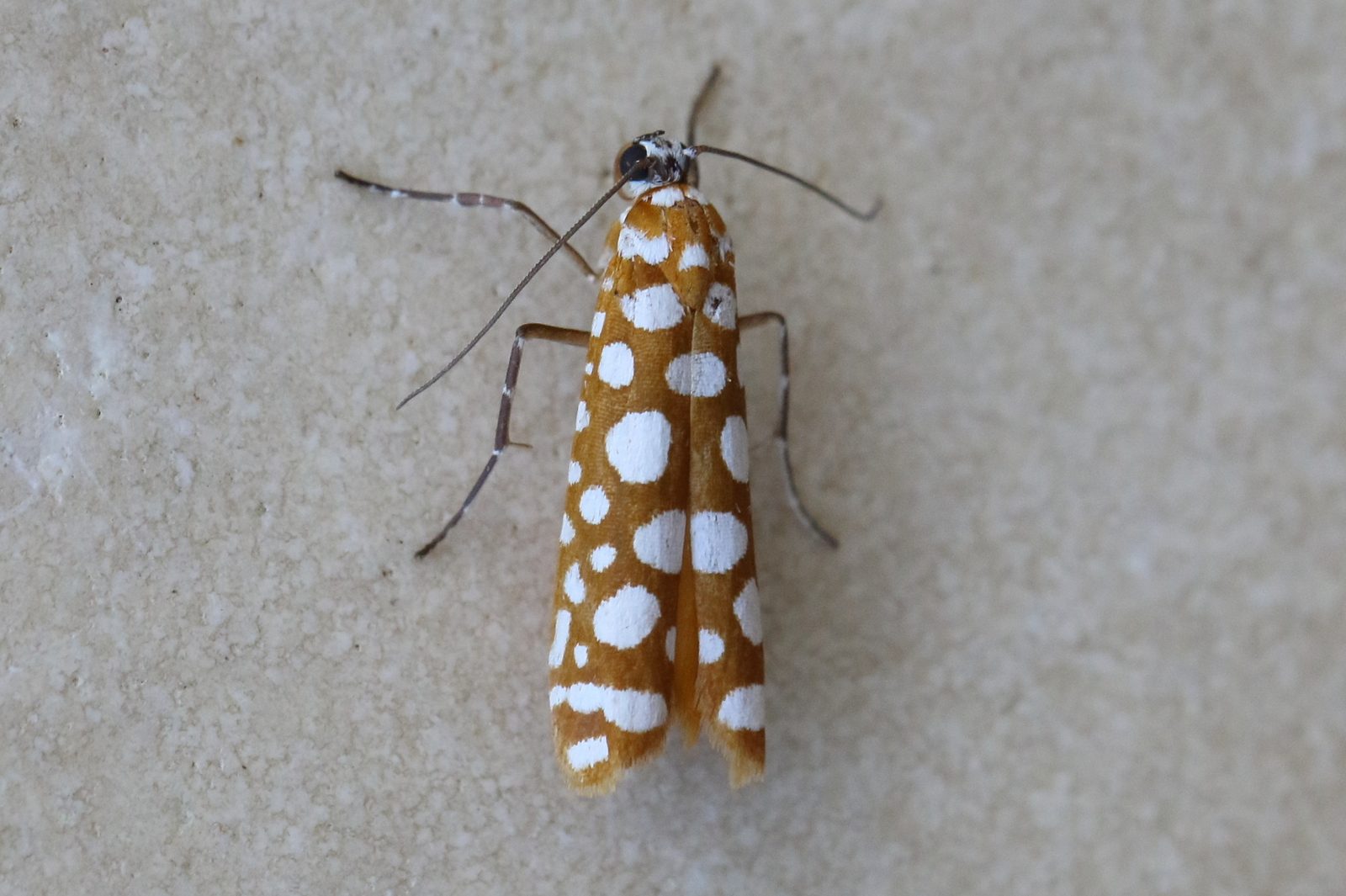

Scientific classification
- Domain: Eukaryota
- Kingdom: Animalia
- Phylum: Arthropoda
- Class: Insecta
- Order: Lepidoptera
- Family: Attevidae
- Genus: Atteva
- Species: A. niphocosma

Binomial name
- Atteva niphocosma Turner, 1903

Synonyms
- Atteva myriastra Meyrick, 1907

= Atteva niphocosma =

Species of moth

Atteva niphocosma is a moth of the family Attevidae. It is found in the Australian states of New South Wales, Queensland and northern Western Australia.

The wingspan is about 30 mm.

The larvae live communally in a web spun amongst the foliage of Polyscias murrayi and pupate more or less exposed in the web.
