= Syncallia stellata =

Scientific classification
- Kingdom: Animalia
- Phylum: Arthropoda
- Clade: Pancrustacea
- Class: Insecta
- Order: Lepidoptera
- Family: Yponomeutidae
- Genus: Syncallia
- Species: S. stellata

Binomial name
- Syncallia stellata Guérin-Méneville, 1844

Species of moth

Syncallia stellata is a species of moth in the family Attevidae. It was described by Félix Édouard Guérin-Méneville in 1844. This species has been documented in western and central Africa.
