= Atteva flavivitta =

Scientific classification
- Kingdom: Animalia
- Phylum: Arthropoda
- Class: Insecta
- Order: Lepidoptera
- Family: Attevidae
- Genus: Atteva
- Species: A. flavivitta

Binomial name
- Atteva flavivitta (Walker, 1866)

Synonyms
- Carthara flavivitta Walker, 1866

Species of moth

Atteva flavivitta is a moth of the family Attevidae. It is only known from Isla Margarita in Venezuela.
