= Atteva zebrina =

Scientific classification
- Domain: Eukaryota
- Kingdom: Animalia
- Phylum: Arthropoda
- Class: Insecta
- Order: Lepidoptera
- Family: Attevidae
- Genus: Atteva
- Species: A. zebrina

Binomial name
- Atteva zebrina Becker, 2009

Species of moth

Atteva zebrina is a moth of the Attevidae family. It is found in Brazil.
