= Atteva numeratrix =

Scientific classification
- Kingdom: Animalia
- Phylum: Arthropoda
- Class: Insecta
- Order: Lepidoptera
- Family: Attevidae
- Genus: Atteva
- Species: A. numeratrix

Binomial name
- Atteva numeratrix Meyrick, 1930

Species of moth

Atteva numeratrix is a moth of the family Attevidae. It is found in Brazil.
