= Atteva megalastra =

Scientific classification
- Kingdom: Animalia
- Phylum: Arthropoda
- Class: Insecta
- Order: Lepidoptera
- Family: Attevidae
- Genus: Atteva
- Species: A. megalastra

Binomial name
- Atteva megalastra Meyrick, 1907

Species of moth

Atteva megalastra is a moth of the family Attevidae. It is found in Australia.
