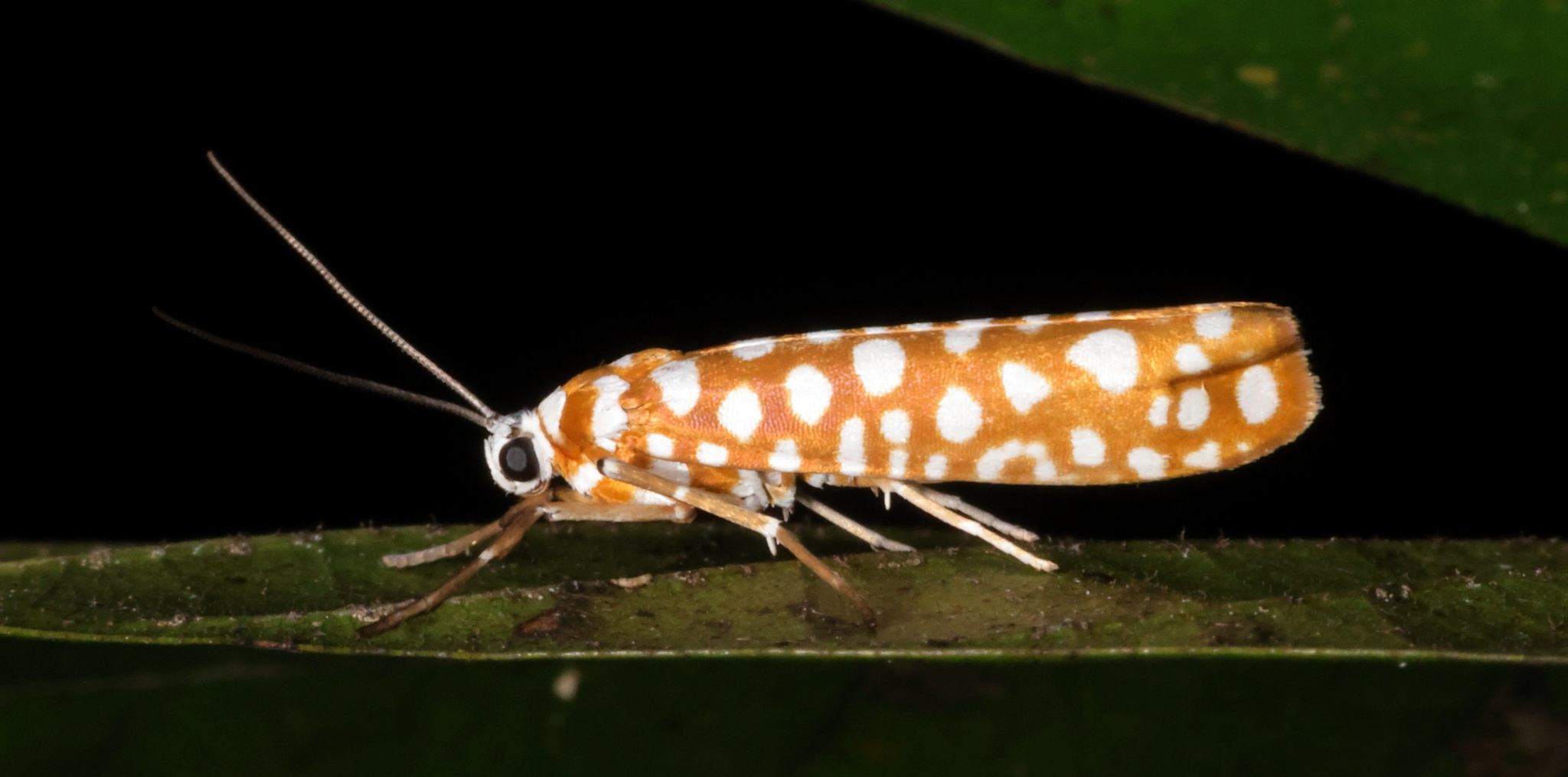

Scientific classification
- Kingdom: Animalia
- Phylum: Arthropoda
- Class: Insecta
- Order: Lepidoptera
- Family: Attevidae
- Genus: Atteva
- Species: A. wallengreni

Binomial name
- Atteva wallengreni Sohn & Wu, 2013

= Atteva wallengreni =

Species of moth

Atteva wallengreni is a moth of the Attevidae family. It is found in China (Guangdong, Hainan, Hongkong and Shaanxi), Indonesia (Bali), Malaysia (Perak), Thailand and Vietnam.

Its forewings are about 11–15 mm long. They are orange with many white dots. Some dots join together to make short bar-like marks. The hindwings are also orange, and semitransparent near to the base.

== Etymology ==
The species is named after Hans Daniel Johan Wallengren, the Swedish entomologist who described this species under the name Amblothridia fabricella.
