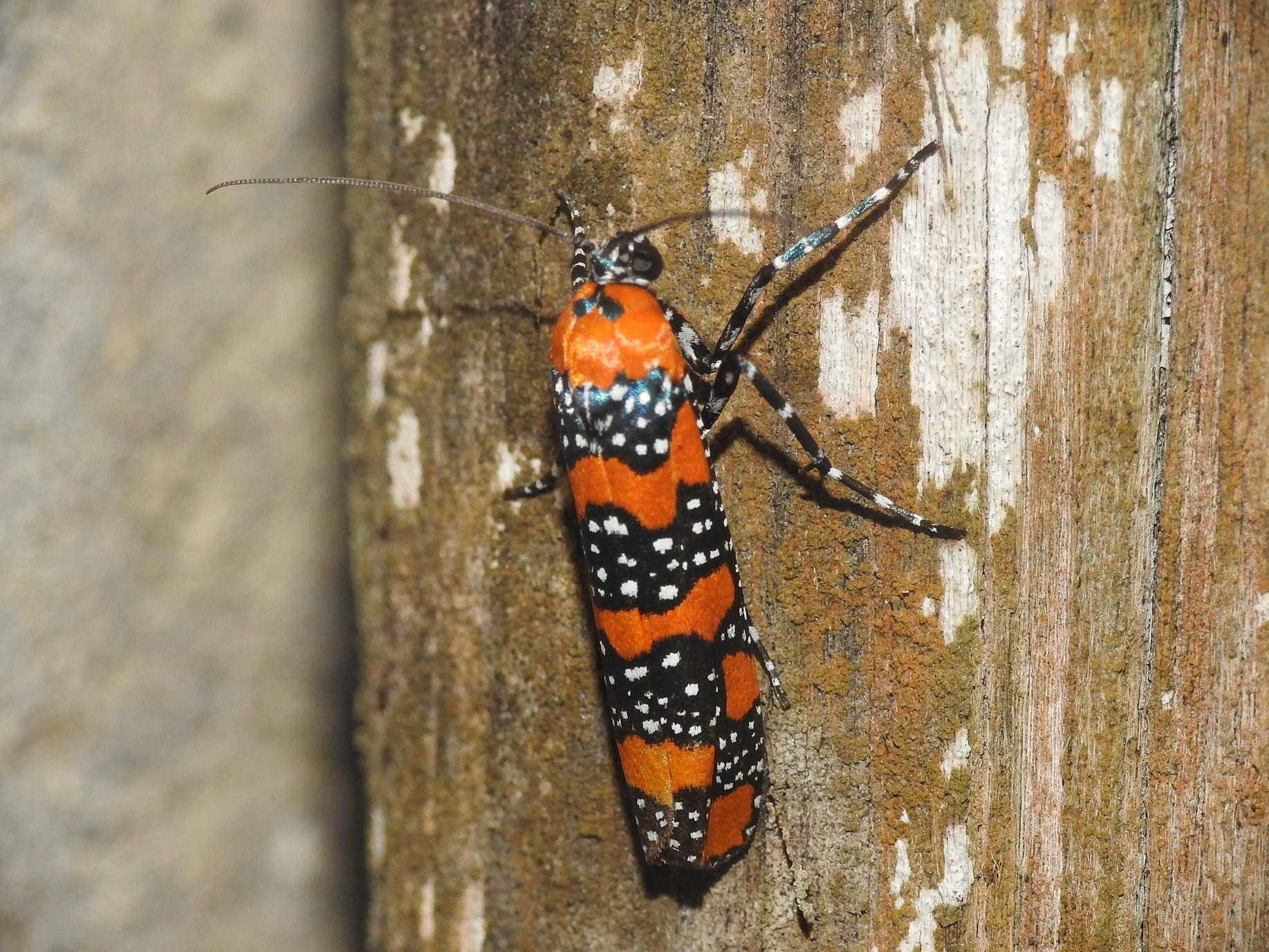

Scientific classification
- Kingdom: Animalia
- Phylum: Arthropoda
- Clade: Pancrustacea
- Class: Insecta
- Order: Lepidoptera
- Family: Attevidae
- Genus: Atteva
- Species: A. rawlinsi

Binomial name
- Atteva rawlinsi Becker, 2009

= Atteva rawlinsi =

Species of moth

Atteva rawlinsi is a moth of the Attevidae family. It is endemic to the Dominican Republic.
