= Atteva cosmogona =

Scientific classification
- Kingdom: Animalia
- Phylum: Arthropoda
- Class: Insecta
- Order: Lepidoptera
- Family: Attevidae
- Genus: Atteva
- Species: A. cosmogona

Binomial name
- Atteva cosmogona Meyrick, 1931

Species of moth

Atteva cosmogona is a moth of the family Attevidae. It is found in the Atlantic Forest of Brazil.
