= Atteva siderea =

Scientific classification
- Domain: Eukaryota
- Kingdom: Animalia
- Phylum: Arthropoda
- Class: Insecta
- Order: Lepidoptera
- Family: Attevidae
- Genus: Atteva
- Species: A. siderea

Binomial name
- Atteva siderea (Walsingham, 1892)

Synonyms
- Oeta siderea Walsingham, 1892

Species of moth

Atteva siderea is a moth of the family Attevidae. It is endemic to the Dominican Republic.
