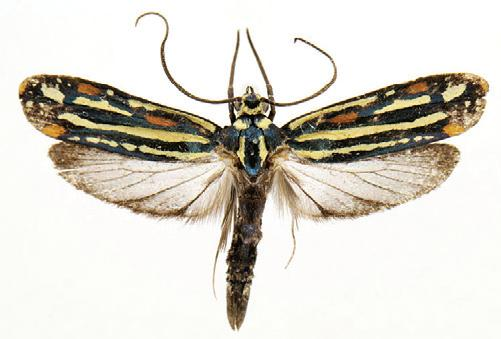

Scientific classification
- Kingdom: Animalia
- Phylum: Arthropoda
- Clade: Pancrustacea
- Class: Insecta
- Order: Lepidoptera
- Family: Attevidae
- Genus: Atteva
- Species: A. hysginiella

Binomial name
- Atteva hysginiella (Wallengren, 1861)

Synonyms
- Amblothridia hysginiella Wallengren, 1861; Cydosia sylpharis Butler, 1877; Atteva monerythyra Meyrick, 1926

= Atteva hysginiella =

Species of moth

Atteva hysginiella is a moth of the family Attevidae. It is endemic to the Galapagos Islands.

The larvae feed on Castela galapageia.
