= Atteva sidereoides =

Scientific classification
- Domain: Eukaryota
- Kingdom: Animalia
- Phylum: Arthropoda
- Class: Insecta
- Order: Lepidoptera
- Family: Attevidae
- Genus: Atteva
- Species: A. sidereoides

Binomial name
- Atteva sidereoides Becker, 2009

Species of moth

Atteva sidereoides is a moth of the Attevidae family. It is endemic to the Dominican Republic.
