= Atteva yanguifella =

Scientific classification
- Domain: Eukaryota
- Kingdom: Animalia
- Phylum: Arthropoda
- Class: Insecta
- Order: Lepidoptera
- Family: Attevidae
- Genus: Atteva
- Species: A. yanguifella

Binomial name
- Atteva yanguifella Sohn & Wu, 2013

Species of moth

Atteva yanguifella is a moth of the Attevidae family. It is found in China (Xizang).

The length of the forewings is 13.5-17.5 mm. The forewings are orange to orange-brown with 25 to 35 white markings scattered throughout. The hindwings are orange.

== Etymology ==
The species name is derived from Yanguifei, one of the four legendary beauties in Chinese history, and refers to the beautiful coloration of the species.
