= Atteva niveigutta =

Scientific classification
- Kingdom: Animalia
- Phylum: Arthropoda
- Class: Insecta
- Order: Lepidoptera
- Family: Attevidae
- Genus: Atteva
- Species: A. niveigutta

Binomial name
- Atteva niveigutta Walker, 1854

Species of moth

Atteva niveigutta is a species of moth in the family Attevidae. It is found in Bangladesh, India (Assam), Thailand and possibly China.

The length of the forewings is 13–16 mm. The forewings are lustrous and orange, with about 27 to 53 white dots, some fused to form dashes especially on the distal and dorsal areas, the dots near the costa smaller. The hindwings are orange.

The larvae feed on Ailanthus excelsus.
