= Atteva charopis =

Scientific classification
- Domain: Eukaryota
- Kingdom: Animalia
- Phylum: Arthropoda
- Class: Insecta
- Order: Lepidoptera
- Family: Attevidae
- Genus: Atteva
- Species: A. charopis

Binomial name
- Atteva charopis Turner, 1903

Species of moth

Atteva charopis is a moth of the family Attevidae. It is found in Australia.
