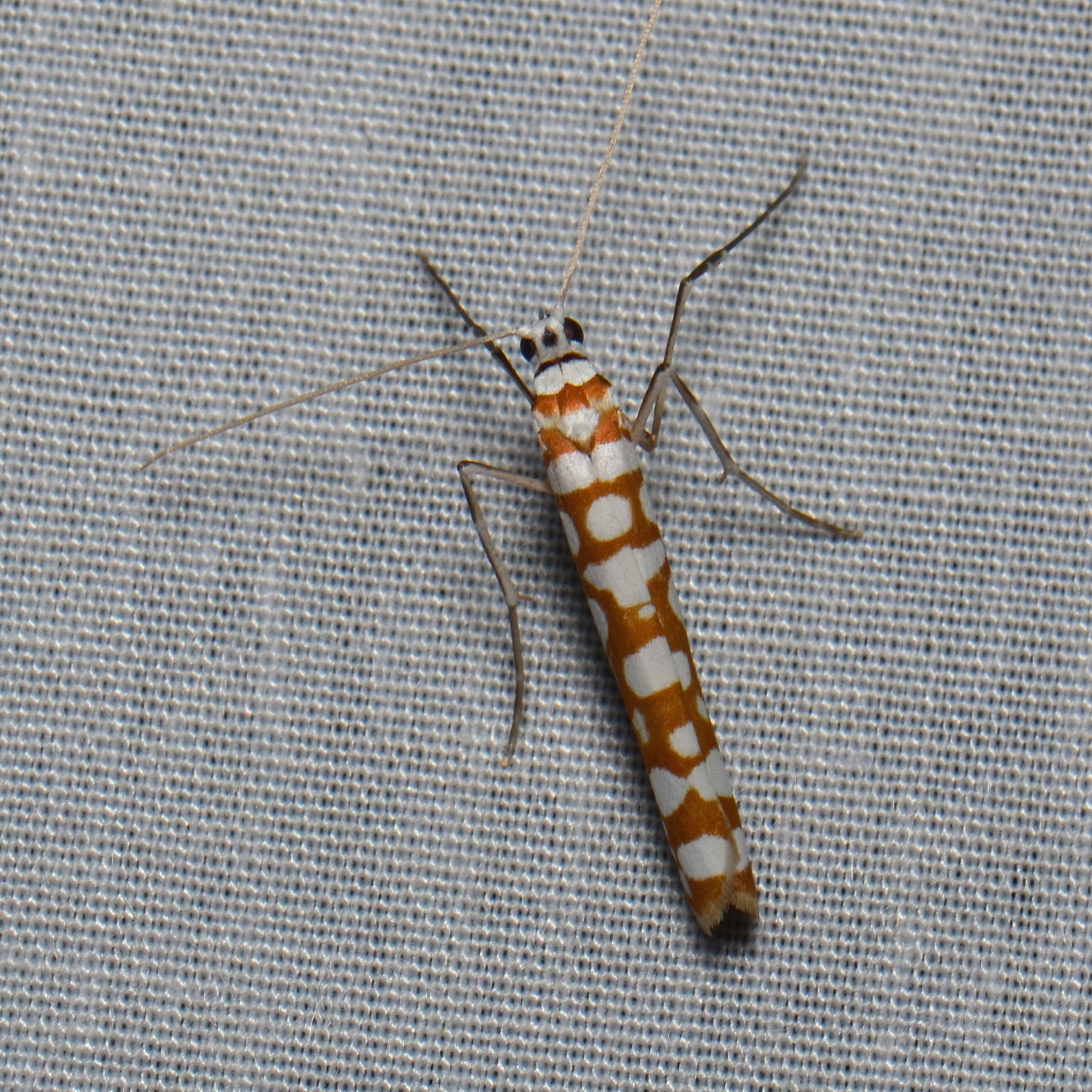

Scientific classification
- Kingdom: Animalia
- Phylum: Arthropoda
- Class: Insecta
- Order: Lepidoptera
- Family: Attevidae
- Genus: Atteva
- Species: A. fabriciella

Binomial name
- Atteva fabriciella (Swederus, 1787)

Synonyms
- Phalaena (Tinea) fabriciella Swederus, 1787; Atteva brucea Moore, [1859]; Corinea niviguttella Walker, 1863

= Atteva fabriciella =

Ailanthus webworm moth

Species of moth

Atteva fabriciella, the Ailanthus webworm moth, is a species of moth in the family Attevidae. It is found in China, India and Sri Lanka. It is considered one of deadliest plant pests on Ailanthus species.

== Reproduction ==
Females are nocturnal, remained concealed during the day. Small pale green eggs are laid either as single or small groups, usually on young buds and tender leaves. Incubation lasts from 2–3 days according to the season, and emerge 1st instar larva. There are five larval instars, where the larval period may be 13–20 days. Fifth matured larva constructs a loose cocoon and pupates. Color of the pupa changes from orange brown to pale yellow brown. The pupal stage completes after 4–14 days.
