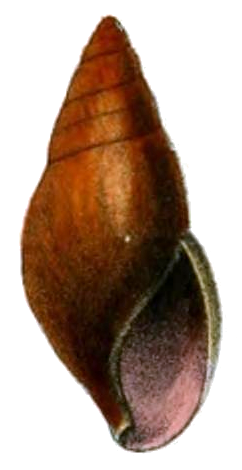
- Drawing of apertural view of the shell of Pittieria aurantiaca

Scientific classification
- Kingdom: Animalia
- Phylum: Mollusca
- Class: Gastropoda
- Order: Stylommatophora
- Family: Spiraxidae
- Genus: Pittieria
- Species: P. aurantiaca

Binomial name
- Pittieria aurantiaca (Angas, 1879)

Synonyms
- Euglandina aurantiaca Angas, 1879 Oleacina aurantiaca

= Pittieria aurantiaca =

Species of gastropod

Pittieria aurantiaca is a species of predatory air-breathing land snail, a terrestrial pulmonate gastropod mollusk in the family Spiraxidae.

This species was described based on only one specimen. This specimen was collected by William More Gabb (1839-1878) in Costa Rica, and the species was described under the name Euglandina aurantiaca by George French Angas in 1879, after Gabb's death. The species was subsequently moved to the genus Pittieria, which was created by Eduard von Martens in 1901.

This snail is carnivorous but it also eats honeydew while that substance is being produced by a species of lantern bug. A species of carpenter ant has been observed climbing onto the head of the snail in order to steal some of the honeydew while the snail is feeding in this way.

== Distribution ==
The type locality of Pittieria aurantiaca was described as "from the hilly country", in Costa Rica. It is now known to occur in the following countries and areas:

- Costa Rica:
  - North-eastern Costa Rica: Puerto Viejo de Sarapiquí, San Miguel
  - Eastern Costa Rica: Turrialba, Tuis, 500-650 m.a.s.l., Santa Clara, 200–500 m.a.s.l., Cordillera de Talamanca
  - South-western Costa Rica: Valley of Baca, Terraba
- Panama: Bocas del Toro

== Description ==
The shell of Pittieria aurantiaca is fusiformly oblong, moderately thin and smooth. The surface is shiny. The color is a bright tawny orange, darker towards the base of the columella. The shell has 5½ slightly convex whorls. The spire is papillose and obtuse. The suture has a dark purple colour and is impressed. The columella is slightly oblique, shortly truncated in front. The outer lip is moderately arcuate, simple, not effuse towards the base. The aperture is elliptically oblong and is a pale rosy purple within. The aperture covers half of the length of the shell.

The width of the shell is 13 mm. The height of the shell is 29–30 mm. The height of the aperture is 15–16 mm.

== Ecology ==
All Spiraxidae are thought to be carnivorous.

Pittieria aurantiaca has been observed to feed on honeydew produced and ejected by Enchophora sanguinea (a lantern bug in the family Fulgoridae). This is thought to be the first known trophobiotic interaction between a gastropod and an insect. It was also observed that sometimes ants of an undescribed species in the genus Camponotus (JTL-005, JTL-005 on AntWeb, on Ants of Costa Rica) positioned themselves on the head of the snail in order to "steal" (kleptotrophobiosis) honeydew from the head of the snail. The snail did not appear to be disturbed in any way by this behavior of the ants.
