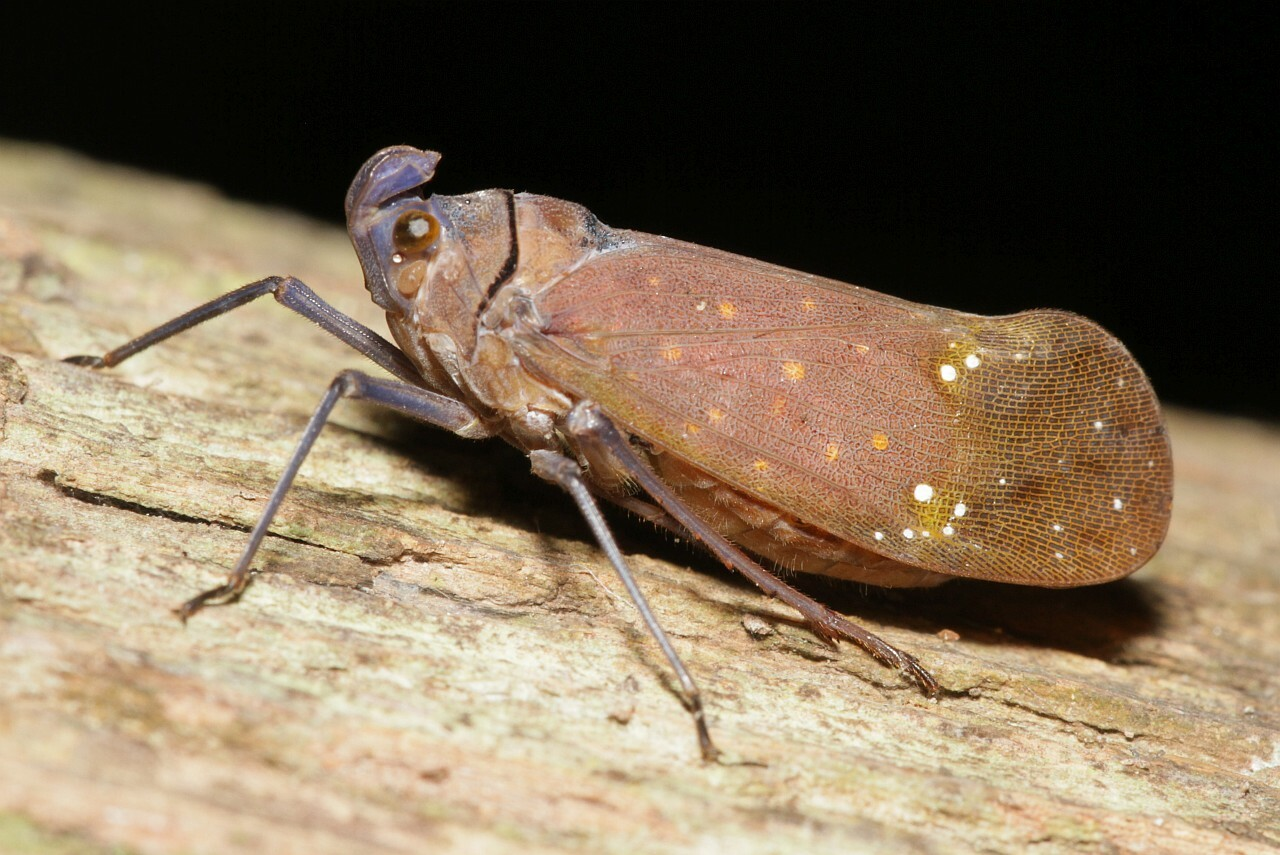
- Enchophora nigromaculata

Scientific classification
- Domain: Eukaryota
- Kingdom: Animalia
- Phylum: Arthropoda
- Class: Insecta
- Order: Hemiptera
- Suborder: Auchenorrhyncha
- Infraorder: Fulgoromorpha
- Family: Fulgoridae
- Subfamily: Aphaeninae
- Tribe: Enchophorini
- Genus: Enchophora; Spinola, 1839

= Enchophora =

Genus of insects

Enchophora is a genus of fulgorid planthoppers in the family Fulgoridae. There are more than 25 described species in Enchophora, found in Mexico, Central America, and South America.

== Species ==
These 21 species belong to the genus Enchophora:

- Enchophora antoinei Bleuzen & Porion, 2004
- Enchophora fuscomaculata Lallemand, 1956
- Enchophora leae Bleuzen & Porion, 2004
- Enchophora lecromi Bleuzen & Porion, 2004
- Enchophora maculata O'Brien, 1991
- Enchophora myriamae Bleuzen & Porion, 2004
- Enchophora nigromaculata Distant, 1906
- Enchophora pallidipunctata Lallemand, 1966
- Enchophora prasina Gerstaecker, 1895
- Enchophora pyrrhocrypta Walker, 1851
- Enchophora recurva (Olivier, 1791)
- Enchophora rosacea Distant, 1887
- Enchophora sanguiflua Audibert & Porion, 2016
- Enchophora sanguinea Distant, 1887
- Enchophora soulai Bleuzen & Porion, 2004
- Enchophora stillifera (Stål, 1862)
- Enchophora subviridis Distant, 1887
- Enchophora tuba (Germar, 1830)
- Enchophora tuberculata Olivier, 1791
- Enchophora uniformis O'Brien, 1991
- Enchophora viridipennis Spinola, 1839

Note: Enchophora ensifera was shifted to Fulgoridae incertae sedis

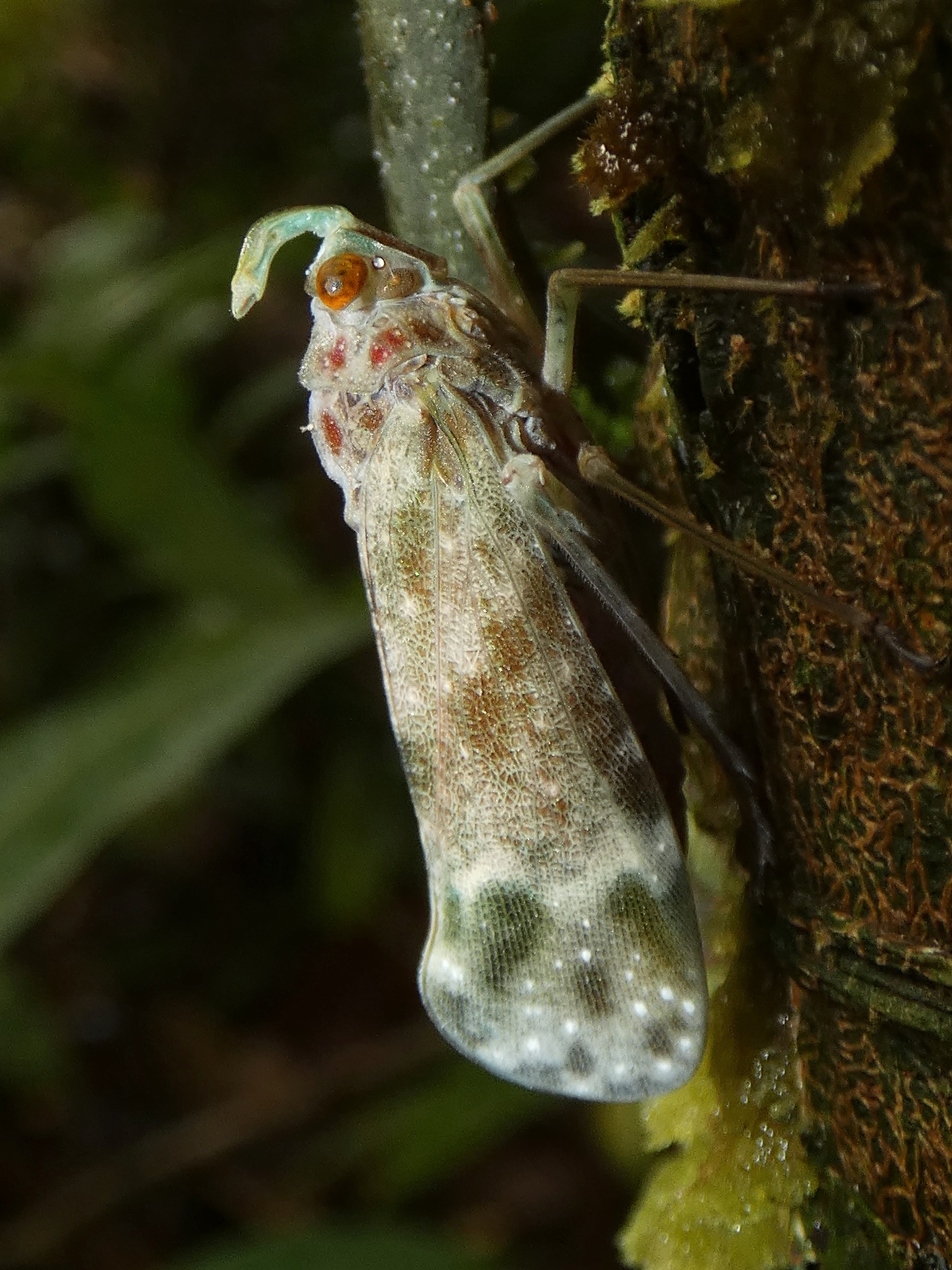
Enchophora sanguinea, Panamá

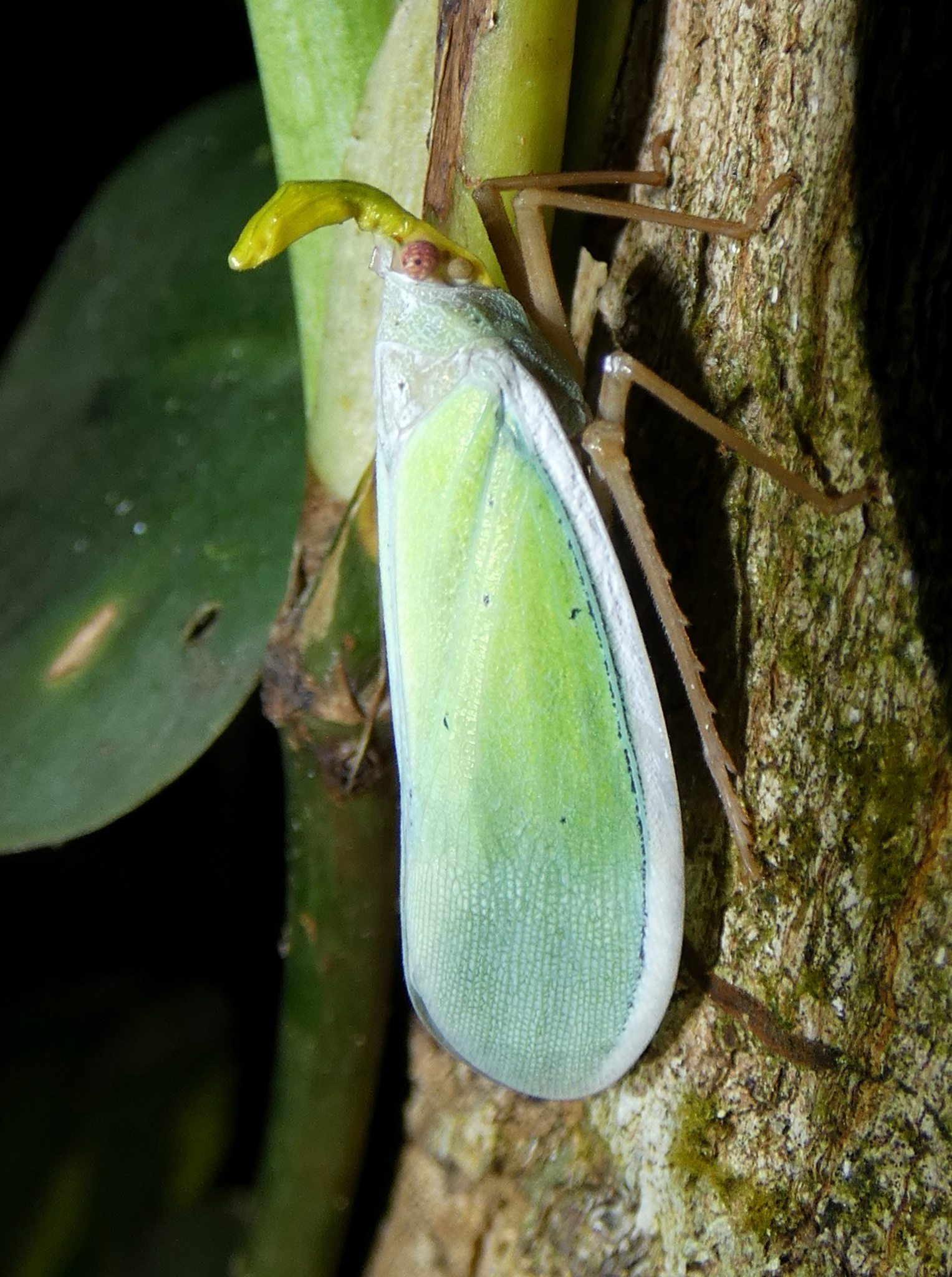
Enchophora prasina, Panamá

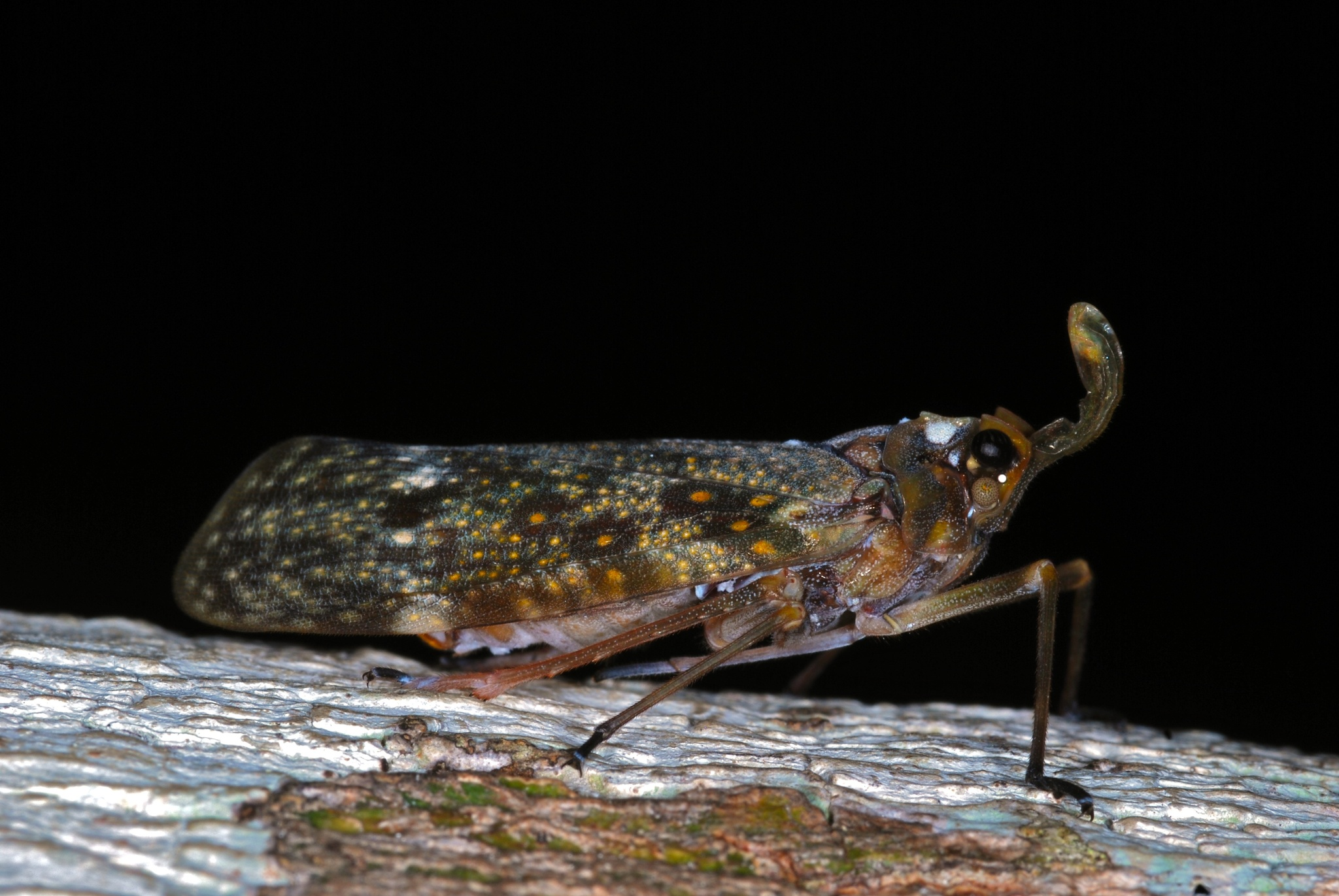
Enchophora sanguiflua, Belize

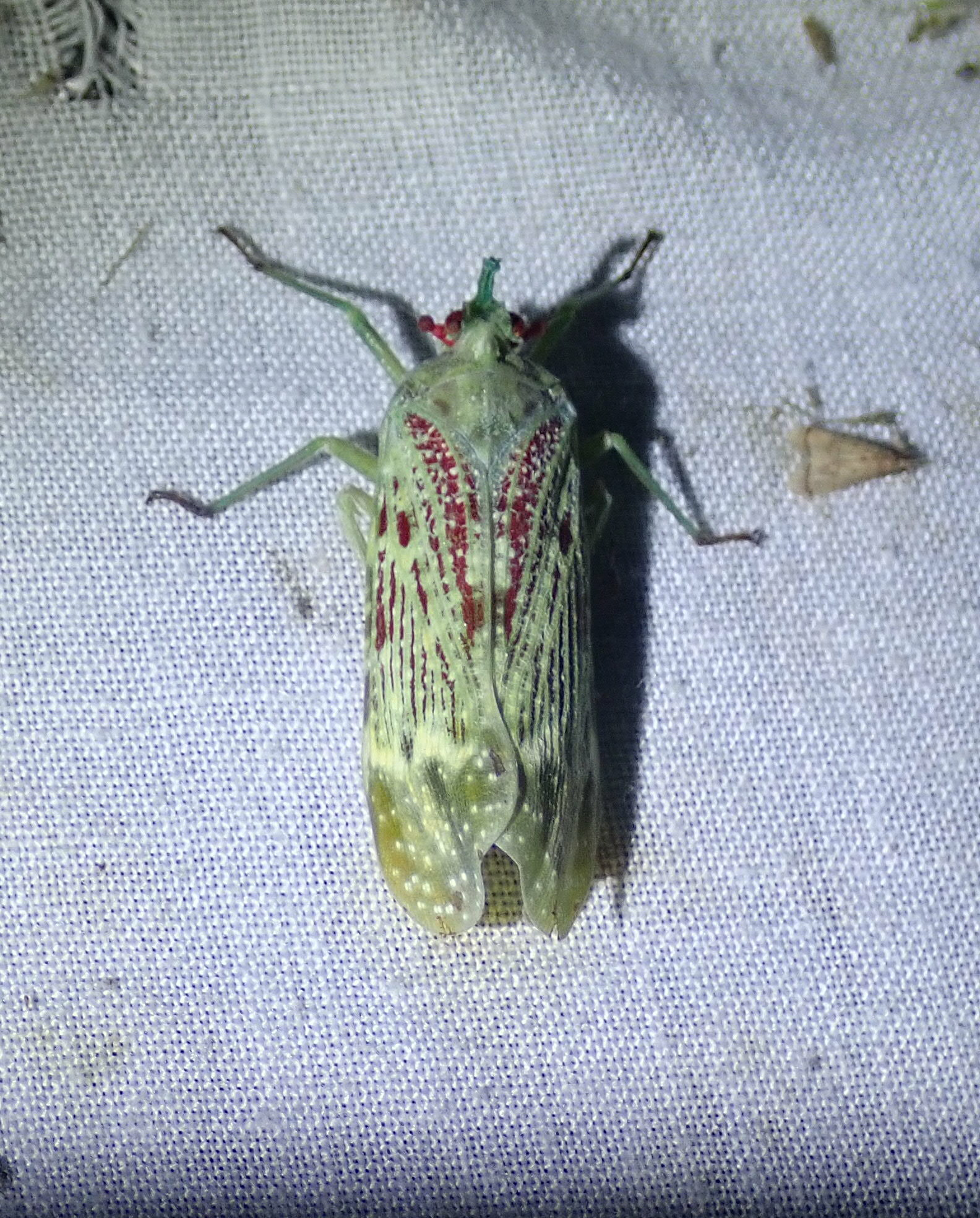
Enchophora rosacea, Costa Rica

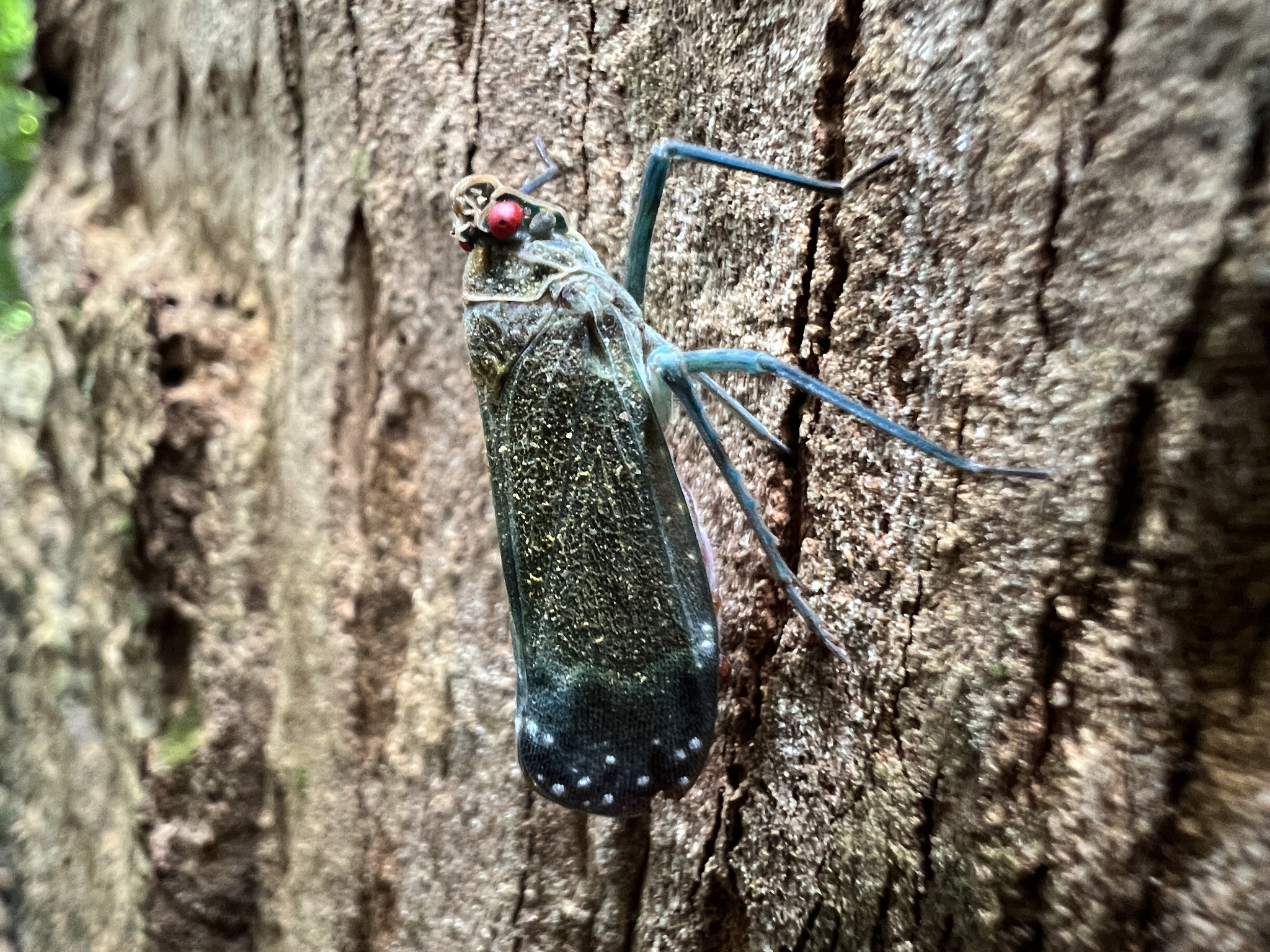
Enchophora subviridis, Costa Rica

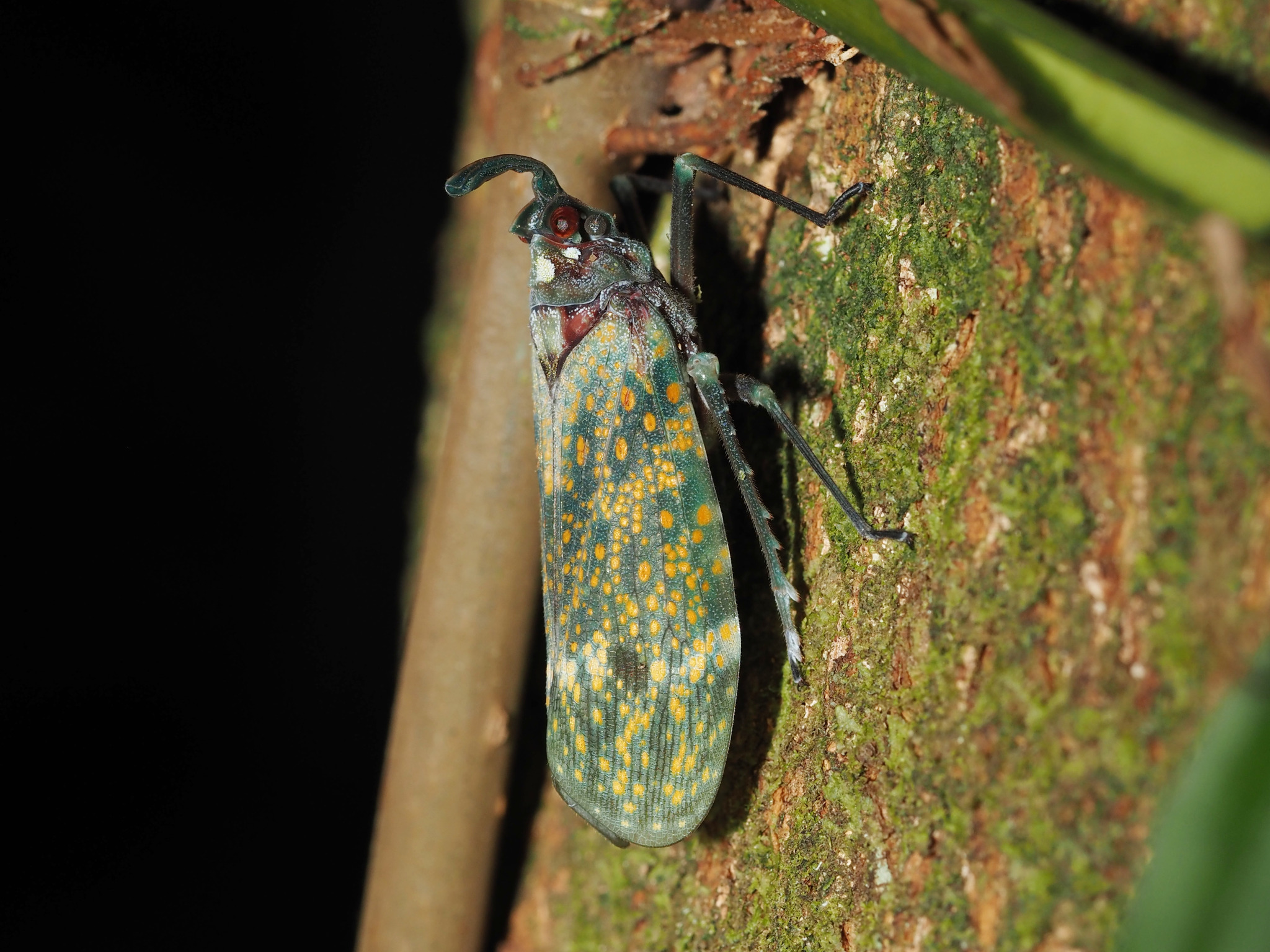
Enchophora stillifera, Costa Rica

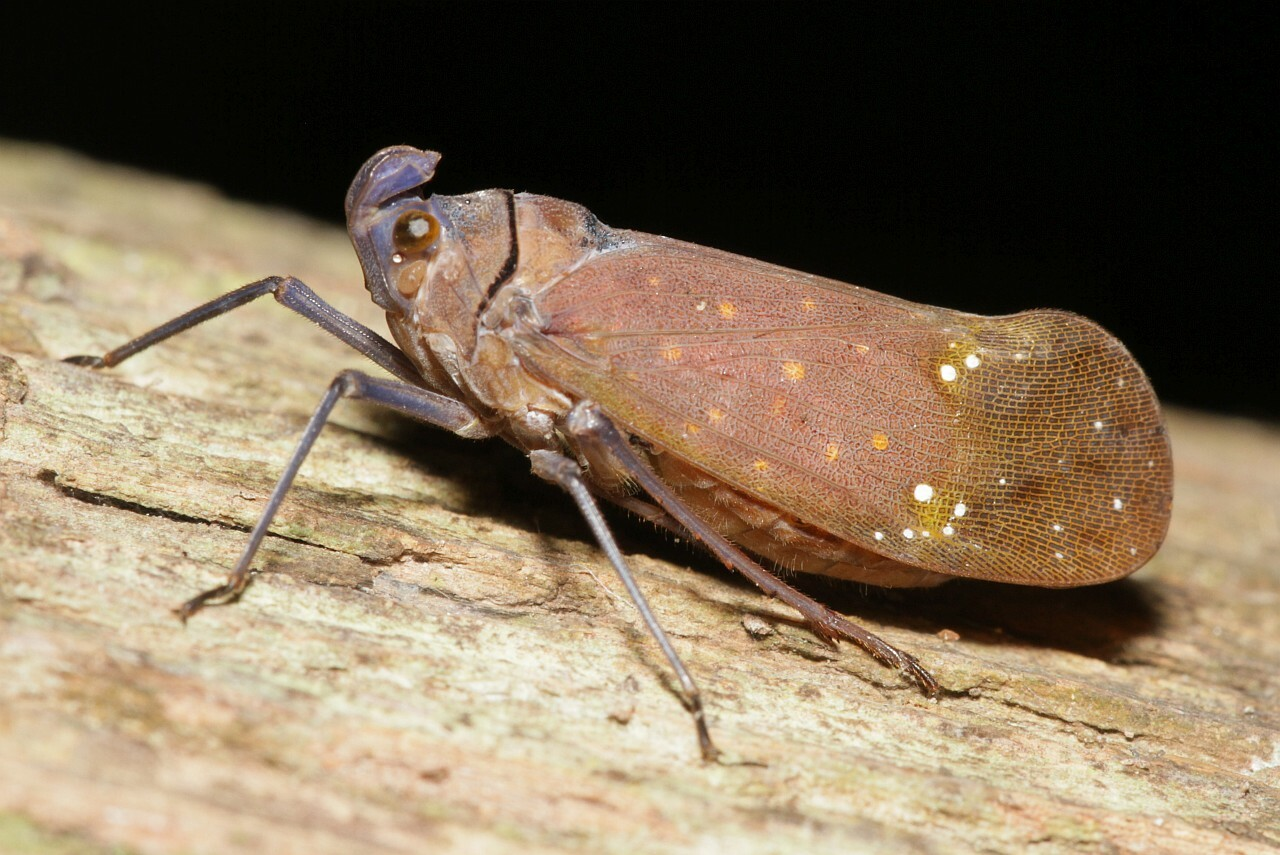
Enchophora nigromaculata, Perú

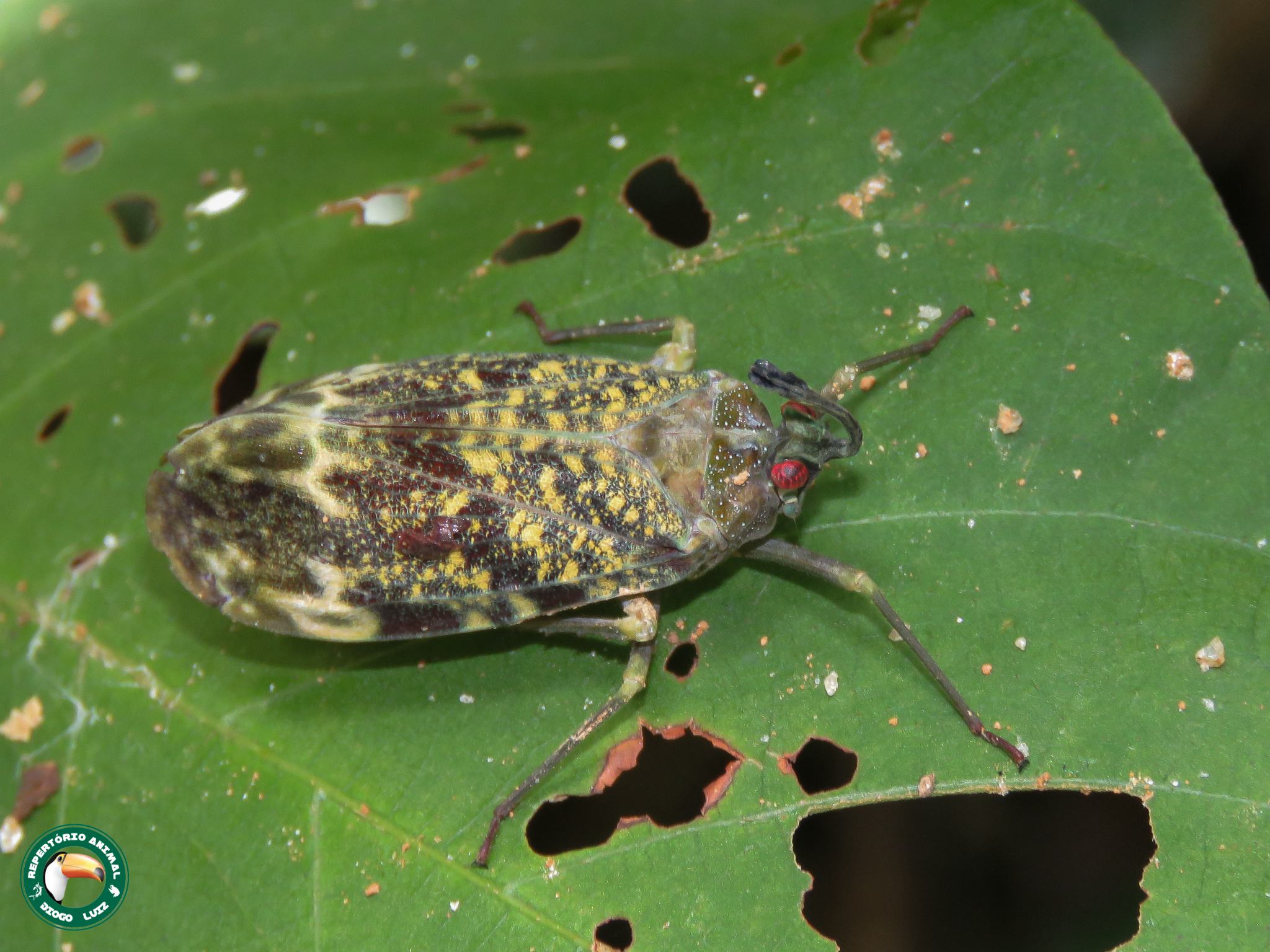
Enchophora recurva, Brasil

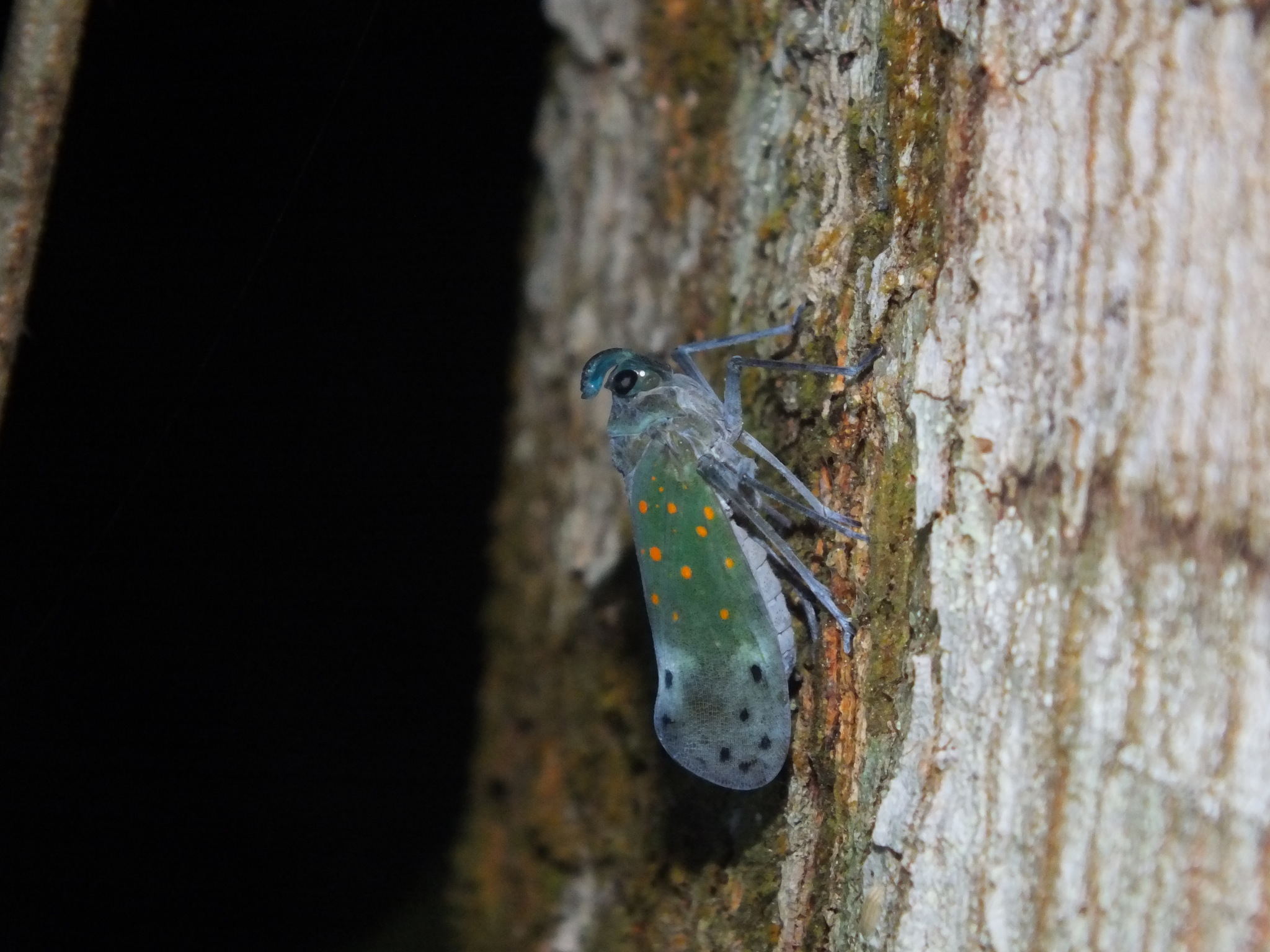
Enchophora leae, Perú

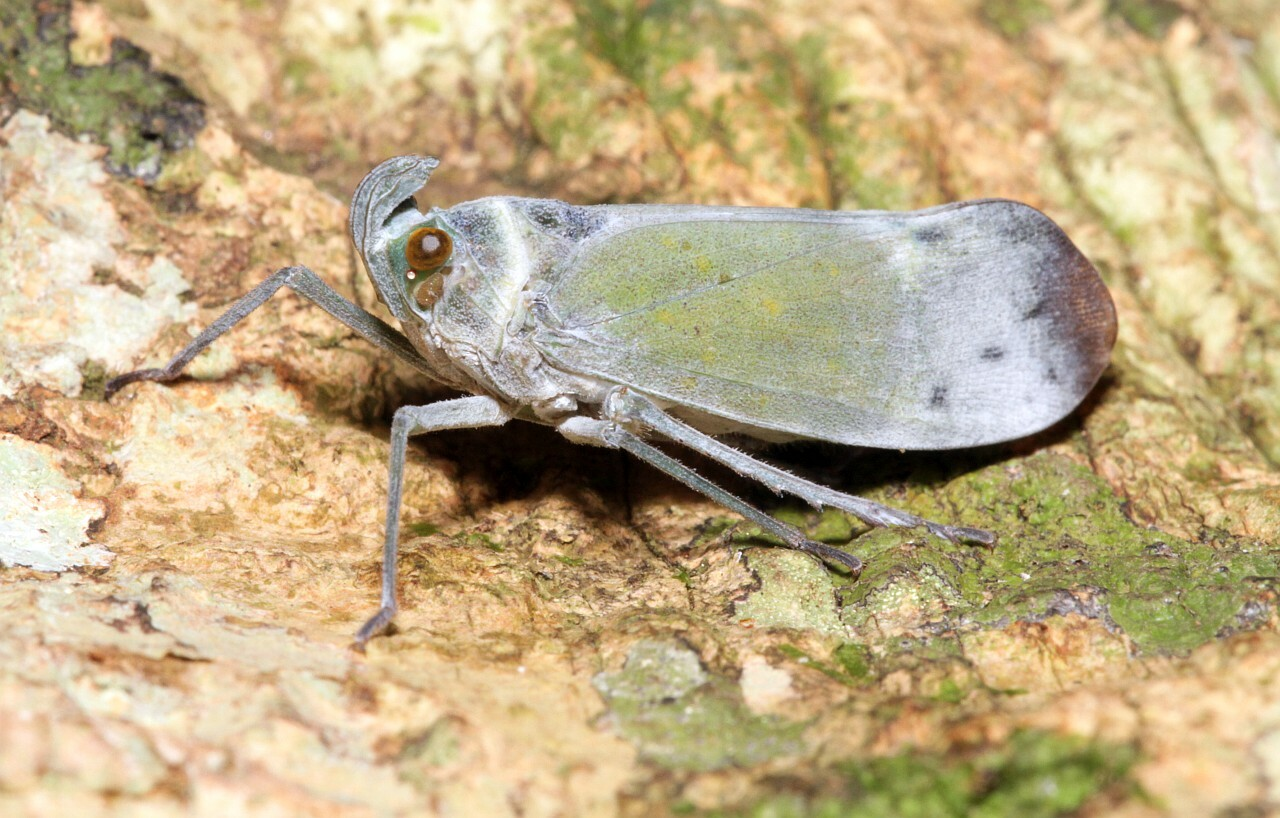
Enchophora pallidipunctata, Perú
