= Atteva albiguttata =

Scientific classification
- Kingdom: Animalia
- Phylum: Arthropoda
- Clade: Pancrustacea
- Class: Insecta
- Order: Lepidoptera
- Family: Attevidae
- Genus: Atteva
- Species: A. albiguttata

Binomial name
- Atteva albiguttata (Zeller, 1873)

Synonyms
- Oeta albiguttata Zeller, 1873

Species of moth

Atteva albiguttata is a moth of the family Attevidae. It is found in Australia.

The larvae cause significant damage to an as yet undescribed and rare Quassia species (family Simaroubaceae).
