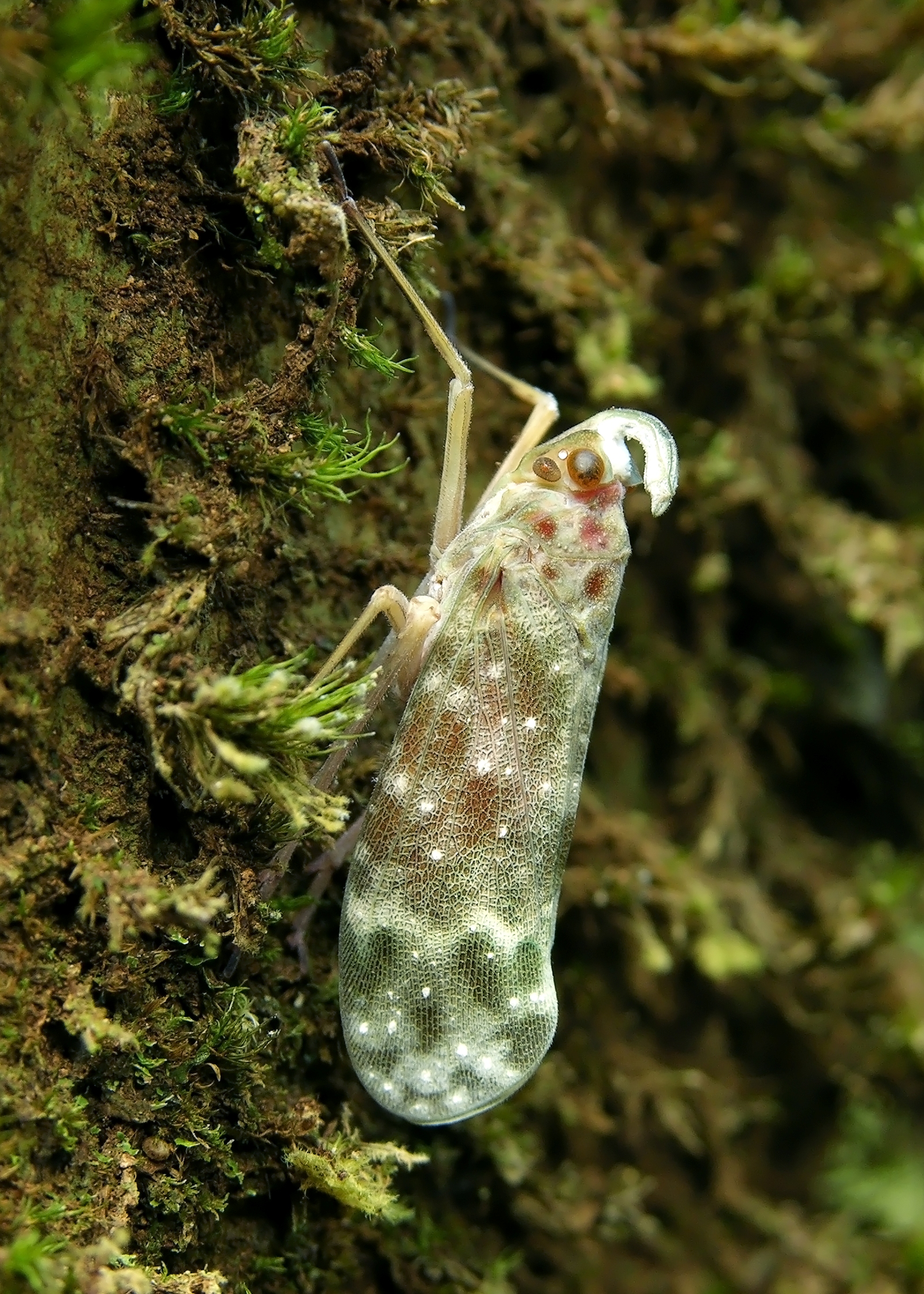

Scientific classification
- Domain: Eukaryota
- Kingdom: Animalia
- Phylum: Arthropoda
- Class: Insecta
- Order: Hemiptera
- Suborder: Auchenorrhyncha
- Infraorder: Fulgoromorpha
- Family: Fulgoridae
- Subfamily: Aphaeninae
- Tribe: Enchophorini
- Genus: Enchophora
- Species: E. sanguinea

Binomial name
- Enchophora sanguinea Distant, 1887

Synonyms
- Enchophora florens Enchophora longirostris

= Enchophora sanguinea =

Species of true bug

Enchophora sanguinea is a species of lantern bug, a type of hemipteran, found in Central and South America. It was first described by William Lucas Distant in 1887. They are 25 millimetres (1.0 in) long. Their colour varies, but is normally red to green; they have a scimitar-shaped process on their heads. They feed on the sap of trees, most commonly Simarouba amara, and they excrete honeydew out of their anuses.

Several other animals feed on this honeydew, having what is termed a trophobiotic relationship with this species of bug. An air-breathing land snail, Pittieria aurantiaca feeds on the honeydew, and this relationship is the first observed biotrophic interaction between an insects and a gastropod. Cockroaches have been observed to feed on a wax that covers the wing cases of this lantern bug, and this was the first observed biotrophic interaction involving a cockroach.

== Description ==
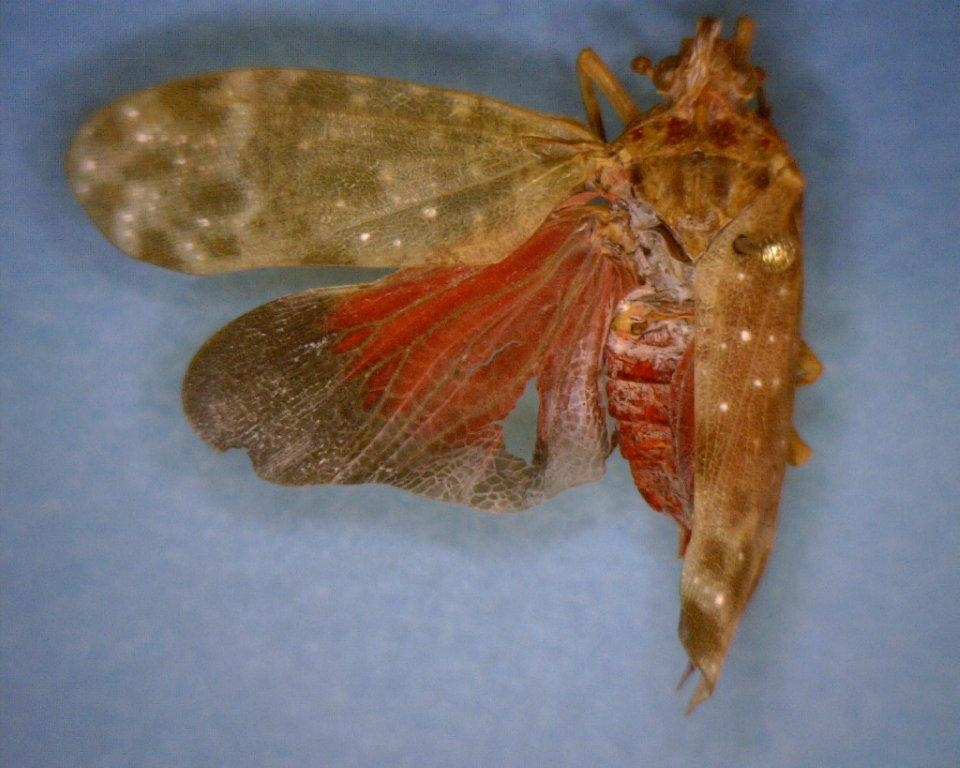
A specimen of Enchophora sanguinea from an insect collection

Enchophora sanguinea are approximately 25 millimetres (1.0 in) in length, with males being slightly smaller than females (22–23 mm verses 24–25 mm). Their colour varies, but is predominantly greenish to reddish. Their tegmina (leathery fore-wings) are also greenish to reddish, but can be darker, and are mottled with orange or red spots but these can fuse to form large areas, the veins are yellow. The tegmina are covered in a white wax, which is thought to help to protect against predators and parasites. Like many lantern flies, their head has a scimitar-shaped process attached to it, but the function of it is unknown. Their wings are red at the base and brown in the posterior. Their abdominal tergites are bright red. They can be distinguished from other Enchophora species with red wings, by the lack of distinctive bands and spots on the pronotum.

== Distribution ==
Enchophora sanguinea is found in Costa Rica, Nicaragua, Panama and Guatemala, Ecuador and Colombia. It is very common at La Selva Biological Station, Costa Rica, feeding on trees, between six and nine metres (20–30 feet) above the ground. On Barro Colorado Island, Panama and at La Selva, they are most commonly found feeding on Simarouba amara, but are also found on Terminalia oblonga and less frequently on Castilla elastica and Ocotea cernua.

== Taxonomy ==
Enchophora sanguinea was first described in 1887 by the English entomologist William Lucas Distant. The type specimen can be found at the Natural History Museum in London. In 1991, Lois O'Brien included two other species that Distant described, E. florens and E. longirostris as being synonymous with E. sanguinea. They have the same male genitalia, and differ only in the patterning of their abdomen.

== Feeding and ecology ==
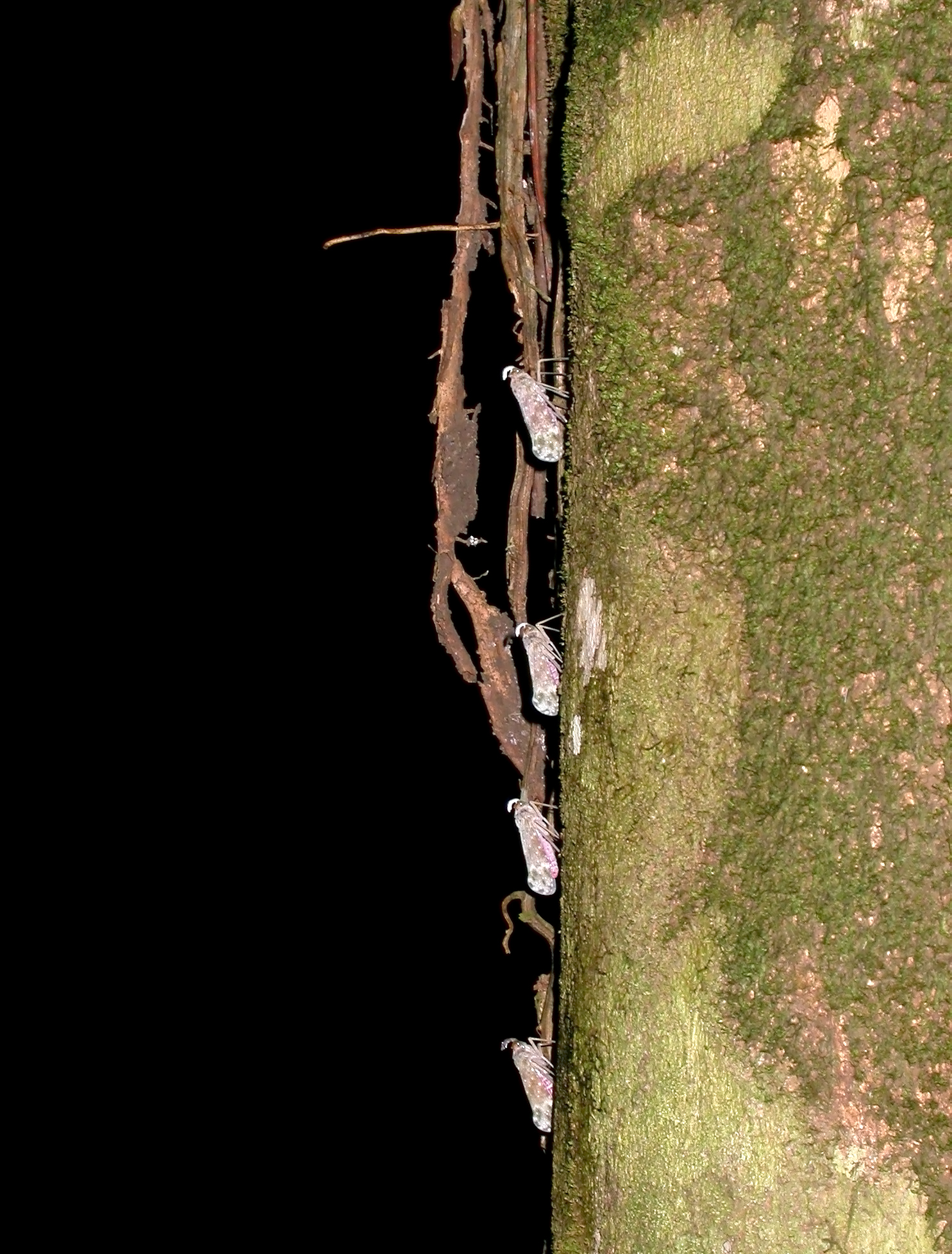
Several E. sanguinea feeding on a tree

Like all lantern bugs, E. sanguinea feeds on the sap in the phloem of plants and excretes honeydew, a liquid containing excess water and carbohydrates. They must eliminate honeydew so as to avoid fungal contamination and attracting predators. They eject honeydew through their anal tube in drops at 0.8 metres (2.6 ft) per second for between three and five seconds, every thirty to sixty seconds. They have been observed to feed both at night and during the day, unlike most lantern bugs which only feed at night. As honeydew still contains nutrients, other animals are attracted to E. sanguinea, intercepting drops of honeydew as they are ejected and feeding on them. Naskrecki and Nishida have observed cockroaches, moths, butterflies, ants and a land snail that have intercepted this honeydew, and which therefore have a trophobiotic relationship with E. sanguinea.

Unidentified species of Eurycotis and Macrophyllodromia cockroaches approach E. sanguinea from behind or the side and position their mouthparts above the tip of their abdomen. They often make physical contact with the bug by touching the bug's wings with their mouthparts or by resting their legs on the wings, but this does not appear to make the bug change its behaviour. Macrophyllodromia species have also been observed feeding on the wax on the bugs tegmina. Along with a similar report of cockroaches feeding on the wax of another lantern bug, Copidocephala guttata, this was the first observed trophobiotic interaction involving cockroaches. Moths tend to approach the bug from the side and position their proboscis so that they can catch flying drops of honeydew. Normally, moths do not make contact with the bug, but Elaeognatha argyritis has been observed to tap the wings of the bug with its antennae, resulting in immediate production of honeydew which it feeds on for 30–60 seconds, before tapping the wings again. Other species of moth observed to feed on the honeydew include Euclystis proba and unidentified species of Platynota, Noctuidae and Tortricidae. The butterfly species, Tigridia acesta has been observed to visit the bug during the day while it is feeding, but no observations of honeydew interception were possible.

The land snail Pittieria aurantiaca (previously known as Euglandina aurantiaca) is a common visitor to E. sanguinea; it positions its foot above the bug's abdomen so that it can intercept honeydew. No physical contact between the snail and the bug has been observed. If the bug moves or changes the direction of the stream of honeydew, the snail is able to reposition itself quickly. It is not known how the snails find the bugs, but the bugs are able to produce vibrational signals, which Naskrecki and Nishida suggested the snails could use as an aid.

An undescribed species of carpenter ant, genus Camponotus (JTL-005) also visits the bug, but is only able to feed when the snail is present, presumably because the ants are too small to be able to feed on the honeydew stream by themselves. The ants climb onto the head of the snail, and then eat some of the honeydew that the snail is attempting to eat, a feeding relationship which can be described as kleptotrophobiosis. The snails appear not to be disturbed by the ants behavior, and continue feeding at a bug for up to four hours. The interaction between the lantern bug and the snail is thought to be the first documented case of a trophobiotic interaction between an insect and a gastropod. It is thought this relationship could have evolved by the snail first feeding on honeydew that collected on leaves beneath the feeding bug, and then following the trail up to find the bug feeding, a similar mechanism to that proposed to explain the formation of similar interactions between ants and homopterans.
