= Atteva fulviguttata =

Scientific classification
- Kingdom: Animalia
- Phylum: Arthropoda
- Clade: Pancrustacea
- Class: Insecta
- Order: Lepidoptera
- Family: Attevidae
- Genus: Atteva
- Species: A. fulviguttata

Binomial name
- Atteva fulviguttata (Zeller, 1873)

Synonyms
- Oeta fulviguttata Zeller, 1873; Syblis glaucopidella Guenée, 1879; Oeta fulviguttella Walsingham, 1892 (misspelling)

Species of moth

Atteva fulviguttata is a moth of the family Attevidae. It is endemic to Jamaica and Hispaniola.
