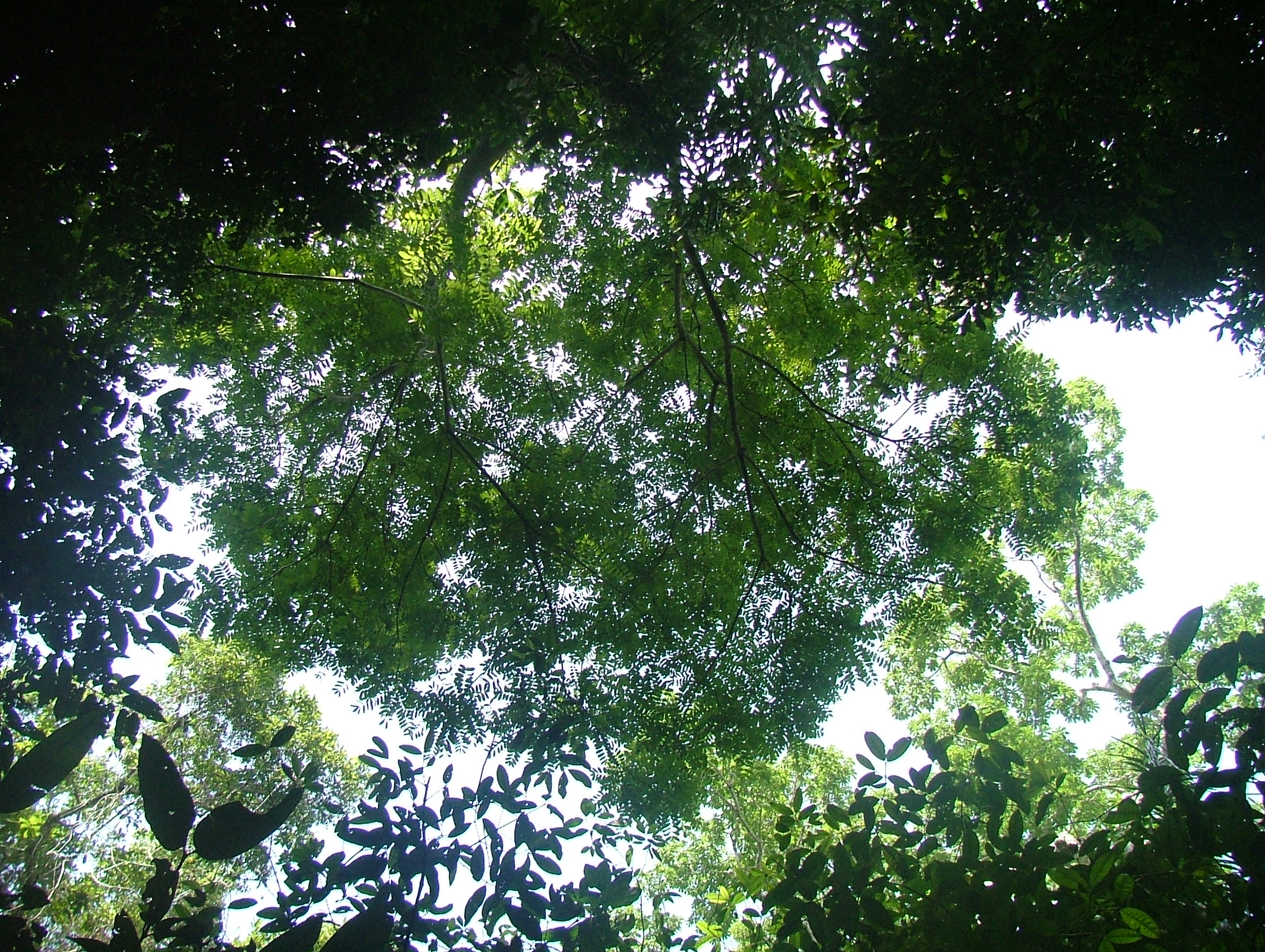
- The canopy of Simarouba amara

Scientific classification
- Kingdom: Plantae
- Clade: Embryophytes
- Clade: Tracheophytes
- Clade: Spermatophytes
- Clade: Angiosperms
- Clade: Eudicots
- Clade: Rosids
- Order: Sapindales
- Family: Simaroubaceae
- Genus: Simarouba
- Species: S. amara

Binomial name
- Simarouba amara Aubl. 1775

Subspecies
- Simarouba amara opaca; Simarouba amara typica

Synonyms
- Quassia simarouba; Quassia simaruba; Zwingera amara; Picraena officinalis

= Simarouba amara =

Species of tree

Simarouba amara is a species of tree in the family Simaroubaceae, found in the rainforests and savannahs of South and Central America and the Caribbean. It was first described by Aubl. in French Guiana in 1775 and is one of six species of Simarouba. The tree is evergreen, but produces a new set of leaves once a year. It requires relatively high levels of light to grow and grows rapidly in these conditions, but lives for a relatively short time. In Panama, it flowers during the dry season in February and March, whereas in Costa Rica, where there is no dry season it flowers later, between March and July. As the species is dioecious, the trees are either male or female and only produce male or female flowers. The small yellow flowers are thought to be pollinated by insects, the resulting fruits are dispersed by animals including monkeys, birds and fruit-eating bats and the seeds are also dispersed by leaf cutter ants.

Simarouba amara has been studied extensively by scientists in an attempt to understand the tree and also to gain a better understanding of the ecology of the rainforest in general. Many of these studies were conducted on Barro Colorado Island in Panama or at La Selva Biological Station in Costa Rica. Of particular interest is how it competes with other species and with individuals of the same species at different stages in its life cycle. The seedlings are normally limited by the amount of light and nutrients found where they are growing and the saplings are considered relatively light demanding compared to other species. Young individuals are more likely to survive when they grow further away from their parents and when there are few other individuals growing near to them, which may be due to them being able to escape diseases. Plant physiologists have investigated how the leaves of the tree differ depending on their location in the forest canopy finding they are thicker in the canopy and thinner in the understory. They have also measured how the water potential of their leaves changes and when their stomata open and close during the day; the findings suggest that rather than closing their stomata to control water loss, it is controlled by the leaf area instead. Population geneticists have examined the way in which its genes vary, at both the local scale and across its range using microsatellites. It is genetically diverse, indicating gene flow occurs between populations and seeds can be dispersed up to 1 km. The leaves of S. amara are eaten by several species of caterpillar, particularly those in the genus Atteva. Several species of termite and ants live on or around the tree and lianas and epiphytes grow on the tree.

The bark of S. amara has been used by people in its range to treat dysentery and diarrhea, as well as other diseases, and was also exported to Europe in the eighteenth century to treat these illnesses. A number of compounds have since been isolated from the bark and have been shown to have antimicrobial effects. Local people use the wood of the tree for various purposes and it is also grown in plantations and harvested for its timber, some of which is exported.

== Description ==
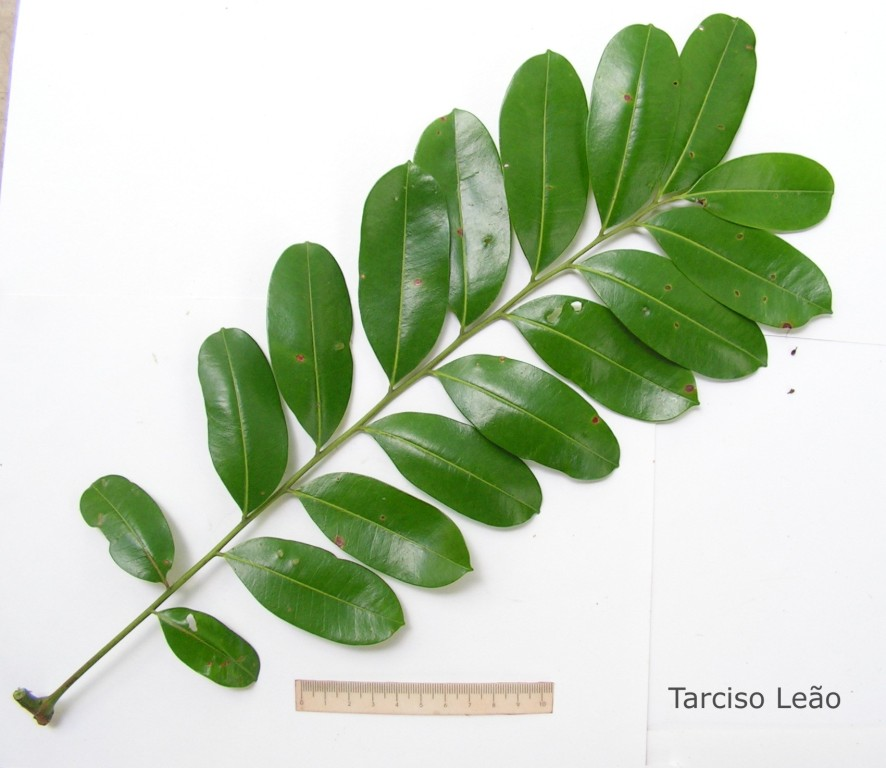
A compound leaf of Simarouba amara

Simarouba amara grows to heights of up to 35 metres (115 ft), with a maximum trunk diameter of 125 cm (49 in) and a maximum estimated age of 121 years. It has compound leaves that are each around 60 cm (24 in) long, the petioles are 4–7 cm long and each leaf has 9–16 leaflets. Each leaflet is 2.5–11 cm long and 12–45 mm wide, with those towards the end of the compound leaf tending to be smaller. The flowers occur on a staminate panicle that is around 30 cm (12 in) in length, which is widely branched and densely covered in flowers. The flowers are unisexual, small (<1 cm long) and pale yellow in colour. They are thought to be pollinated by insects such as small bees and moths. On Barro Colorado Island (BCI), Panama, it tends to flower during the dry season from the end of January to the end of April, persisting for 11 to 15 weeks each year. In Costa Rica, it flowers slightly later, between March and July, peaking in April. Fruits form between 1 and 3 months after pollination occurs. The fruits are brightly colored green to purplish-black, approximately 17 mm long and contain large seeds (10–14 mm), they occur in groups of 3–5 drupes. The seeds cannot stay dormant and are dispersed by vertebrates. Each seed weighs approximately 0.25 g.

It is an evergreen species, with a new flush of leaves growing between January and April, during the dry season, when the highest light levels occur in the rainforest. This phenology is thought to allow S. amara to photosynthesise most effectively, since the new leaves are more efficient than those they replace. It has visible, but indistinct growth rings that are on average 7 mm wide. A study of individuals in Panama found that they grow on average 8.4 mm in diameter each year, in Costa Rica, growth rates as fast as 18 mm per year have been recorded, and the stem grows constantly throughout the year. The xylem vessels in mature trees range from 20 to 90 μm in diameter, with around 50 vessels present per mm^{2} of branch. The density of the wood is between 0.37–0.44 g/cm^{3}, lower than many other species in the rainforest.

It is a fast-growing, light-demanding and shade-intolerant species. Saplings are typically one straight pole, with several compound leaves and only one point of growth. This allows the sapling to achieve the greatest vertical growth with a minimum amount of biomass. They start to branch once they are 2–5 m tall.

A study in the forest dynamics plot on BCI found that between 1982 and 2000, around 65% of individuals died, with mortality highest amongst small individuals (<1 cm dbh). Large trees (>20 cm dbh) are relatively rare, averaging 2.4 trees per hectare, compared to 40 trees per hectare of >1 cm dbh.

== Taxonomy ==
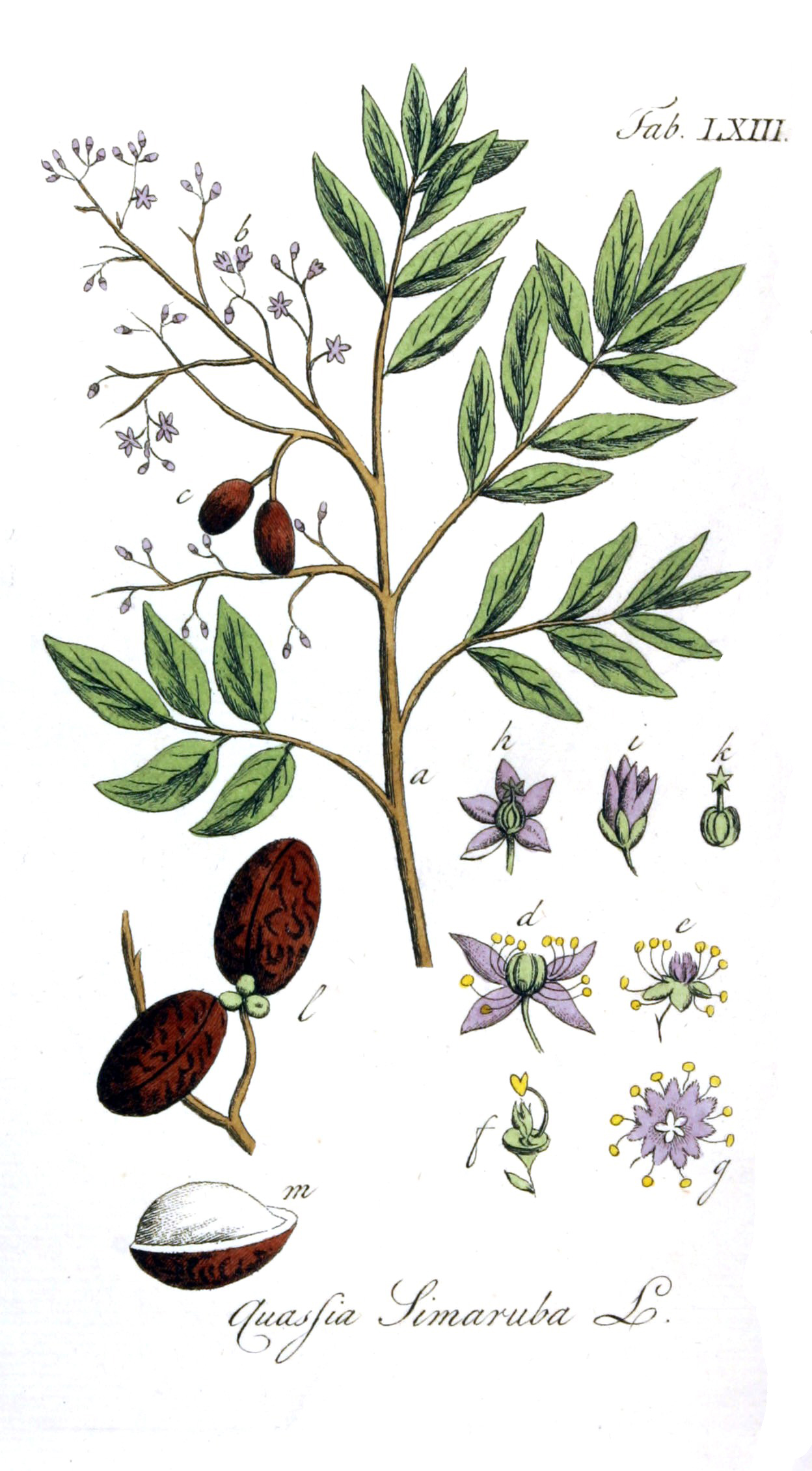
Illustration of S. amara (as Quassia simarouba) drawn by Adolphus Ypey and published in 1813. Note that the flowers are incorrectly coloured and should be yellow.

Simarouba amara was first described by Jean Baptiste Christophore Fusée Aublet in French Guiana in 1775 and is the type species of the genus Simarouba. In 1790, William Wright described Quassia simarouba, which Auguste Pyrame DeCandolle suggested was the same species as S. amara. However, because S. amara was described as monoecious by Aublet and Q. simarouba was described as dioecious by Wright, they were still regarded as separate species in 1829. By 1874, when the Flora Brasiliensis was published, they were considered synonymous.

Among the six species of Simarouba, two besides S. amara occur on the continent: S. glauca and S. versicolor. S. amara can be distinguished from the other continental species by having smaller flowers, anthers and fruit, and straight, rather than curved petals. The leaves of Simarouba amara subsp. opaca are not glaucous (a bluish-grey or green colour) on their underside, whereas those of Simarouba amara subsp. typica are.

Table of the flower characteristics of S. amara and the two other continental Simarouba species
Structure	S. amara	S. glauca	S. versicolor
Flower	3–5 mm long	4–7.5 mm long	4–7.5 mm long
Anthers	0.4–1.2 mm long	1.3–2.0 mm long	1.0–1.5 mm long
Petals	Straight, dull yellow-green to white	Curved, brighter yellow with a touch of orange or red	Curved
Fruits	1.0–1.5 x 0.6–1.0 cm	2.0–2.5 x 1.2–1.5 cm	2.0–2.5 x 1.5–2.0 cm

=== Common names ===
Simarouba amara is known by many common names in the Neotropics. In Bolivia it is known as chiriuana, in Brazil as marupa, marupuaba, parahyba, paraiba and tamanqueira. In Colombia it is called simaruba, in Ecuador as cedro amargo, cuna and guitarro, in French Guiana as simarouba, in Guyana as simarupa, in Peru as marupa, in Surinam as soemaroeba and in Venezuela cedro blanco and simarouba. In Jamaica, it is called damson.

In Europe, it was known by various names during the nineteenth century when it was used as a medicine; these names included bitter ash, bitterwood, mountain damson and stave-wood.

== Distribution ==
The range of Simarouba amara in green

The natural range of S. amara is in the Neotropics, the ecoregion of Central and South America. Its range extends from Guatemala in the north, to Bolivia in the south and from Ecuador in the west, to the east coast of Brazil. It has been introduced to the islands of Dominica and Puerto Rico in the Caribbean Sea, becoming naturalised in Puerto Rico. On BCI, mature trees (>10 cm dbh) are found at a frequency of 5 per hectare, in Ecuador at 0.7 per hectare and in French Guiana at 0.4 per hectare. Genetic analysis of populations suggests that it has always been relatively common within its range. It grows in rainforests and in savannahs. The seedlings of S. amara are rare in primary forest due to their light-demanding habit.

== Genetics ==
Populations of S. amara display high levels of heterozygosity indicating that it is genetically diverse. This is consistent with the tree outcrossing over large distances by long-distance pollen flow and that there has been sufficient long distance gene flow between populations to counteract the effects of genetic drift. A study of 478 plants from 14 populations across South America found that 24% of all alleles occurred in only one population. A study of 300 plants on Barro Colorado Island found that the heterozygosity at 5 microsatellite loci varied between 0.12 and 0.75. 8 out of the 50 alleles scored occurred in only one plant.

== Reproduction ==
Individuals do not typically reproduce until they have a trunk diameter of 30 cm. Once mature, the trees produce flowers each year, but not all females produce fruit each year. Their flower morphology is typical of being pollinated by generalist small insects such as bees and moths. It has been reported to be pollinated by non-sphingid moths, but other authors have questioned whether this is correct.

=== Seed dispersal ===
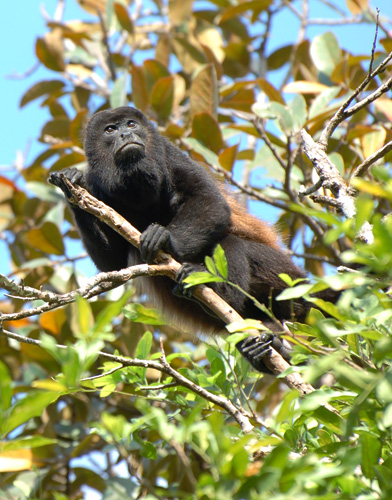
A mantled howler, one animal that disperses the seeds of S. amara

The seeds of S. amara are dispersed by vertebrates, mainly large birds and mammals, including chachalacas, flycatchers, motmots, thrushes, howler monkeys, tamarins and spider monkeys. Leaf cutter ants have also been observed to disperse the seeds and dense seedling carpets form in areas where they dump waste material but most of the seedlings die and dispersal by the ants is thought to be unimportant in determining the long-term patterns of recruitment and dispersal. Seeds that are eaten by monkeys are more likely to germinate than seeds that have not. Fruit-eating phyllostomid bats have also been noted to disperse their seeds; this may aid the regeneration of forests as they disperse the seeds of later successional species while they feed on S. amara.

Based on inverse modelling of data from seed traps on BCI, the estimated average dispersal distance for seeds is 39 m. Studying seedlings and parent trees on BCI using DNA microsatellites revealed that, in fact on average, seedlings grow 392 cm (154 in) away from their parents, with a standard deviation of ±234 m and a range of between 9 m and 1 km. In the forest there are many seeds and seedlings beneath reproductive females; genetic data indicate that seedlings are unlikely to be from nearby adults, but rather dispersed there by vertebrates that have fed on one tree and then moved to feed on another, defecating while in the canopy and depositing the seeds.

== Physiology ==
Various aspects of the physiology or S. amara have been studied. The stomatal conductance of the leaves, an indication of the rate at which water evaporates, of mature trees at midday range from 200 to 270 mmol H_{2}O m^{−2} s^{−1}. The leaf water potentials at midday range from −0.56 to −1.85 MPa, averaging around −1.2 MPa. Cavitation is widespread in the trunk and the stomata do not close before cavitation occurs. Although this would normally be considered deleterious to the tree, it may buffer the leaf water potential and therefore be beneficial. The stomatal conductance and hydraulic conductance of the branches of taller trees (~30 m) are much higher than in the branches of smaller trees (~20 m). Phillips, Bond and Ryan suggested that this is probably due to the branches of taller trees having a lower leaf-to-sapwood ratio than those of small branches. Dye staining shows that cavitation is common in the branches of S. amara. They concluded that water flux in S. amara is controlled by structural (leaf area), rather than physiological (closing stomata) means.

Leaves absorb light in the photosynthetically active radiation (PAR) spectrum at wavelengths between 400 nm and 700 nm with a high efficiency, but the efficiency decreases at longer wavelengths. Generally plants absorb PAR at efficiencies of around 85%; the higher values found in S. amara are thought to be due to the high humidity of its habitat. The reflectance and transmittance of the leaves are low at between 400 and 700 nm. The optical properties and the mass of the leaves vary depending on their location in the forest canopy, with leaves becoming thicker and more efficient as their height within the canopy increases. For their weight, however, leaves in the understory are more efficient at capturing light than leaves in the canopy.

Leaf optical properties as recorded from a study at La Selva, Costa Rica
	Absorbance (400-700 nm)	Absorbance (700-750 nm)	Reflectance (400-700 nm)	Transmittance (400-700 nm)	Leaf mass (g/m^{2})
Understory (~2m)	91.7%	37.3%	6.3%	2.1%	36.9
Mid-canopy (~10m)	92.8%	41.6%	6.1%	1.2%	55.4
Canopy (>20m)	93.1%	46.1%	5.2%	0.5%	135.2

The concentration of bioavailable phosphate has been found to be higher underneath female individuals than underneath males, even though the total concentration of phosphate is equal. Rhoades et al. concluded that this difference was due to females changing the availability of phosphate, rather than females only growing in areas with high phosphate availability. This is thought to be caused either by the fruit containing high levels of phosphate which would fall off the tree and rot, or by the fruits attracting animals which deposit phosphate beneath the females. It is also possible that the sexes produce different root exudates, which affect the microbial community in their rhizosphere, thereby affecting phosphate availability.

The woody tissues of S. amara have been found to respire at a rate of 1.24 μmol CO_{2} m^{−2} s^{−1}, and this rate of respiration correlates positively with the growth rate of the stem. Maintenance respiration was calculated at 31.1 μmol CO_{2} m^{−3} s^{−1} and this rate correlated positively with the sapwood volume.

=== Seedling physiology ===
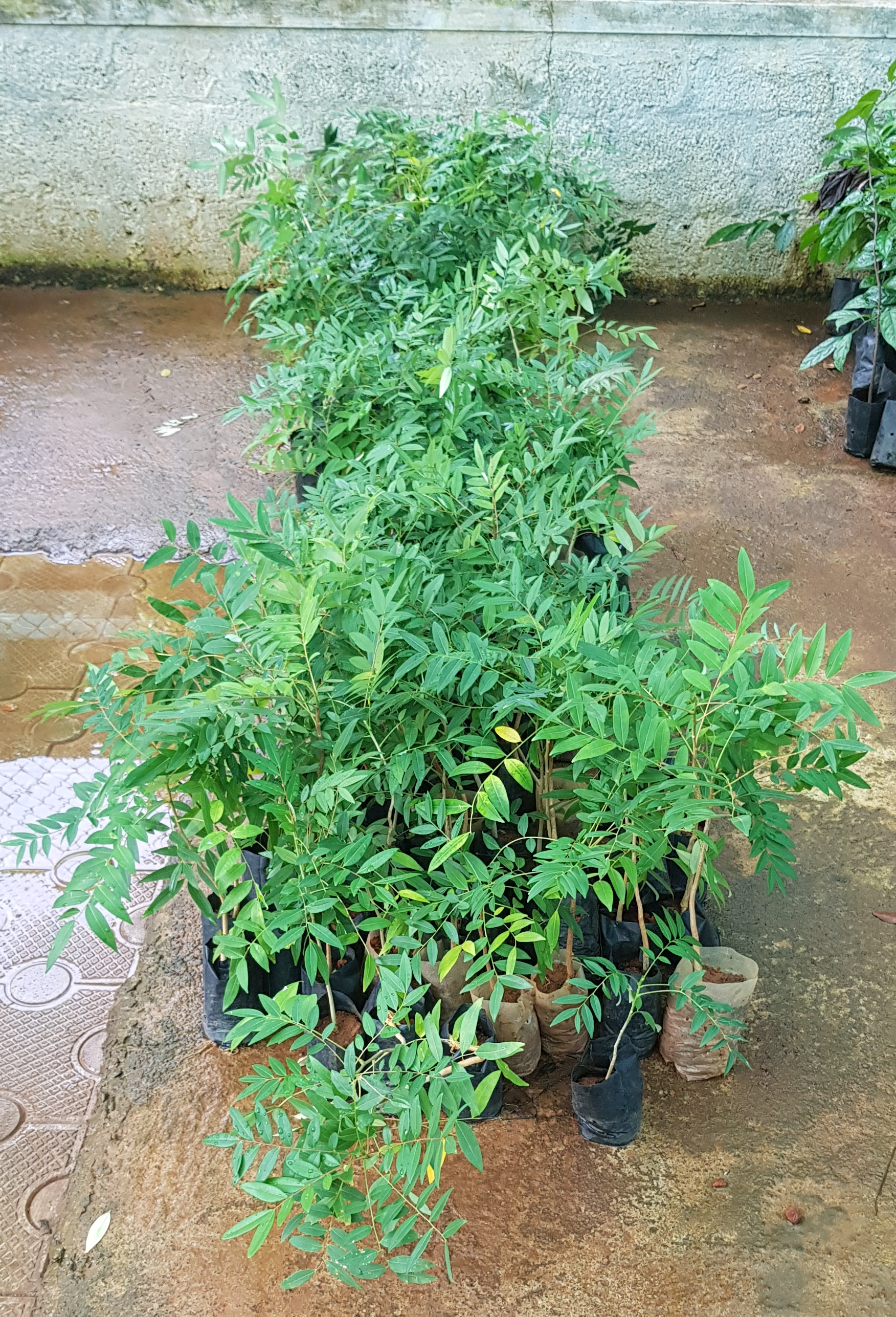
Saplings

Nutrient concentrations in the leaves of seedlings
Nutrient	Concentration (mg/g leaf) (dry weight)
Nitrogen	20
Phosphorus	1
Potassium	16
Calcium	2
Magnesium	5

Experiments on BCI where trenches were dug around seedlings of S. amara, or where gaps in the canopy were made above them, show that their relative growth rate can be increased by both. This shows that their growth is normally limited by both above-ground competition for light and by below-ground competition for nutrients and water. Competition for light is normally more important, as shown by the growth rate increasing by almost 7 times and mortality decreasing, when seedlings were placed in gaps, compared to the understory. When seedlings in gaps had a trench dug round them to prevent below-ground competition their growth increased further, by 50%, demonstrating that in gaps the seedlings are limited by below-ground competition. Trenching around seedlings in the understory did not significantly increase their growth, showing that they are normally only limited by competition for light.

Larger seedlings are more likely to survive the dry season on BCI than smaller seedlings. Density-dependent inhibition occurs between seedlings: they are more likely to survive in areas where fewer seedlings of S. amara are growing. A study on individuals on BCI found that this pattern may be caused by differences in soil biota rather than by insect herbivores or fungal pathogens. Observations based on the distance of seedlings from their parents indicate that the Janzen–Connell hypothesis applies to seedlings of S. amara: they are more likely to survive away from their parents as they escape pests such as herbivores and plant pathogens which are more common underneath the parent trees.

=== Sapling physiology ===
Saplings of S. amara are light demanding and are found in brighter areas of the rainforest compared to Pitheullobium elegans and Lecythis ampla seedlings. A study at the La Selva Biological Station found the leaves weigh approximately 30 g/m^{2} (dry weight), similar to P. elegans, but around double the weight of L. ampla. The photosynthetic capacity of the leaves of S. amara is higher than that of the other two species, averaging around 6 μmol m^{−1} s^{−1}. Dark respiration is on average 0.72 μmol m^{−1} s^{−1}, higher than that of the other two species. The maximum photosynthetic rate correlates with both stem diameter and vertical growth. Diffuse light is thought to be more important for seedling growth than sunflecks. Another study of saplings at La Selva found that they grew 7 cm yr^{−1} in height and 0.25 mm yr^{−1} in diameter. On average they had nine compound leaves, a leaf area index of 0.54 and the total surface area of their leaves was 124 cm^{2}. The saplings that had the lowest leaf area were most likely to die during the study and those with a larger leaf area grew faster than other saplings.

A study of saplings between one and four centimeters in diameter on BCI found that the growth of saplings did not vary depending on which species grew near them, contrary to predictions that density-dependence inhibition occurs. A model based on these findings predicted that saplings with a diameter of 2 cm are able to grow at a maximum rate of 13 mm yr^{−1} and that if another tree with a diameter of 10 cm is growing within 5 m of the sapling, its growth is only reduced to 12 mm yr^{−1}, indicating that they are not affected by crowding. Trees growing more than 15 m away from a sapling do not affect their growth.

== Ecology ==
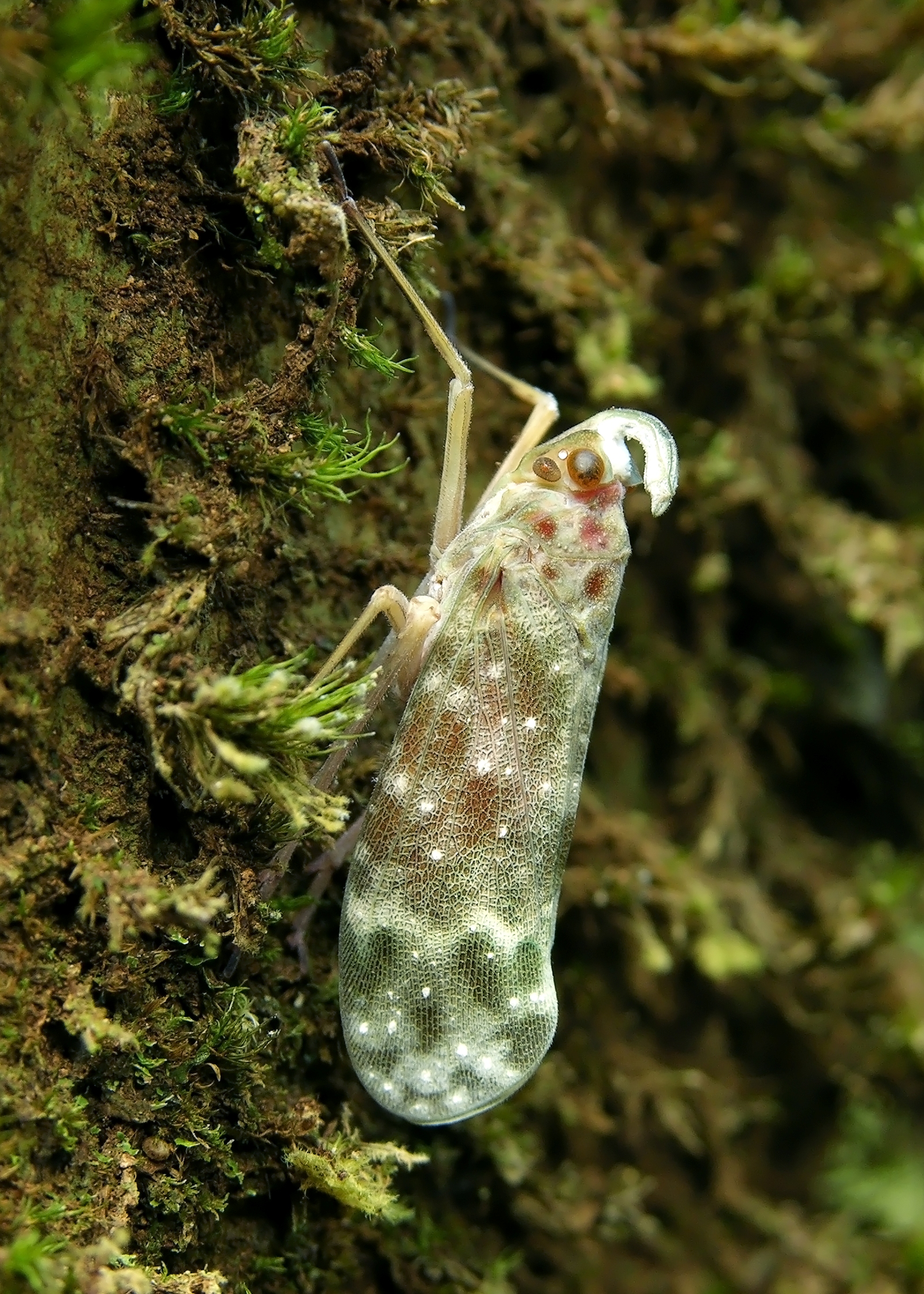
The lantern bug, Enchophora sanguinea, is found preferentially on the trunks of S. amara.

Lianas are relatively rare on mature (>20 cm dbh) individuals of S. amara, compared to other trees on BCI, with only around 25% having lianas growing on them. Putz suggested that this may be due to the trees having large leaves, but the mechanism by which this would reduce the number of lianas is unknown. Smaller individuals also have fewer lianas and woody hemi-epiphytes than other species of tree in the same forests.

The ailanthus webworm (Atteva aurea) and other members of the genus Atteva have been recorded to eat the new shoot tips of S. amara in Costa Rica. The larvae of the butterfly species, Bungalotis diophorus feed exclusively on saplings and treelets of S. amara. Two termite species have been observed living on S. amara in Panama, Calcaritermes brevicollis in dead wood and Microcerotermes arboreus nesting in a gallery on a branch. Bullet ants (Paraponera clavata) have been found to nest at the base of S. amara trees. The Hemiptera, Enchophora sanguinea (Fulgoridae) has been found preferentially on the trunks of S. amara.

== Uses ==
=== Materials ===
Simarouba amara is used locally for producing paper, furniture, plywood and matches and is also used in construction. It is also grown in plantations, as its bright and lightweight timber is highly sought after in European markets for use in making fine furniture and veneers. The wood dries rapidly and is easy to work with normal tools. It is creamy white to light yellow in colour, with a coarse texture and a straight grain. It has to be treated to prevent fungi, wood borers and termites from eating it. The heartwood has a density of 0.35–0.45 g/cm^{3}. It has been noted to be one of the best species for timber that can be grown in the Peruvian Amazon, along with Cedrelinga catenaeformis, due to its rapid growth characteristics. The Worldwide Fund for Nature recommend that consumers ensure S. amara timber is certified by the Forest Stewardship Council so that they do not contribute to deforestation. Wood shavings of S. amara have been used in animal bedding leading to the poisoning of horses and dogs.

=== Herbal medicine ===
According to the Oxford University Virtual Field Herbarium, the leaves and bark of S. amara have been used as an herbal medicine to treat dysentery, diarrhea, malaria and other illnesses in areas where it grows. WebMD say that there is "no good scientific evidence to support its use". In 1713, it was exported to France where it was used to treat dysentery, being an effective treatment during epidemics between 1718 and 1725.

The main biologically active compounds found in S. amara are the quassinoids, a group of triterpenes including ailanthinone, glaucarubinone, and holacanthone. These have been reported to kill protozoa, amoeba, Plasmodium (the cause of malaria). The antimalarial properties were first investigated by scientists in 1947; they found that in chickens, 1 mg of bark extract per 1 kg of body weight had strong antimalarial activity.
