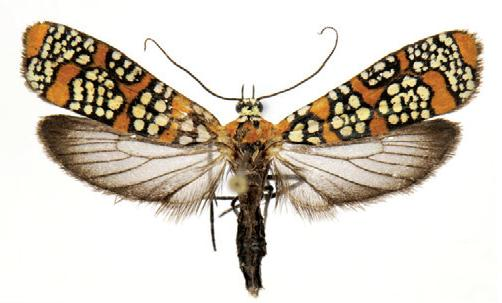
- Atteva aurea

Scientific classification
- Kingdom: Animalia
- Phylum: Arthropoda
- Class: Insecta
- Order: Lepidoptera
- Infraorder: Heteroneura
- Clade: Eulepidoptera
- Clade: Ditrysia
- Superfamily: Yponomeutoidea
- Family: Attevidae
- Genus: Atteva; Walker, 1854

Species
- See text

= Atteva =

Family of moths

Atteva is a genus of moths in the monotypic family Attevidae. The group has a pantropical distribution; however, the range of at least one species, Atteva aurea, extends into the temperate zone. No consistent hypotheses regarding the relationships, placement, and ranking of Attevidae have been published, but the prevalent view is that they likely form a monophyletic group within the Yponomeutoidea.

== Species ==
- Atteva albiguttata - Zeller, 1873 (from Australia)
- Atteva albitarsis - Zeller, 1875 (Australian region)
- Atteva aleatrix - Meyrick, 1922 (from Fiji)
- Atteva anisochrysa - Meyrick, 1928 (from New Britain)
- Atteva apicalis - Snellen van Vollenhoven, 1863 (from Java, Philippines)
- Atteva aurata - Butler, 1882 (Duke of York Islands/ Papua New Guinea)
- Atteva aurea - (Fitch, 1856) (neotropics)
- Atteva balanota - Meyrick, 1910 (from the Philippines)
- Atteva basalis - Snellen van Vollenhoven, 1863 (from the Moluccas)
- Atteva charopis - Turner, 1903 (from Australia)
- Atteva chionosticta - Durrant, 1916 (from Dutch New Guinea)
- Atteva conspicua - Walsingham, 1900 (from Moluccas/Papua New Guinea)
- Atteva cosmogona - Meyrick, 1931 (from Brazil)
- Atteva cuprina - Felder, 1875 (from Moluccas/Celebes)
- Atteva emissella - Walker, 1863 (from Sarawak/Borneo)
- Atteva fabricella - Wallengren, 1861 from India/Borneo)
- Atteva fabriciella - Swederus, 1787
- Atteva flavivitta - Walker, 1866 (from Colombia)
- Atteva floridana - (Neumoegen) (from Florida)
- Atteva fulviguttata - Zeller, 1873 (from the Antilles)
- Atteva gemmata - Grote, 1873 (from Cuba)
- Atteva heliodoxa - Meyrick, 1910
- Atteva hesychina - Turner, 1923 (from Australia)
- Atteva holenopla - Diakonoff, 1967 (from Luzon, Philippines)
- Atteva hysginiella - Wallengren, 1861 (from Galapagos)
- Atteva impariguttata - Zeller, 1877 (from Sri Lanka)
- Atteva impunctella - Ritsema, 1875 (from Ternate/Moluccas)
- Atteva intermedia - Becker, 2009 (from Antigua)
- Atteva iris - Felder, 1875 (from Moluccas)
- Atteva mathewi - Butler, 1887 (from New Hebrides)
- Atteva megalastra - Meyrick, 1907 (from Australia)
- Atteva modesta - Snellen, 1901
- Atteva monerythra - Meyrick, 1926 (from Galapagos)
- Atteva monoplanetis - Meyrick, 1910 (from Bismarck archipelago)
- Atteva niphocosma - Turner, 1903 (from Australia)
- Atteva niveigutta - Walker, 1854 (Sylhet, Bangladesh)
- Atteva numeratrix - Meyrick, 1930 (from Brazil)
- Atteva pastulella - Fabricius, 1787
- Atteva porphyris - Meyrick, 1907 (from the Salomon islands)
- Atteva pulchella - Moore, 1888
- Atteva pustulella - Fabricius, 1794 (neotropics)
- Atteva pyrothorax - Meyrick, 1928
- Atteva rawlinsi - Becker, 2009 (from the Dominican Republic)
- Atteva rex - Butler, 1887 (from Salomon islands)
- Atteva sciodoxa - Meyrick, 1908 (from Burma/Borneo)
- Atteva scolecias - Meyrick, 1928 (from the Philippines)
- Atteva siderea - Walsingham, 1891 (from the Dominican Republic)
- Atteva sidereoides - Becker, 2009 (from Jamaica)
- Atteva sphaerodoxa - Meyrick, 1918 (from New Guinea)
- Atteva sphaerotrocha - Meyrick, 1936 (from New Caledonia)
- Atteva subaurata - Durrant, 1900 (from Sikkim and Assam)
- Atteva teratias - Meyrick, 1907 (Woodlark Isl./Papua New Guinea)
- Atteva triplex - Diakonoff, 1967 (from the Philippines)
- Atteva wallengreni - Sohn & Wu, 2013 (from China, Thailand, Vietnam)
- Atteva yanguifella - Sohn & Wu, 2013 (from China)
- Atteva zebra - Duckworth, 1967 (from Panama)
- Atteva zebrina - Becker, 2009 (from Brazil)

== Former species ==
- Atteva brucea - Moore, 1859 (synonym of Atteva fabriciella)
- Atteva carteri - Walsingham, 1891 (from Gambia - synonym of Syncallia stellata Guérin-Méneville, 1844
- Atteva niviguttella - Walker, 1863 (synonym of Atteva fabriciella)
