= Atteva gemmata =

Scientific classification
- Kingdom: Animalia
- Phylum: Arthropoda
- Class: Insecta
- Order: Lepidoptera
- Family: Attevidae
- Genus: Atteva
- Species: A. gemmata

Binomial name
- Atteva gemmata (Grote, 1873)

Synonyms
- Oeta gemmata Grote, 1873; Oeta fastuosa Zeller, 1877

Species of moth

Atteva gemmata is a moth of the family Attevidae. It was described by Augustus Radcliffe Grote in 1873 and is endemic to Cuba.
