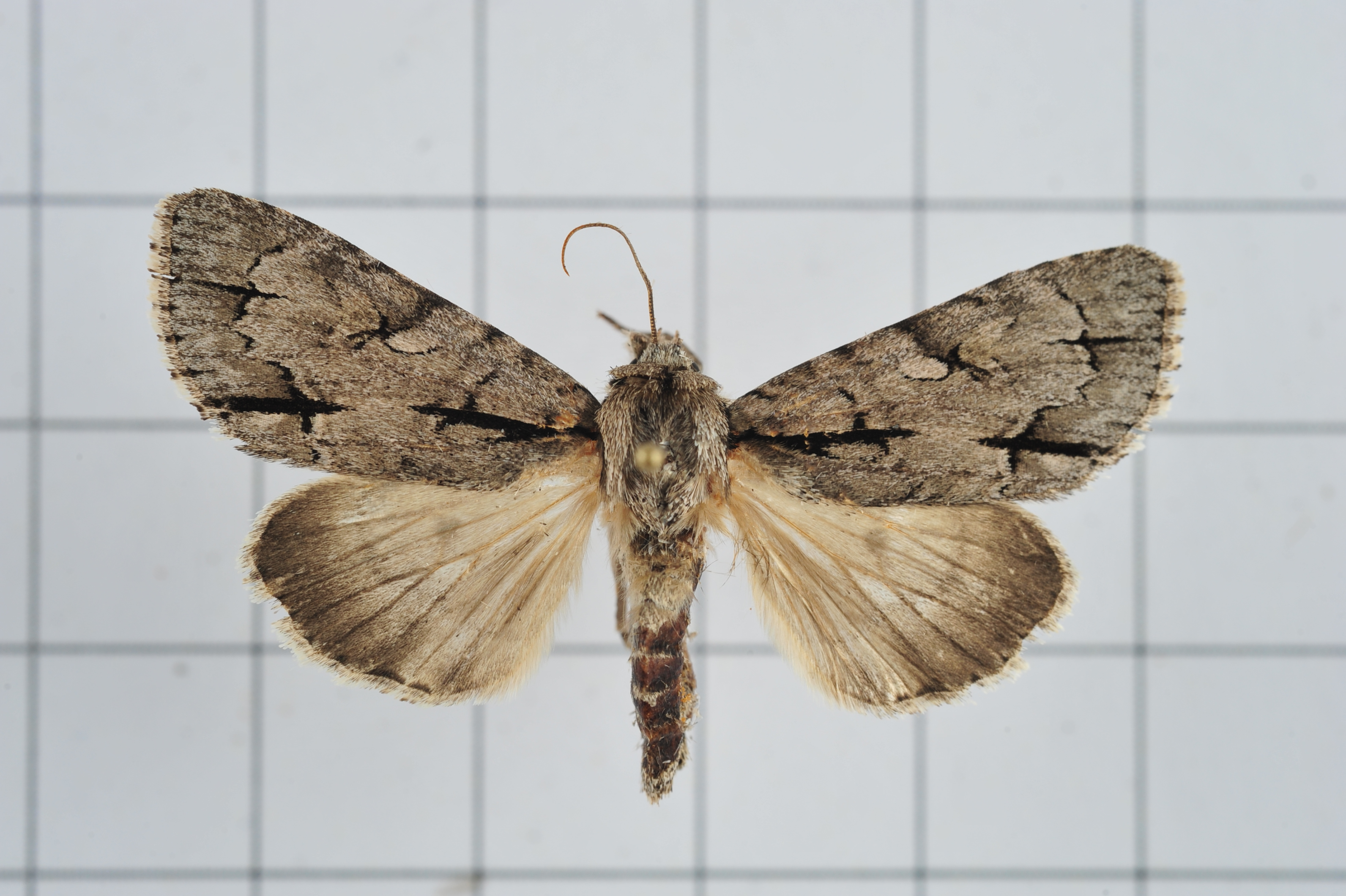

Scientific classification
- Kingdom: Animalia
- Phylum: Arthropoda
- Clade: Pancrustacea
- Class: Insecta
- Order: Lepidoptera
- Superfamily: Noctuoidea
- Family: Noctuidae
- Genus: Acronicta
- Species: A. intermedia

Binomial name
- Acronicta intermedia (Warren, 1909)

Synonyms
- Acronycta intermedia Warren, 1909; Acronycta increta Butler, 1909; Acronycta incretata Hampson, 1909; Acronycta jazoensis Matsumura, 1909; Acronycta formosana Matsumura, 1909

= Acronicta intermedia =

Species of moth

Acronicta intermedia is a moth of the family Noctuidae. It is found in the Korean Peninsula, the Russian Far East, Japan, and Taiwan.
