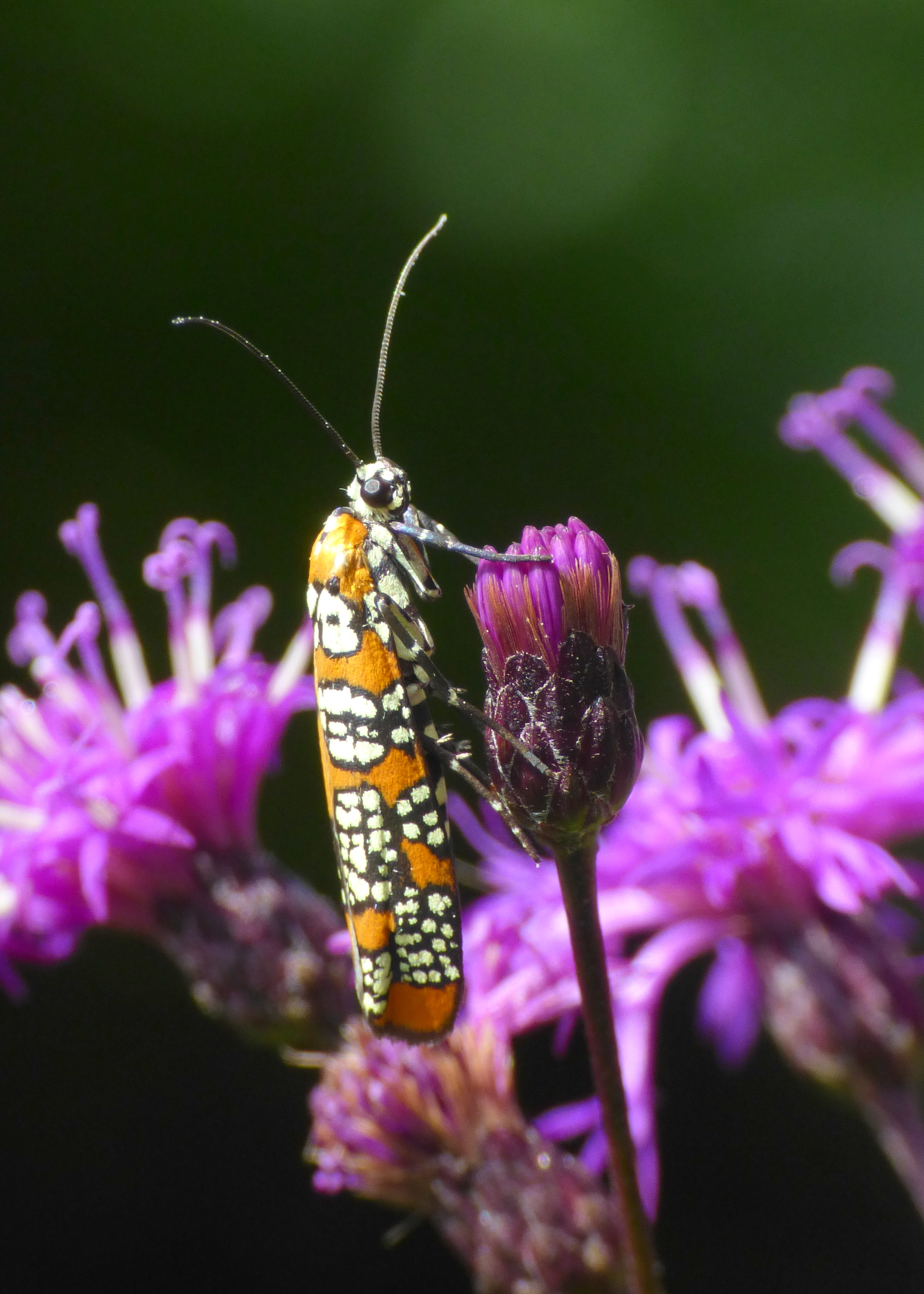
- Atteva aurea feeding on Vernonia gigantea

Scientific classification
- Kingdom: Animalia
- Phylum: Arthropoda
- Clade: Pancrustacea
- Class: Insecta
- Order: Lepidoptera
- Family: Attevidae
- Genus: Atteva
- Species: A. aurea

Binomial name
- Atteva aurea (Fitch, 1856)

Synonyms
- Deiopeia aurea Fitch, 1857; Poeciloptera compta Clemens, 1861; Oeta aurera Stretch, 1873 (misspelling); Oeta compta var. floridana Neumoegen, 1891; Atteva edithella Busck, 1908; Atteva exquisita Busck, 1912; Atteva ergatica Walsingham, 1914; Atteva microsticta Walsingham, 1914

= Ailanthus webworm =

Species of insect

The Ailanthus webworm (Atteva aurea) is an ermine moth found commonly in the United States. This small, colorful moth resembles a true bug or beetle when not in flight, but when in flight it resembles a wasp. Its original range included the American tropics since its host tree (paradise tree) is found in this geographic range. It has expanded its range North as it has adapted to live and feed on Ailanthus altissima.

== Identification ==
Ailanthus webworm moth adults have several notable characteristics. Their forewings are bright orange with white spots surrounded in black. On their heads they have labial palps that curve upward and front facing antennae.

== Host plants ==
The ailanthus webworm is hypothesized to be native to South Florida and the American tropics (as far South as Costa Rica), which contains their original larval host plants: paradise tree (Simarouba glauca) and Simarouba amara. Although these two trees were the webworms original host plants, it has since expanded its range to include another host plant Ailanthus altissima.

The tree-of-heaven (Ailanthus altissima), originally from China, has expanded across the United States, and is widely considered an invasive species. Tree-of-heaven is the host plant of several invasive species such as the spotted lanternfly and A. aurea is thought to have adapted to feed on and breed in it as well. This hypothesis comes from the fact that A. altissima is in the same family of its original host plant (Simaroubaceae). This resulted in the expansion further North in the United States. This expansion of its range to nest in Ailanthus altissima is what resulted in its common name the Ailanthus webworm moth.

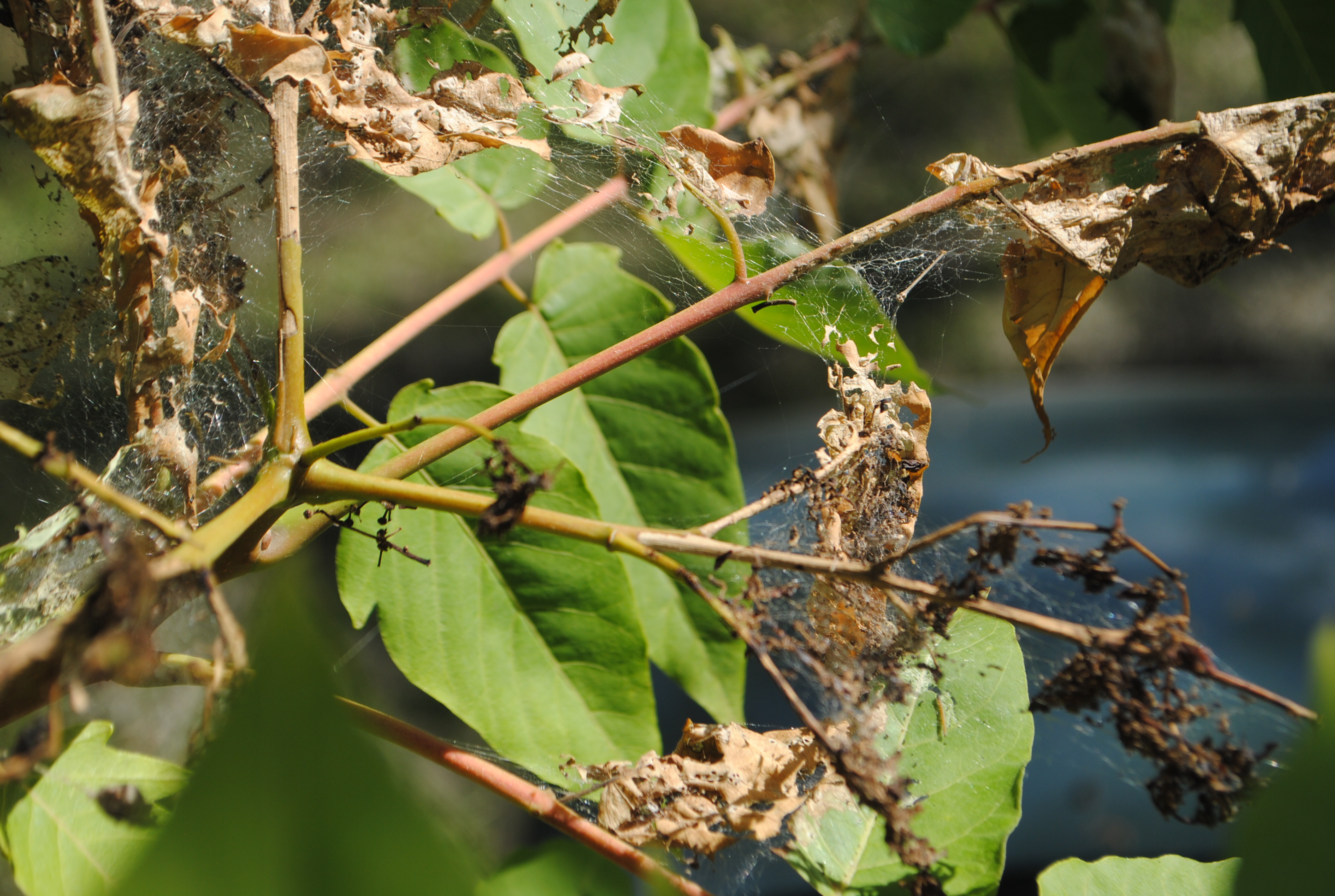
Ailanthus webworm in Ailanthus altissima tree

== Climate ==
Originally found in the Southern U.S., the moth is commonly seen in summer throughout the continental US (although it has not reached the most Western states), and occasionally eastern Canada. This species appears to be either adapting to colder areas, or staying further north due to changing climates.

== Life cycle ==
Larvae (caterpillars) build nests on the host plant by pulling the leaves together around a network of webbing. They will then live there and consume the leaves of the host plant. Eggs are found individually, not in clusters, even though each web may contain many separate eggs. The caterpillars have a wide, light greenish-brown stripe down their backs and several thin, alternating white and olive-green stripes along their sides. The range of colors is from light brown to dark black. The adult moth visits flowers, is diurnal, and is a pollinator. The life cycle from egg to pupa can happen in four weeks. This can result in a communal web that has multiple generations and insects from all life stages. This is a result of the moths being gregarious, meaning that they live in communities.

== Taxonomy ==
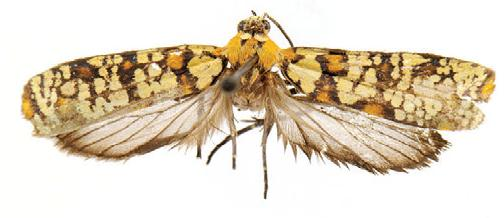
Atteva edithella, now considered a synonym of Atteva aurea

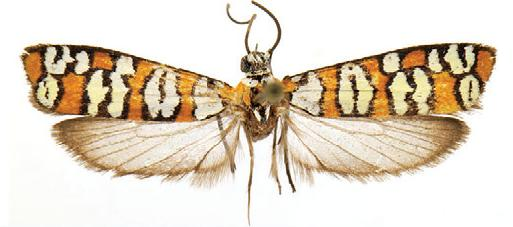
Atteva exquisita, now considered a synonym of Atteva aurea

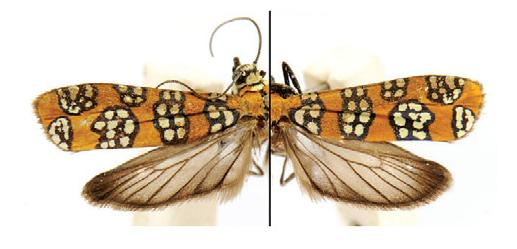
Atteva ergatica, now considered a synonym of Atteva aurea

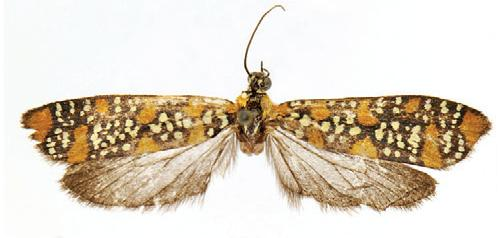
Atteva microsticta, now considered a synonym of Atteva aurea

Wilson et al. (2010) discovered that morphologically similar Attevid moths were assigned two different names, Atteva ergatica in Costa Rica and Atteva punctella in North America, but had identical DNA barcodes.
