= List of moths of Australia (Yponomeutidae) =

Partial list of Australian moths

This is a list of the Australian moth species of the family Yponomeutidae. It also acts as an index to the species articles and forms part of the full List of moths of Australia.

== Attevinae ==
- Atteva albiguttata (Zeller, 1873)
- Atteva charopis Turner, 1903
- Atteva megalastra Meyrick, 1907
- Atteva niphocosma Turner, 1903

== Praydinae ==
- Prays amblystola Turner, 1923
- Prays autocasis Meyrick, 1907
- Prays calycias Meyrick, 1907
- Prays inscripta Meyrick, 1907
- Prays nephelomima Meyrick, 1907
- Prays parilis Turner, 1923
- Prays tyrastis Meyrick, 1907

The following species belongs to the subfamily Praydinae, but has not been assigned to a genus yet. Given here is the original name given to the species when it was first described:

- Eriocottis euryphracta Meyrick, 1893

== Yponomeutinae ==
- Anoista insolita Turner, 1939
- Charicrita citrozona Meyrick, 1913
- Charicrita orthonina Turner, 1927
- Charicrita sericoleuca Turner, 1923
- Chionogenes drosochlora (Meyrick, 1907)
- Chionogenes isanema (Meyrick, 1907)
- Chionogenes trimetra Meyrick, 1913
- Lissochroa argostola Turner, 1923
- Litaneutis sacrifica Meyrick, 1913
- Niphonympha oxydelta (Meyrick, 1913)
- Nymphonia zaleuca Meyrick, 1913
- Opsiclines leucomorpha (Lower, 1900)
- Orsocoma macrogona Meyrick, 1921
- Palleura nitida Turner, 1926
- Spaniophylla epiclithra Turner, 1917
- Teinoptila interruptella Sauber, 1902
- Xyrosaris acroxutha Turner, 1923
- Xyrosaris dryopa Meyrick, 1907
- Yponomeuta internellus (Walker, 1863)
- Yponomeuta liberalis (Meyrick, 1913)
- Yponomeuta myriosema (Turner, 1898)
- Yponomeuta paurodes Meyrick, 1907
- Yponomeuta pustulellus (Walker, 1863)
- Zelleria aphrospora Meyrick, 1893
- Zelleria araeodes Meyrick, 1893
- Zelleria callidoxa Meyrick, 1893
- Zelleria citrina Meyrick, 1893
- Zelleria cremnospila Lower, 1900
- Zelleria cryptica Meyrick, 1913
- Zelleria cyanoleuca (Lower, 1908)
- Zelleria cynetica Meyrick, 1893
- Zelleria euthysema Turner, 1923
- Zelleria hemixipha Lower, 1900
- Zelleria isopyrrha Meyrick, 1921
- Zelleria malacodes Turner, 1939
- Zelleria memorella Meyrick, 1893
- Zelleria mystarcha Meyrick, 1893
- Zelleria orthopleura Turner, 1923
- Zelleria panceuthes Turner, 1923
- Zelleria proterospila Meyrick, 1893
- Zelleria pyroleuca Meyrick, 1893
- Zelleria sigillata Meyrick, 1893
- Zelleria stylograpta Meyrick, 1907

The following species belongs to the subfamily Yponomeutinae, but has not been assigned to a genus yet. Given here is the original name given to the species when it was first described:

- Amblyzancla araeoptila Turner, 1939
