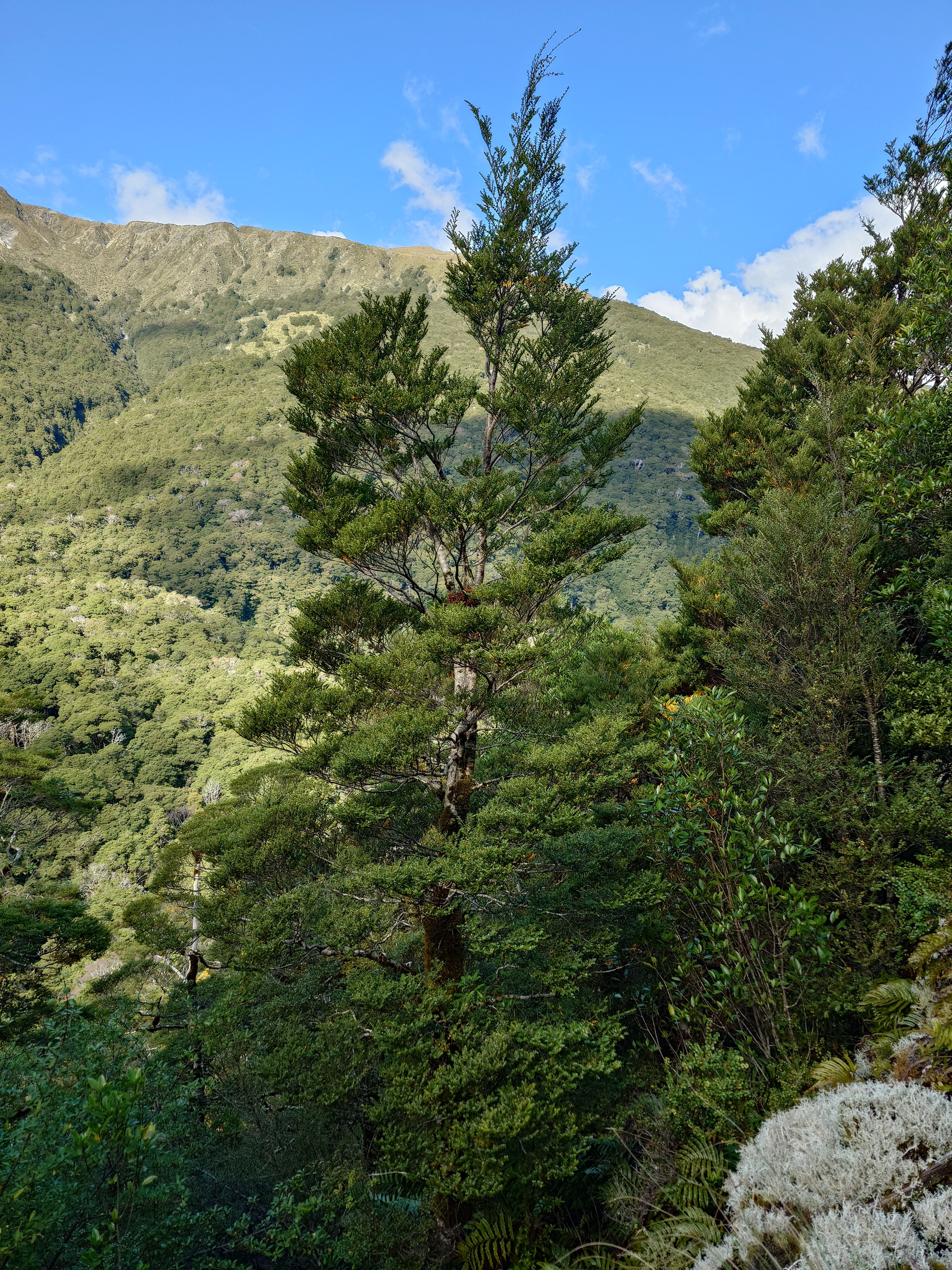
- A mature N. menziesii specimen in the South Island's West Coast Region

Conservation status
- Least Concern (IUCN 3.1)

Scientific classification
- Kingdom: Plantae
- Clade: Embryophytes
- Clade: Tracheophytes
- Clade: Spermatophytes
- Clade: Angiosperms
- Clade: Eudicots
- Clade: Rosids
- Order: Fagales
- Family: Nothofagaceae
- Genus: Nothofagus
- Subgenus: Nothofagus subg. Lophozonia
- Species: N. menziesii

Binomial name
- Nothofagus menziesii (Hook.f.)

Synonyms
- Lophozonia menziesii Fagus menziesii

= Nothofagus menziesii =

Species of evergreen tree

Nothofagus menziesii, commonly known as silver beech, is a species of evergreen tree in the family Nothofagaceae. It is endemic to New Zealand and is widespread in the North and South Islands. It reaches a height of up to 30 metres (100 feet) tall, with a trunk of up to 1–2 m (3 ft 3 in – 6 ft 7 in) in diameter. N. menziesii has an estimated lifespan of 600 years.

Nothofagus menziesii was first described in 1871 by the British botanist Joseph Dalton Hooker, who named the species in honour of the Scottish naturalist Archibald Menzies. N. menziesii is categorised in the subgenus Lophozonia within the genus Nothofagus. The origin of the Nothofagus genus can be traced to the ancient supercontinent of Gondwana, where it likely emerged around 80–90 million years ago during the Late Cretaceous epoch in the Antarctic Peninsula. N. menziesii's inflorescences (flower clusters) are found in groups of 1–4 per branchlet, with short, slightly hairy stalks that support a single terminal flower. The perianth (floral structure) is 5–6 mm in diameter, consisting of two uneven parts, each split into 2–3 segments. It has 30–36 pollen-producing stamens with tiny anthers on the top. Its bark is smooth and is a silvery-greyish colour on young trees, with horizontal lenticels, gradually becoming more furrowed on the tree as it matures.

Kākā (Nestor meridionalis) occasionally visit the tree, to search for the larvae of pūriri moth (Aenetus virescens) deeply scarring the tree in the process. Across New Zealand, deer browse seedlings, young specimens, and consume the foliage, often leading to the death of seedlings. New Zealand's Nothofagus species are considered taonga (treasured) by Māori and the timber from the tree was an important resource that was crafted into fishing hooks. N. menziesii's conservation status was assessed by the IUCN Red List in 2017 as "Least Concern", and its population trend was assessed as "Stable".

== Description ==
Nothofagus menziesii (silver beech) is an evergreen tree in the family Nothofagaceae. It reaches a height of up to 30 metres (100 feet) tall, with a trunk measuring up to 1–2 m (3 ft 3 in – 6 ft 7 in) in diameter. In subalpine forests, N. menziesii typically grows to a height of 12 m (39 ft) with a diameter of 80 cm (31 in). The trunks are generally straight or slightly curved, with narrow crowns. However, when it grows in open areas, individuals tend to develop extensive branching closer to the ground, resulting in broad, spreading crowns. Its bark is smooth and is a silvery-greyish colour on young trees, with horizontal lenticels, gradually becoming more furrowed on trees as it matures. N. menziesii has an estimated lifespan of 600 years.

Its leaves are thick and rigid, green in colour, coriaceous (leather-like) in character, measuring 6–15 mm long × 5–15 mm wide, with petioles that are 2–3 mm long. Its lamina (leaf blades) are glabrous (smooth) except for the veins on the underside, broadly triangular to nearly circular in shape, with double-toothed edges and a wedge-shaped base. Juvenile leaves of N. menziesii are sometimes red in colour. Its cupules are 6–7 mm long, divided into 4 segments, and adorned with 4–5 rows of gland-tipped projections, accompanied by 2 leaf-like bracts. N. menziesii also produces nuts which are puberulous (slightly hairy) in character, 5 mm long; the lateral ones are triquetrous (triangular) in character and are about 5 mm long, pale brown to reddish-brown in colour. Its wings are tipped with glands, and may differ in shape: the lateral ones are dimerous or aborted, triangular and three-winged, while the terminal ones are flat and two-winged, with the wings extending upwards. N. menziesii's nuts also contain a single seed; these seeds weigh about 4–5 mg and are characterised by their narrow wings. Fruiting of N. menziesii occurs from January to March. N. menziesii has a diploid chromosome count of 26.

Flowering occurs from November to January. In staminate specimens, the inflorescences (flower clusters) are arranged in clusters of 1–4 per branchlet, with sparsely hairy stalks that are 2–3 mm long and support a single terminal flower. The perianth (floral structure) is 5–6 mm in diameter, consisting of 2 uneven lobes, each further divided into 2–3 segments. There are 30–36 stamens with anthers (pollen-containing parts) measuring 2–3 mm, which are red on top and greenish or straw-coloured below. In pistillate specimens, inflorescences occur 1–4 times per branchlet, with 2–3 flowers on short, densely hairy stalks. The lateral flowers are arranged in groups of three, while terminal flowers appear in pairs or are left undeveloped; the stigma are elongated and are strap-shaped.

=== Phytochemistry ===
At least forty-two flavonoids and a stilbene (pinosylvin) have been described from various Nothofagus species from a scientific study published in 2003. N. menziesii has twelve known compounds and has an "almost identical" flavonoid profile with N. alpina (recorded in the study as N. nervosa). The flavonoids associated with N. menziesii include: 8-OH-Gal-8-Me, several herbacetin and kaempferol flavonoids, Qu-3,30-Me, and several apigenin flavonoids.

== Gallery ==
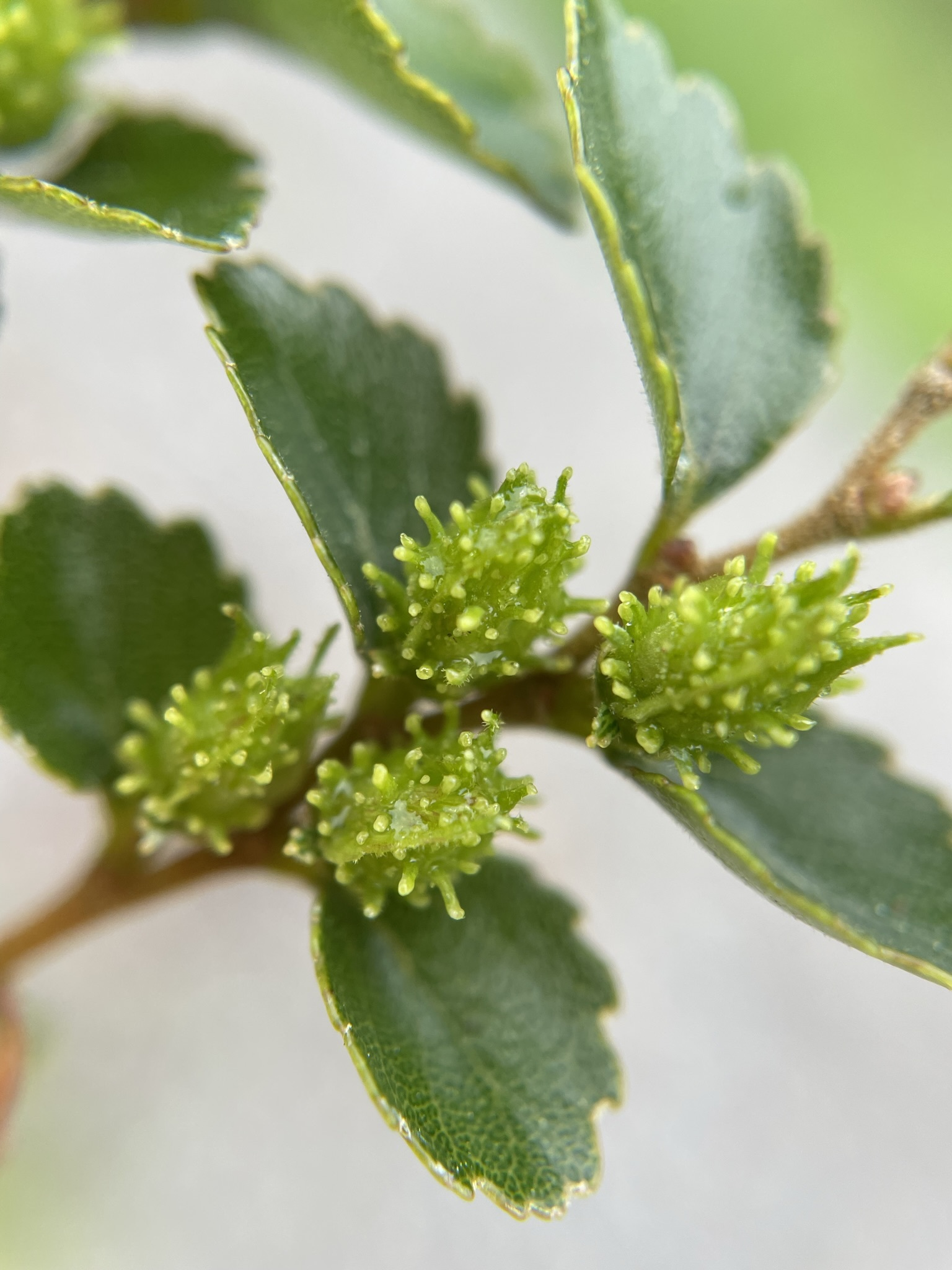
A cluster of developing nuts and cupule valves with rows of stalked appendages with globular glands

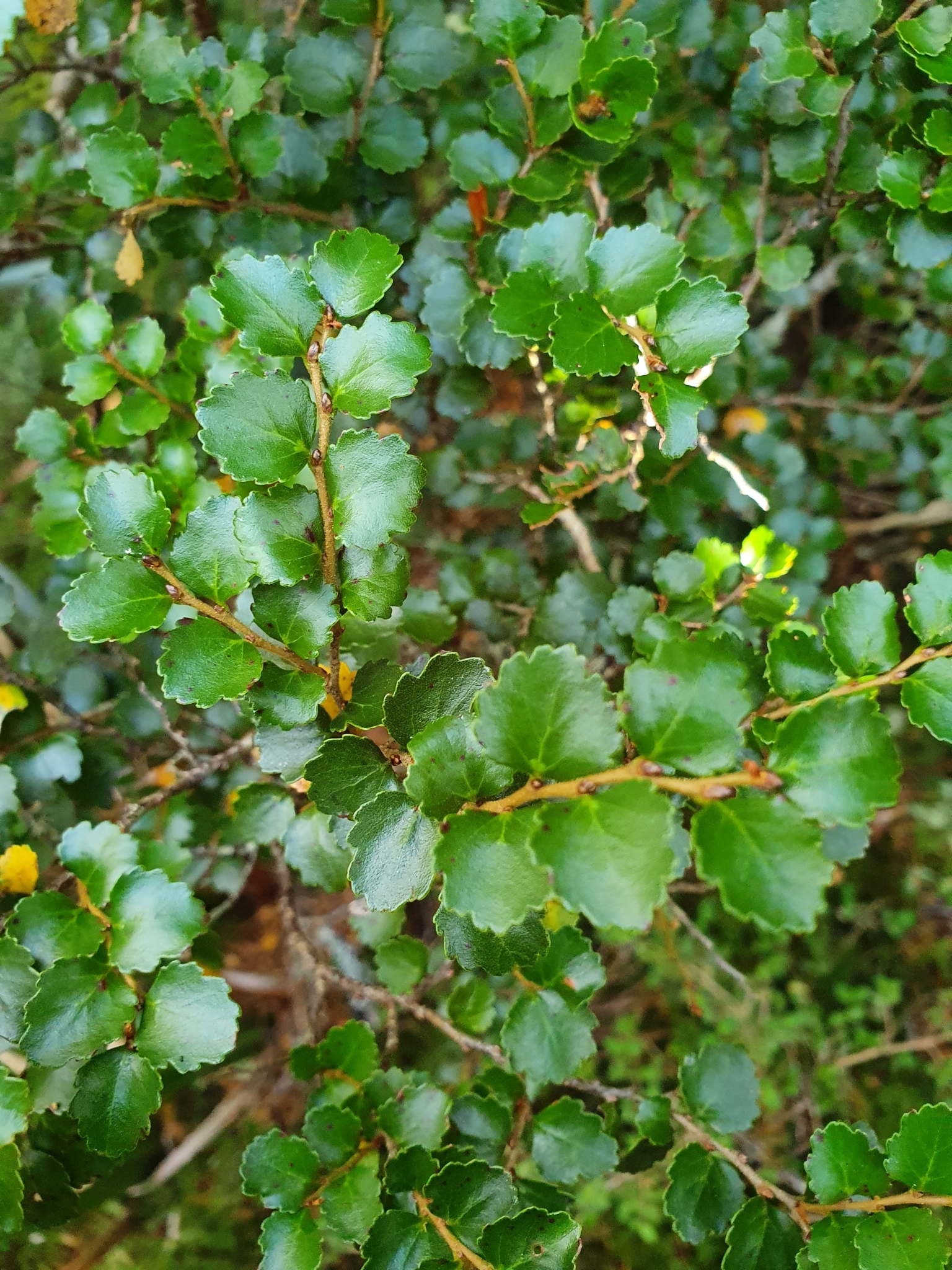
Foliage of an individual; its leaves are thick, leathery, and rigid, with short petioles about 2–3 mm long.

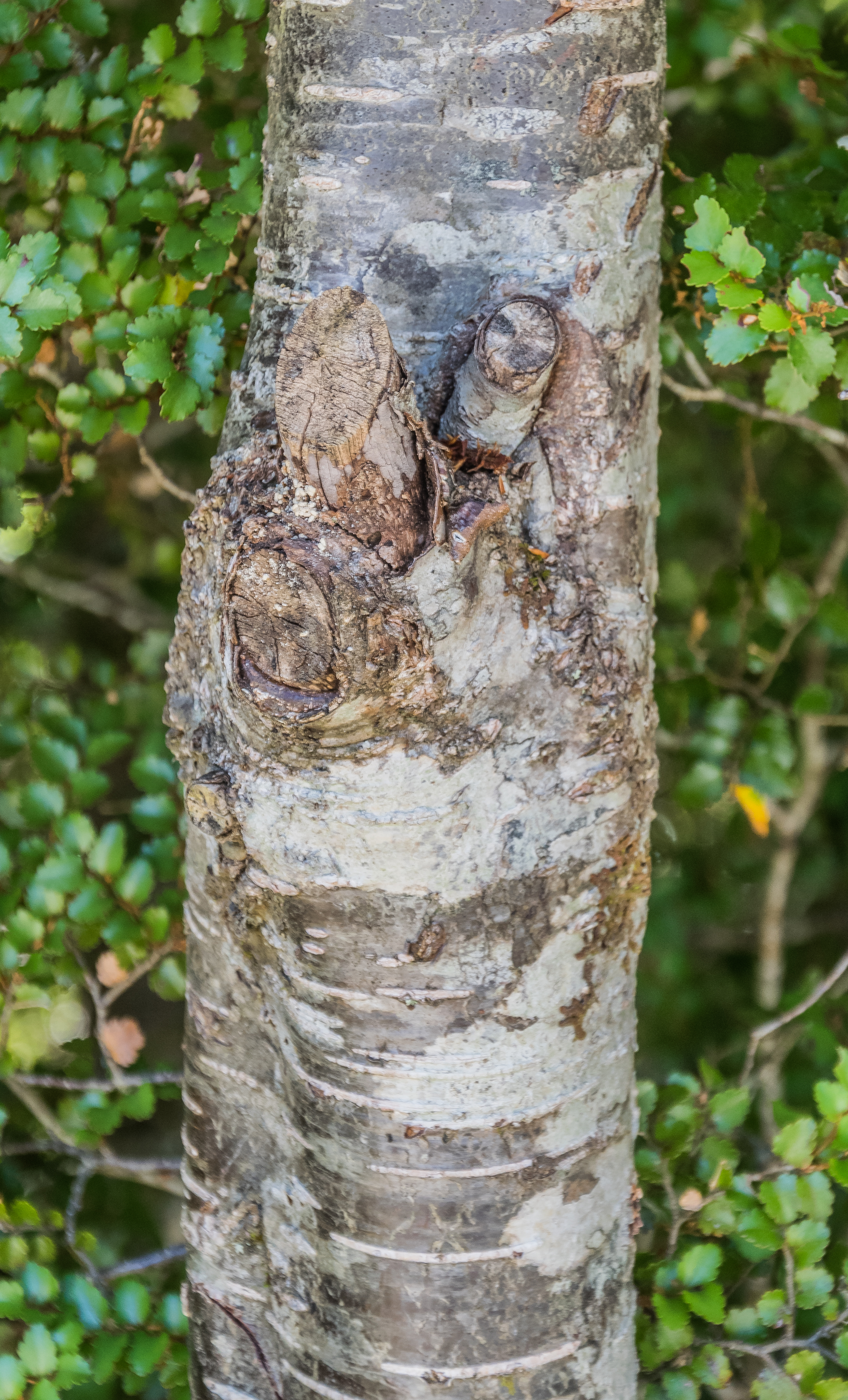
Silvery bark of an individual; its bark is smooth with horizontal lenticels.

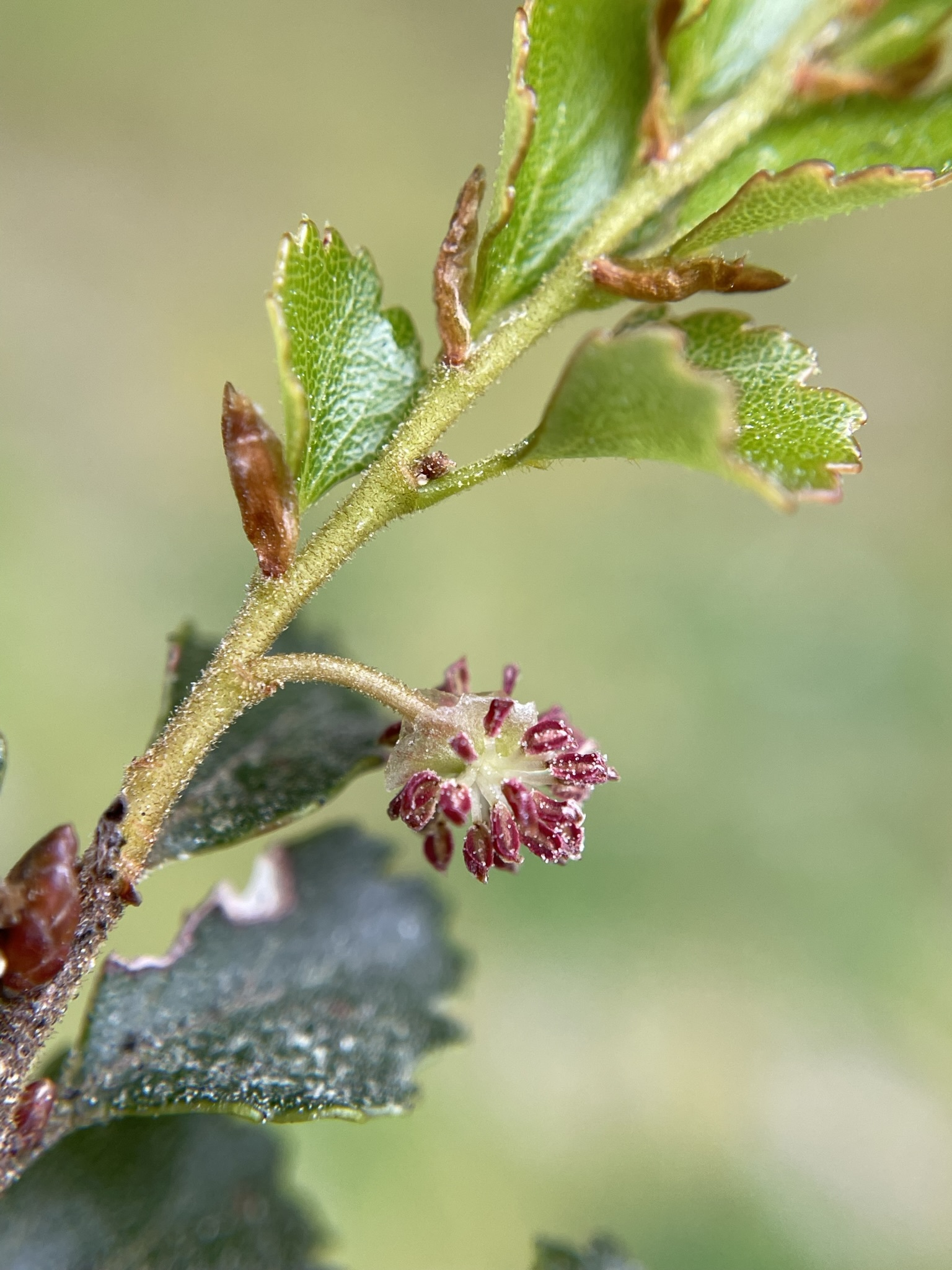
An inflorescence; its perianth (floral structure) consists of 30–36 stamens with tiny anthers, which are coloured-red on the top.

== Taxonomy ==
=== Classification ===
- - - †N. microphylla
    - - - N. cunninghamii
        - †N. maidenii
      - - - N. moorei
          - †N. tasmanica
        - - N. menziesii
          - †N. pachyphylla
  - - †N. carpinoides
    - - N. alpina
      - N. elongata
    - - †N. glaucifolia
      - - N. multinervis
        - - †N. beardmorensis
          - N. glauca
          - N. obliqua

Cladogram depicting the phylogeny and relationships of species within the subgenus Lophozonia in the genus Nothofagus.

Nothofagus is a genus that consists of thirty-seven deciduous and evergreen trees (and occasionally shrubs), in the family Nothofagaceae. The genus occurs only in the Southern Hemisphere at both temperate and tropical latitudes, with species found naturally in: Australia, South America, New Caledonia, New Guinea, and New Zealand. N. menziesii was first described by the British botanist Joseph Dalton Hooker in 1871. N. menziesii is not closely related to the other New Zealand Nothofagus species. It is most closely related to the Australian N. moorei and N. cunninghamii species.

In 2013, two researchers proposed renaming N. menziesii to Lophozonia menziesii in an article published by Phytotaxa. This is because they argued that the morphological and molecular differences of the groups within the family could be recognised as separate genera. However, a 2015 revision of the genus declined the proposal, arguing that since fossil taxa dominate the Nothofagaceae family, adopting the classification would cause significant taxonomic complications and reduce the importance of fossil records. The 2013 classification has also not been widely accepted outside of New Zealand.

Nothofagus menziesii is categorised in the subgenus Lophozonia within the genus Nothofagus. N. menziesii is the only New Zealand Nothofagus species to belong to the Lophozonia subgenus, which consists of seven species, spread across Australia and South America. In 2022, an analysis published by Acta Palaeontologica Polonica of the phylogenetic and evolutionary relationships among extant and extinct species of the Nothofagus genus produced a cladogram using extended implied weighting analysis; in which N. menziesii was placed in the clade (group) Lophozonia. The clade is divided into two primary groups based on geographic associations and fossil records. The first group consists of species from Australasia, encompassing one branch with the fossil N. microphylla species and another branch with fossils limited to N. cunninghamii and N. maidenii, the second sub-branch consists of N. tasmanica, N. menziesii and N. pachyphylla. The second group includes species from the Antarctic Peninsula and South America. This clade forms a polytomy, consisting of three branches. This is summarised in the cladogram at the right.

=== Evolution ===
A 2024 analysis of the genus Nothofagus suggested that the genus originated in the Antarctic Peninsula 80–90 million years ago. An ancestral reconstruction indicates that the common ancestor of Nothofagus likely emerged approximately 80–90 million years ago during the Late Cretaceous epoch in the Antarctic Peninsula. The historical distribution of Nothofagus, extending the genus into regions like Australasia and South America, was influenced by dispersal events in the Antarctic Peninsula. A later dispersal of the genus extended it to tropical areas such as New Caledonia and New Guinea, with further diversification events occurring in the Palaeocene epoch (c. 60–65 Ma) and late Eocene to Oligocene epoch (c. 45–30 Ma).

=== Etymology ===
The etymology (word origin) of the species' genus, Nothofagus, is a Latin term for the European beech tree and may originate from the Greek words notho, meaning 'false', and phago, meaning 'to eat', a prefix commonly used in scientific naming conventions. Joseph Dalton Hooker, who first formally described N. menziessii, named the species in honour of the Scottish naturalist, Archibald Menzies, by applying his surname to the specific epithet (second part of the scientific name). N. menziesii is commonly known as the 'silver beech' in English. In the Māori language, the species is known as tawhai rauriki.

== Distribution ==
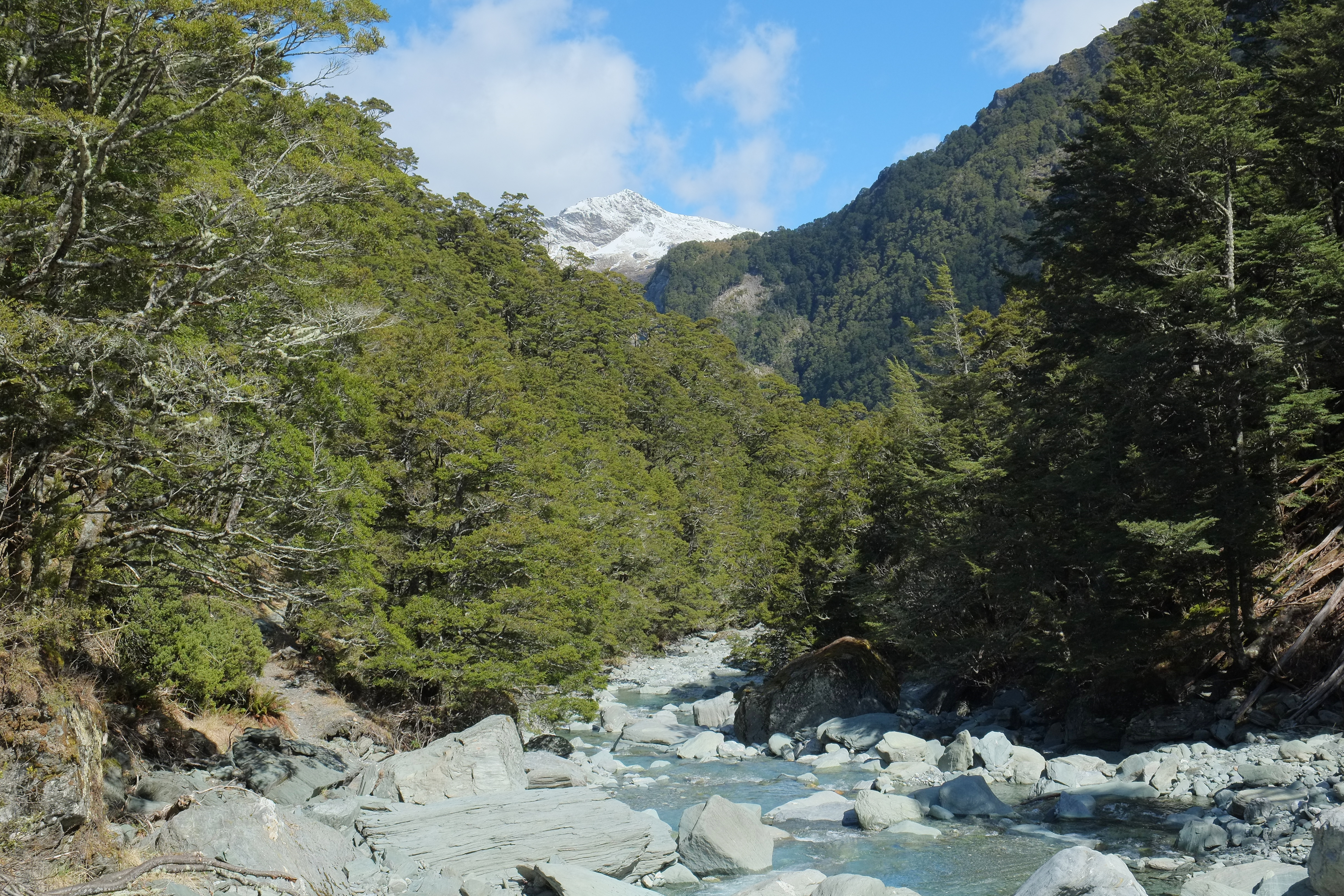
N. menziesii (silver beech) forest in the Rob Roy Valley near Wānaka

N. menziesii is endemic to New Zealand. Its range is widespread, although it is not continuous, throughout the North and South Islands. In the North Island, N. menziesii is abundant in montane and subalpine forests across several mountain ranges, and it is only found southwards of the thirty-seventh latitude. N. menziesii is naturally not present on Mount Taranaki and in the Taranaki Region altogether. N. menziesii also occurs in smaller forest groups on the Ahimanawa Range, Kaimanawa Range, Kaweka Range, Mamaku Plateau, Mount Te Aroha, and the southwestern slopes of Mount Ruapehu.

In the South Island, N. menziesii is abundant northwest from the Marlborough Sounds to the Taramakau River and west of a line through the valleys of Lakes Hāwea, Ōhau, Wakatipu, and Wānaka, to the Longwood Range and Takitimu Mountains. In the Westland Region, isolated stands of N. menziesii exist near Otira and in the upper catchments of rivers such as the Karangarua and Mahitahi, as well as other locations such as near the Poulter River and the Blue Mountains. Stewart Island, located south of the South Island, and separated by the Foveaux Strait, does not have a natural presence of Nothofagus species.

A 2020 study in the New Zealand Journal of Botany of the phylogeography of New Zealand's Nothofagus species, using DNA analysis, revealed the glacial cycles that occurred during the Pleistocene epoch have subsequently affected the present-day distribution of Nothofagus species, separated by "beech gaps". In comparison to other New Zealand Nothofagus species, N. menziesii was described by the researchers to be "relatively genetically diverse", which was defined by the identification of nine identified haplotypes. In their analysis, genetic data from DNA profiling supported a significant phylogeographic insight, which enabled the assessment of various hypotheses regarding the origins and current distribution of N. menziesii's forest diversity.

=== Habitat ===
Nothofagus menziesii has a broad altitudinal range of about 0–1,280 m (0–4,199 ft) above sea level and occurs in lowland and montane forests, although the habitat of N. menziesii can differ by elevation and geography. The upper tree line reaches 1,430 m (4,690 ft) on Mount Hikurangi, 1,200–1,280 m (3,940–4,200 ft) in the Tararua Ranges and Nelson, and 910–980 m (2,990–3,220 ft) in western Fiordland. In the North Island, N. menziesii is uncommon below 600 m (2,000 ft). The soil content supporting N. menziesii forests can range widely, from shallow rock outcrops and coarse moraine to deep mineral soils and peats, and is typically classified as weakly to moderately weathering yellow-brown earths. N. menziesii is less tolerated for infertile and "poorly drained soils" compared to its related species. However, N. menziesii is noted as both the slowest-growing and most cold-tolerant species within New Zealand's Nothofagus genus; withstanding temperatures as low as −8 to −15 °C (18 to 5 °F).

== Ecology ==
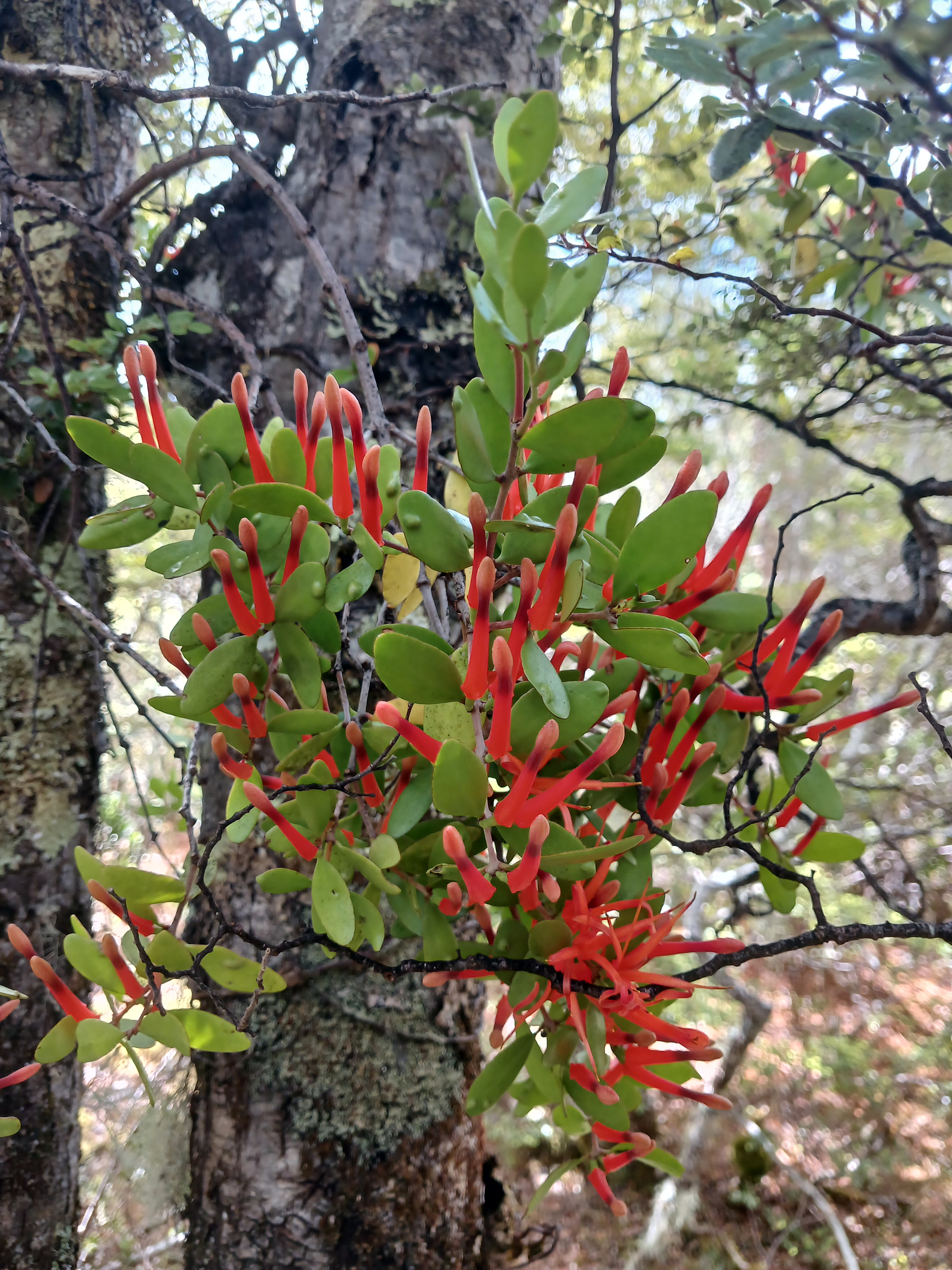
Peraxilla tetrapetala, an endemic mistletoe species; N. menziesii is a host for this species.

Kākā (Nestor meridionalis) occasionally visit N. menziesii specimens, deeply scarring the branches and trunk of the tree while searching for the larvae of the pūriri moth (Aenetus virescens). Peter Wardle's revision of the species mentioned this is practised by kākā in the North Island. Between the years 1851–1926, deer were introduced to New Zealand, deer frequently browse the seedlings and young plants of N. menziesii, which is also the most commonly found food in the stomachs of both red deer (Cervus elaphus) specifically and wapiti (Cervus canadensis), although never in large quantities. Across New Zealand, deer consume the foliage of the tree, often leading to the death of seedlings within forests. Despite this, seedlings growing in open areas tend to survive more robustly; they are better equipped to endure browsing, but frequently become densely hedged due to grazing pressure. A study conducted in 1958, based on direct observations and analysis of stomach contents, found no evidence suggesting that common brushtail possums (Trichosurus vulpecula) consume parts of N. menziesii trees. Despite this, Wardle's 1967 revision of the species recorded moderate browsing of its buds and leaves. Common brushtail possums have typically not been considered a threat to Nothofagus forests since they rarely feed on the species. N. menziesii trees are also a host for three threatened endemic mistletoe species: Alepis flavida, Peraxilla colensoi, and P. tetrapetala.

The soils associated with N. menziesii support diverse fungal communities. However, the soil in canopy communities, including ectomycorrhizal and non-ectomycorrhizal fungi, are comparatively "less rich" in diversity than terrestrial fungi. New Zealand botanist G. H. Cunningham recorded many species of fungi in the families Polyporaceae and Thelephoraceae saprophytic on dead stems of N. menziesii. Ectotrophic species of the Agaric genera, such as Cortinarius and Inocybe, have also been recorded by another study. A study published in the New Zealand Journal of Botany in the year 2002, recorded nine hundred-six fungi taxa that are "closely associated" with New Zealand's Nothofagus species, fifty-six of which are host-specialised to N. menziesii.

In pistillate specimens, flowers grow at the tips of the shoots, while staminate flowers develop on the lower sides of the same shoots. N. menziesii's flowers are presumed to be pollinated by the wind. N. menziesii is recognised as one of the most flammable tree species in New Zealand. N. menziesii's poor adaptation to fire resistance and flammability reduction suggests that it has not evolved protective traits against fire.

=== Phenology ===
Botanist Peter Haase conducted an ecological study of N. menziesii near Otira in 1987. In his study, Haase mentioned that after N. menziesii establishes life, it surpasses neighbouring trees in growth rate and reaches greater canopy heights at maturity. This advantage becomes especially evident in montane and subalpine forests, where surrounding vegetation grows increasingly in comparison. N. menziesii has a periodic radial stand expansion over a 300–500 year period, gradually spreading into nearby forests. N. menziesii's marginal spread averages approximately 10 m (33 ft) per century (100 years).

The seeds are dispersed by the wind. Botanist R. B. Allen found that seeds can be up to 6 km (3.7 mi) away from a parent tree. In 1988, Allen studied the growth rate of specimens in The Catlins. He discovered that the majority of seedlings had either surpassed a height of 35 cm (14 in) in height within 13 years or had died. However, a small fraction of suppressed seedlings remained under 35 cm (14 in) in height for as long as 25 years. The relationship between the diameter and age of stems exceeding 10 cm (3.9 in) in diameter at breast height (DBH) was weak. The growth rate in specimens in diameter differed in variation, from 0.30 to 8.52 mm per year.

== Uses ==
The timber of mature Nothofagus is valued in New Zealand for its use in the making of cabinets and other applications. Despite the timber being considered a versatile general-purpose material, it is typically not durable outdoors. However, its timber is used for flooring, furniture, and panelling. N. menziesii timber has also been used for pulpwood. N. menziesii was first cultivated in the United Kingdom in 1912, with cultivation first starting on the Isles of Scilly at Tresco Abbey. N. menziesii is well-adapted to grow in various climates of the United Kingdom, thriving in both colder weather in Scotland and the warmer and drier conditions in Southern England. At Westonbirt Arboretum in Gloucestershire, N. menziesii grows steadily, although "not with the same vigour" as other Nothofagus species.

=== In Māori culture ===
New Zealand's Nothofagus species are of great importance to Māori, who consider all species to be taonga (treasures). Nothofagus forests were also important food sources, as mast seeding of Nothofagus species caused kiore (Rattus exulans) populations to feed on the seeds of tree, therefore enabling Māori group harvestings in the forests. Nothofagus timber was crafted into fishing hooks, while the bark of N. menziesii and other bark from Nothofagus species was used in dyeing fibres for weaving purposes of harakeke (Phormium tenax) and tī kōuka (Cordyline australis). Māori also used the chipped bark from the tree as bait for fishing.

== Conservation ==
Its conservation status was assessed by the IUCN Red List in 2017 as "Least Concern", and its population trend was evaluated as "Stable". Its assessment in the New Zealand Threat Classification System was evaluated in 2023 was evaluated as "Not Threatened".

== Works cited ==
Journals

- Allen, R. B. (14 April 1986). "Ecology of Nothofagus menziesii in the Catlins Ecological Eegion, South-east Otago, New Zealand (I) seed production, viability, and dispersal". New Zealand Journal of Botany. 25 (1): 11–16. doi:10.1080/0028825X.1987.10409953. ISSN 0028-825X.
- Allen, R. B. (1 May 1988). "Ecology of Nothofagus menziesii in the Catlins Ecological Region South-east Otago, New Zealand (III) growth and population structure". New Zealand Journal of Botany. 26 (2): 281–295. doi:10.1080/0028825X.1988.10410118. ISSN 0028-825X.
- Crowley, Dan; Langhorne, Joanna (10 March 2025). "1123. Nothofagus menziesii (Hook. f.) Oerst.: Nothofagaceae". Curtis's Botanical Magazine. doi:10.1111/curt.12611. ISSN 1355-4905.
- Forsyth, Dm; Thomson, C; Hartley, Lj; MacKenzie, Di; Price, R; Wright, Ef; Mortimer, Jaj; Nugent, G; Wilson, L; Livingstone, P (2 March 2011). "Long-term changes in the relative abundances of introduced deer in New Zealand estimated from faecal pellet frequencies". New Zealand Journal of Zoology. 38 (3): 237–249. doi:10.1080/03014223.2011.592200. ISSN 0301-4223.
- Haase, Peter (31 March 1989). "A population study of an isolated stand of Nothofagus menziesii near Otira, South Island, New Zealand". New Zealand Journal of Botany. 27 (1): 49–57. doi:10.1080/0028825X.1989.10410143. ISSN 0028-825X.
- Heenan, Peter B.; Smissen, Rob D. (12 November 2013). "Revised circumscription of Nothofagus and recognition of the segregate genera Fuscospora, Lophozonia, and Trisyngyne (Nothofagaceae)". Phytotaxa. 146 (1): 1. doi:10.11646/phytotaxa.146.1.1. ISSN 1179-3163.
- James, I.L. (1974). "Mammals and Beech (Nothofagus) Forests". Proceedings (New Zealand Ecological Society). 21. New Zealand Ecological Society: 41–44. ISSN 0077-9946. JSTOR 24061489.
- Johnston, Peter R.; Johansen, Renee B.; Williams, Alexandra F.R.; Paula Wikie, J.; Park, Duckchul (2012). "Patterns of fungal diversity in New Zealand Nothofagus forests". Fungal Biology. 116 (3): 401–412. doi:10.1016/j.funbio.2011.12.010. ISSN 1878-6146.
- Jordan, Gregory J.; Larcombe, Matthew J. (25 February 2025). "Nothofagus in Australia and New Zealand". Curtis's Botanical Magazine. doi:10.1111/curt.12602. ISSN 1355-4905.
- Nilsen, Andy R.; Teasdale, Suliana E.; Guy, Paul L.; Summerfield, Tina C.; Orlovich, David A. (24 January 2020). "Fungal diversity in canopy soil of silver beech, Nothofagus menziesii (Nothofagaceae)". PLOS One. 15 (1). doi:10.1371/journal.pone.0227860. ISSN 1932-6203.
- Rawlence, Nicolas J.; Potter, Benjamin C. M.; Dussex, Nic; Scarsbrook, Lachie; Orlovich, David A.; Waters, Jonathan M.; McGlone, Matt; Knapp, Michael (2 January 2021). "Plio-Pleistocene environmental changes shape present day phylogeography of New Zealand's southern beeches (Nothofagaceae)". New Zealand Journal of Botany. 59 (1): 55–71. doi:10.1080/0028825X.2020.1791915. ISSN 0028-825X.
- Steed‐Mundin, Olivia (10 March 2025). "The Southern Beeches: an introduction to the genus Nothofagus Blume". Curtis's Botanical Magazine. doi:10.1111/curt.12603. ISSN 1355-4905.
- Vento, Bárbara; Agrain, Federico; Puebla, Garbriela; Pinzon, Diego (2023). "Phylogenetic relationships in genus Nothofagus: The role of Antarctic fossil leaves". Acta Palaeontologica Polonica. 68. doi:10.4202/app.01029.2022. ISSN 1732-2421.
- Vento, Bárbara; Agrain, Federico; Puebla, Griselda (2 January 2024). "Ancient Antarctica: the early evolutionary history of Nothofagus". Historical Biology. 36 (1): 136–146. doi:10.1080/08912963.2022.2150549. ISSN 0891-2963.
- Wardle, P. (30 November 1967). "Biological flora of New Zealand: 2. Nothofagus menziesii (Hook.F) OERST. (Fagaceae) silver beech". New Zealand Journal of Botany. 5 (2): 276–302. doi:10.1080/0028825X.1967.10428746. ISSN 0028-825X.
- Wollenweber, Eckhard; Stevens, Jan F; Dörr, Marion; Rozefelds, Andrew C (2003). "Taxonomic significance of flavonoid variation in temperate species of Nothofagus". Phytochemistry. 62 (7): 1125–1131. doi:10.1016/S0031-9422(02)00666-0. ISSN 0031-9422.
- Wyse, Sarah V.; Perry, George L. W.; O'Connell, Dean M.; Holland, Phillip S.; Wright, Monique J.; Hosted, Catherine L.; Whitelock, Samuel L.; Geary, Ian J.; Maurin, Kévin J. L.; Curran, Timothy J. (2016). "A quantitative assessment of shoot flammability for 60 tree and shrub species supports rankings based on expert opinion". International Journal of Wildland Fire. 25 (4): 466. doi:10.1071/WF15047. hdl:10182/6884. ISSN 1049-8001.

Websites

- Barstow, M.; Baldwin, H.; Rivers, M. C. (15 March 2017). Nothofagus menziesii. IUCN Red List (Report). doi:10.2305/iucn.uk.2017-3.rlts.t61918019a61918061.en. Archived from the original on 29 April 2025.
- Ward, M. D. (2025). "Lophozonia menziesii". New Zealand Plant Conservation Network. Archived from the original on 28 January 2025.
- "Ngā Rauropi Whakaoranga — Nothofagus menziesii. Tawhai. Silver beech". Manaaki Whenua – Landcare Research. 2020. Archived from the original on 30 January 2025.
- "Nothofagus antarctica". New Zealand Plant Conservation Network. 2025. Archived from the original on 27 July 2024.
