= Z. maculata =

Z. maculata may refer to:

- Zantedeschia maculata, a plant native to southern Africa
- Zelleria maculata, an ermine moth
- Zomicarpella maculata, a plant native to Colombia
