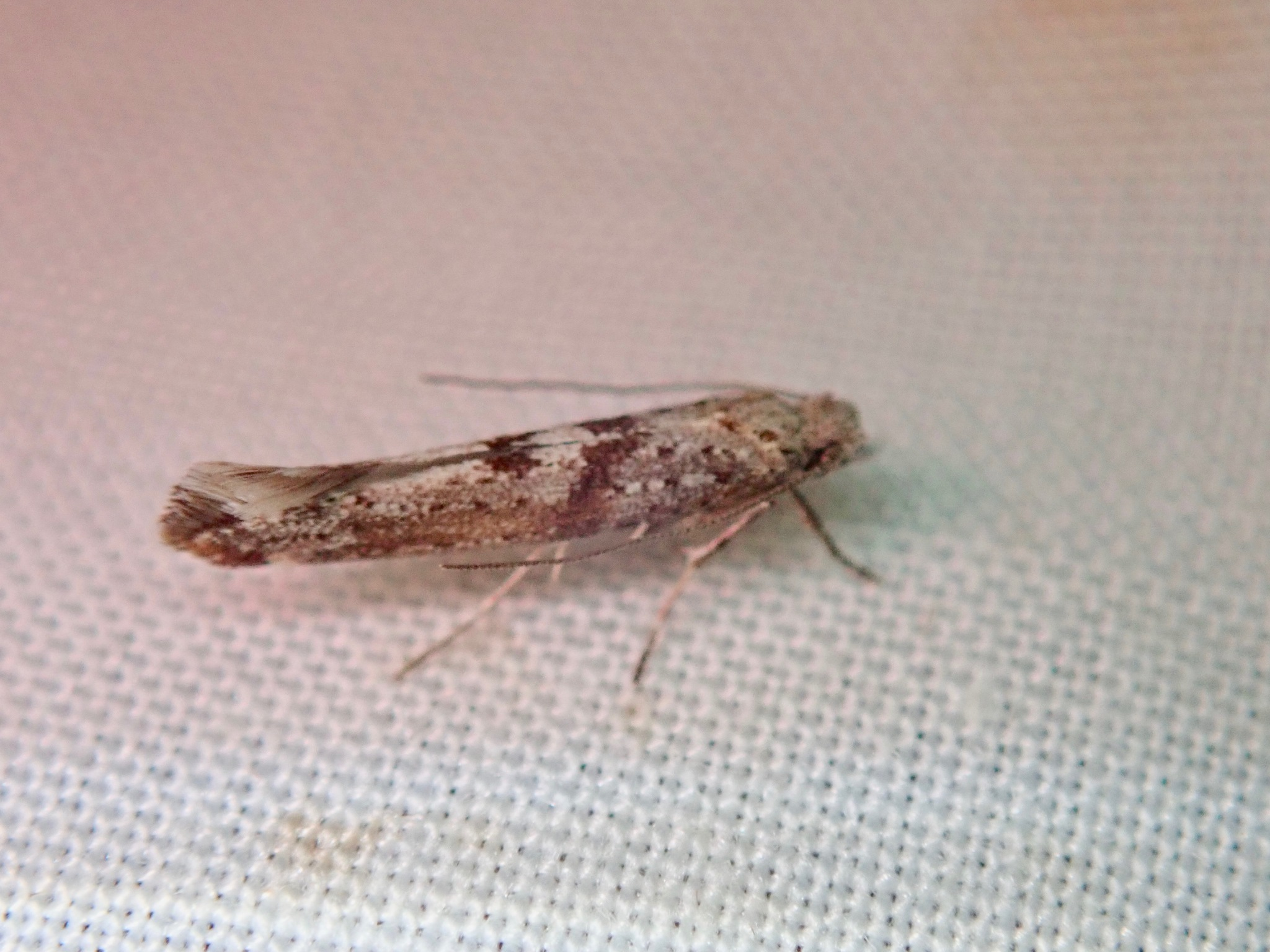

Scientific classification
- Kingdom: Animalia
- Phylum: Arthropoda
- Class: Insecta
- Order: Lepidoptera
- Family: Yponomeutidae
- Genus: Zelleria
- Species: Z. rorida

Binomial name
- Zelleria rorida Philpott, 1918

= Zelleria rorida =

Species of moth endemic to New Zealand

Zelleria rorida is a moth in the family Yponomeutidae. It is endemic to New Zealand.
