= Zelleria abisella =

Scientific classification
- Domain: Eukaryota
- Kingdom: Animalia
- Phylum: Arthropoda
- Class: Insecta
- Order: Lepidoptera
- Family: Yponomeutidae
- Genus: Zelleria
- Species: Z. abisella

Binomial name
- Zelleria abisella (Chretien, 1910)

Synonyms
- Argyresthia abisella Chretien, 1910

Species of moth

Zelleria abisella is a moth of the family Yponomeutidae. It is found in France.
