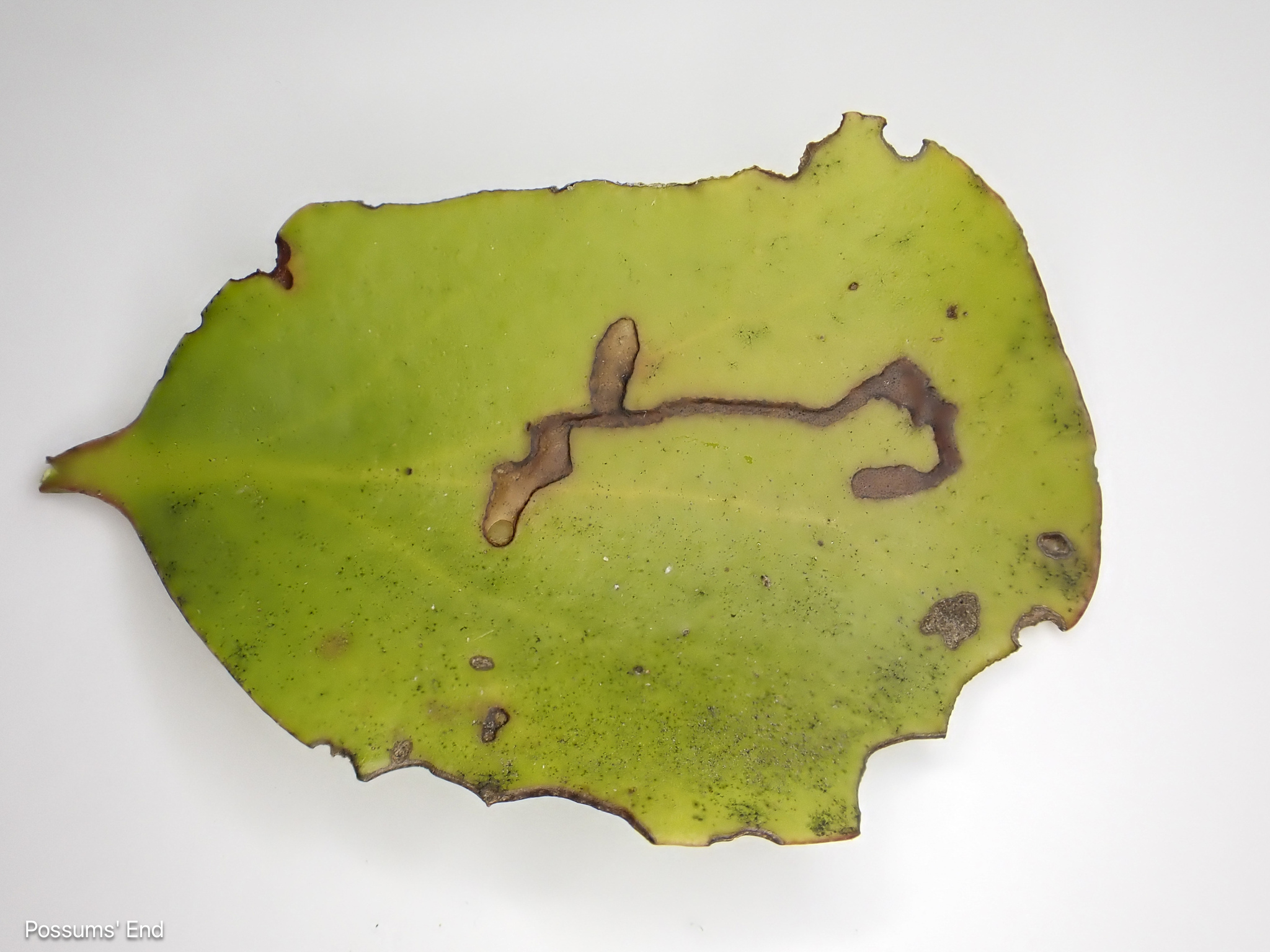
- Evidence of presence on a mistletoe leaf

Conservation status
- Declining (NZ TCS)

Scientific classification
- Kingdom: Animalia
- Phylum: Arthropoda
- Clade: Pancrustacea
- Class: Insecta
- Order: Lepidoptera
- Family: Yponomeutidae
- Genus: Zelleria
- Species: Z. sphenota

Binomial name
- Zelleria sphenota (Meyrick, 1889)

Synonyms
- Hofmannia sphenota Meyrick, 1889

= Zelleria sphenota =

Species of moth endemic to New Zealand

Zelleria sphenota, also known as the mistletoe miner, is a species of moth in the family Yponomeutidae. This species is endemic to New Zealand. It is classified as "At Risk, Declining'" by the Department of Conservation.

== Taxonomy ==
This species was first described by Edward Meyrick in 1889 and named Hofmannia sphenota. Meyrick used a specimen he collected from Riccarton Bush in August. George Hudson discussed the species in his 1928 book The Butterflies and Moths of New Zealand using the name Zelleria sphenota. The holotype specimen of this species is held at the Natural History Museum, London. The genus level classification of this moth is currently regarded as unsatisfactory. As such the species is also known as Zelleria (s.l.) sphenota.

== Description ==
The larvae of this species are green in colour.

Meyrick described the male adult of the species as follows:

♂ 13mm. Head and antennae light ochreous-grey. Palpi grey. Thorax light ochreous. Abdomen whitish-ochreous. Legs fuscous, posterior pair ochreous-whitish. Forewings very elongate, very narrow parallel-sided, long-pointed, acute; pale ochreous, thinly and irregularly sprinkled with dark fuscous and whitish; basal half of costa dotted with black; a moderately-broad ill-defined cloudy-white streak along inner margin from base to anal angle, pointed at extremities, interrupted at 2/3 by a small spot of ground-colour; a cloudy inwardly-oblique dark fuscous mark at 1/3 from near costa to near inner margin: cilia ochreous-grey-whitish, round apex ochreous, with base white, a grey line, and three cloudy dark grey bars. Hindwings pale whitish-grey; cilia ochreous-grey-whitish.

== Distribution ==
This species is endemic to New Zealand. This species has occurred in Taupō, Nelson, Marlborough Sounds, Mid Canterbury and Southland. However it is likely extinct in the North Island.

== Behaviour and life cycle ==
Initially the larvae of this species are leaf miners but as they mature they mine the stems of their host plants, finally moving on to consuming the leaves and flowers. They prepare for pupation by forming a white silk cocoon that is normally attached to the stem of their host plant. This stage can last as little as ten days. Adults emerge between the months of August and February.

== Host plants ==
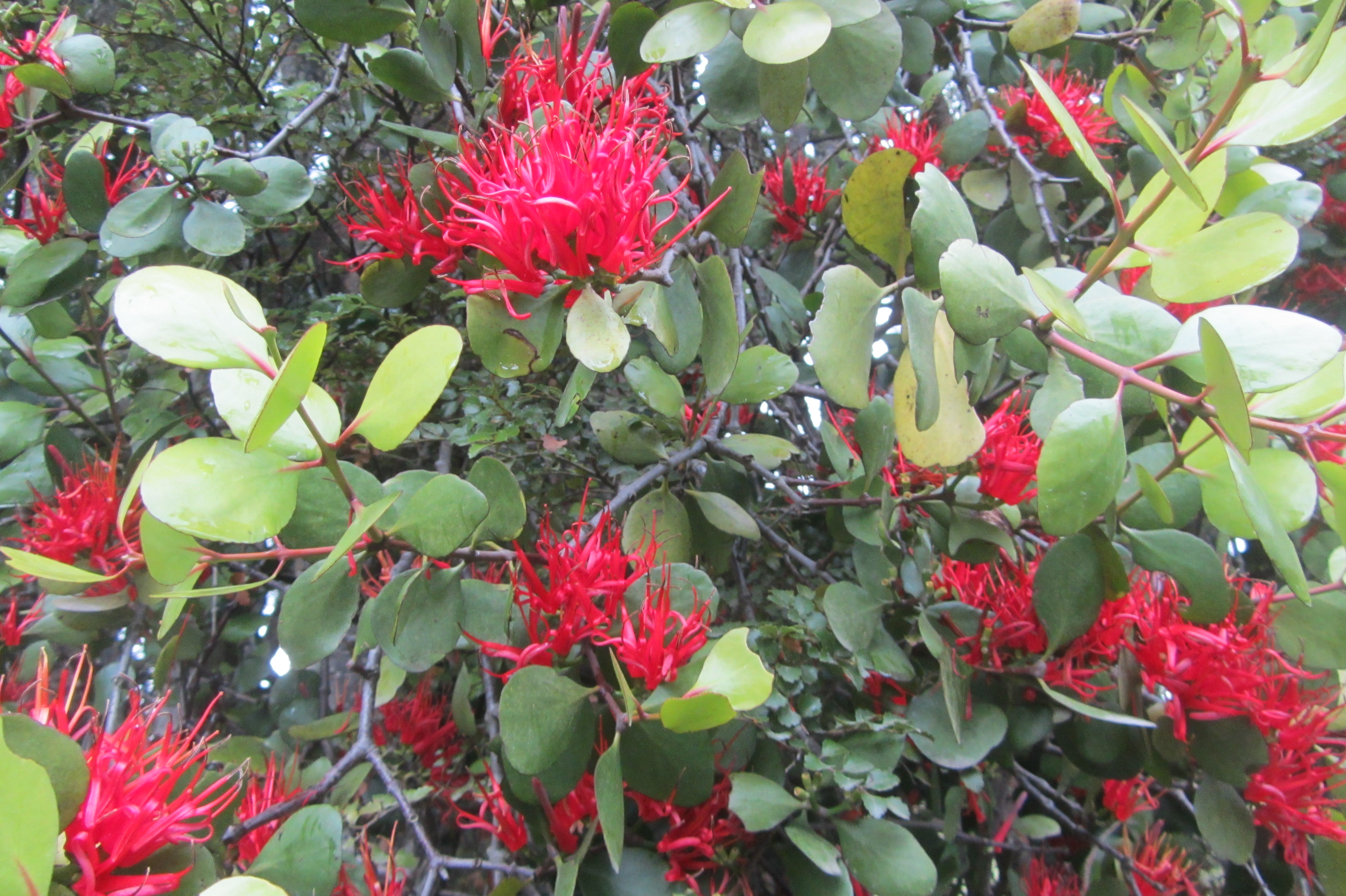
Peraxilla colensoi, host species of Z. sphenota.

The host plants of this species are native leafy mistletoe. These include the species Ileostylus micranthus, Peraxilla colensoi and P. tetrapetala.

== Conservation status ==
This moth is classified under the New Zealand Threat Classification system as being "At Risk, Declining". This is as a result of the decline of its host species brought about through the browsing of possums.
