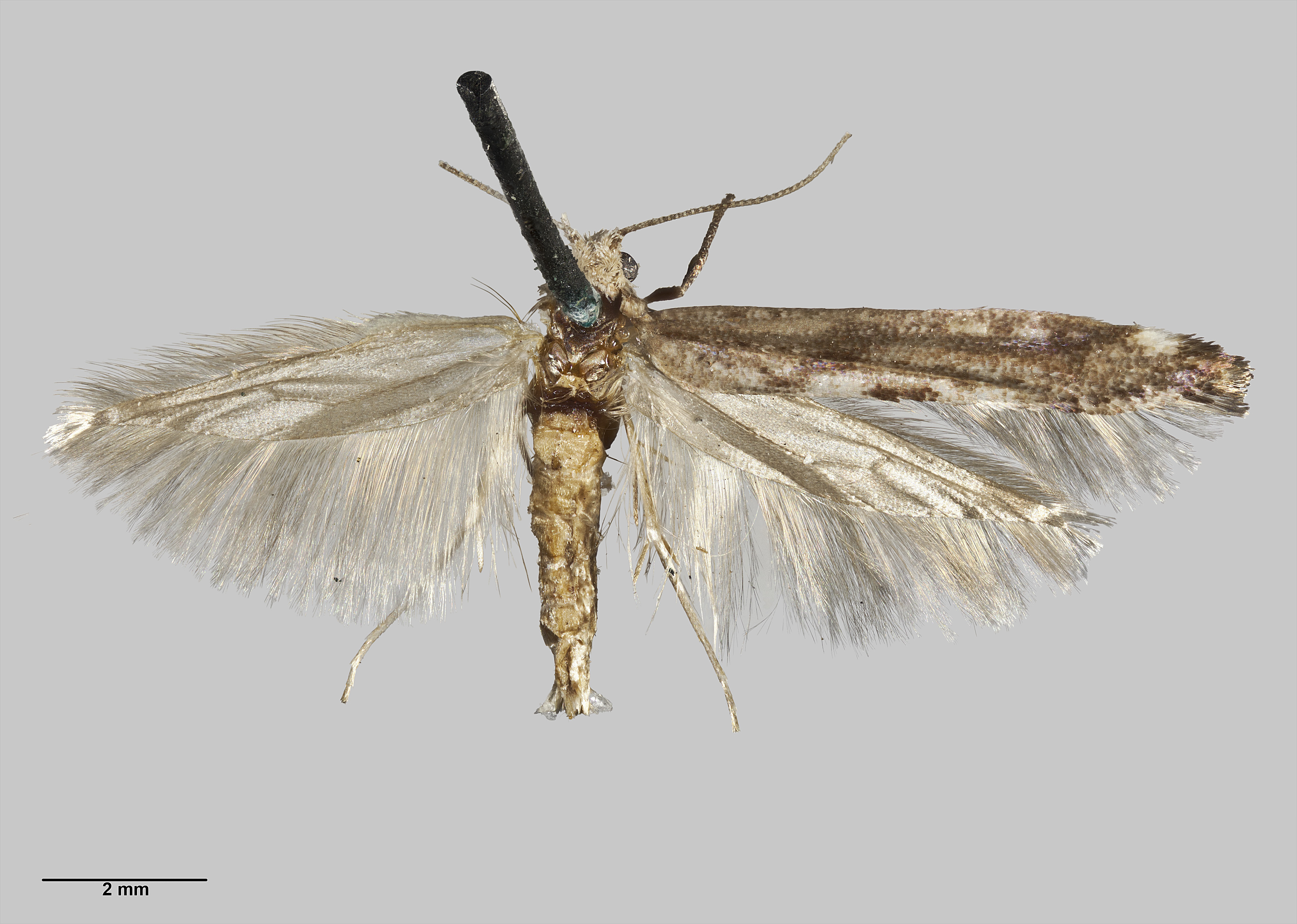
- Holotype specimen held at Auckland Museum

Scientific classification
- Kingdom: Animalia
- Phylum: Arthropoda
- Class: Insecta
- Order: Lepidoptera
- Family: Yponomeutidae
- Genus: Zelleria
- Species: Z. maculata

Binomial name
- Zelleria maculata Philpott, 1930

= Zelleria maculata =

Species of moth

Zelleria maculata is a moth species of the family Yponomeutidae. This species was described by Alfred Philpott in 1930. It is endemic to New Zealand and is found on both the North and South Islands. This species inhabits native forest and prefers interior rather than edge habitat. Larvae feed on species of endangered mistletoe, including Peraxilla tetrapetala and Peraxilla colensoi, first by mining their leaves and then by consuming parts of flowers or leaves. By feeding on flower parts Z. maculata larvae affect the production of seeds of its endangered hosts. Adults are on the wing from August until February and likely have one brood a year. Adult moths rest in a steep angled head down tail up posture. A parasitic wasp in the genus Campoplex predates the larvae of Z. maculata.

== Taxonomy ==
Z. maculata was first described by Alfred Philpott in 1930 using specimens collected at Mount Maungatua, Otago by Charles E. Clarke in December and January. George Hudson discussed and illustrated this species in his 1939 book A supplement to the butterflies and moths of New Zealand. The female holotype specimen is held at the Auckland War Memorial Museum.

== Description ==
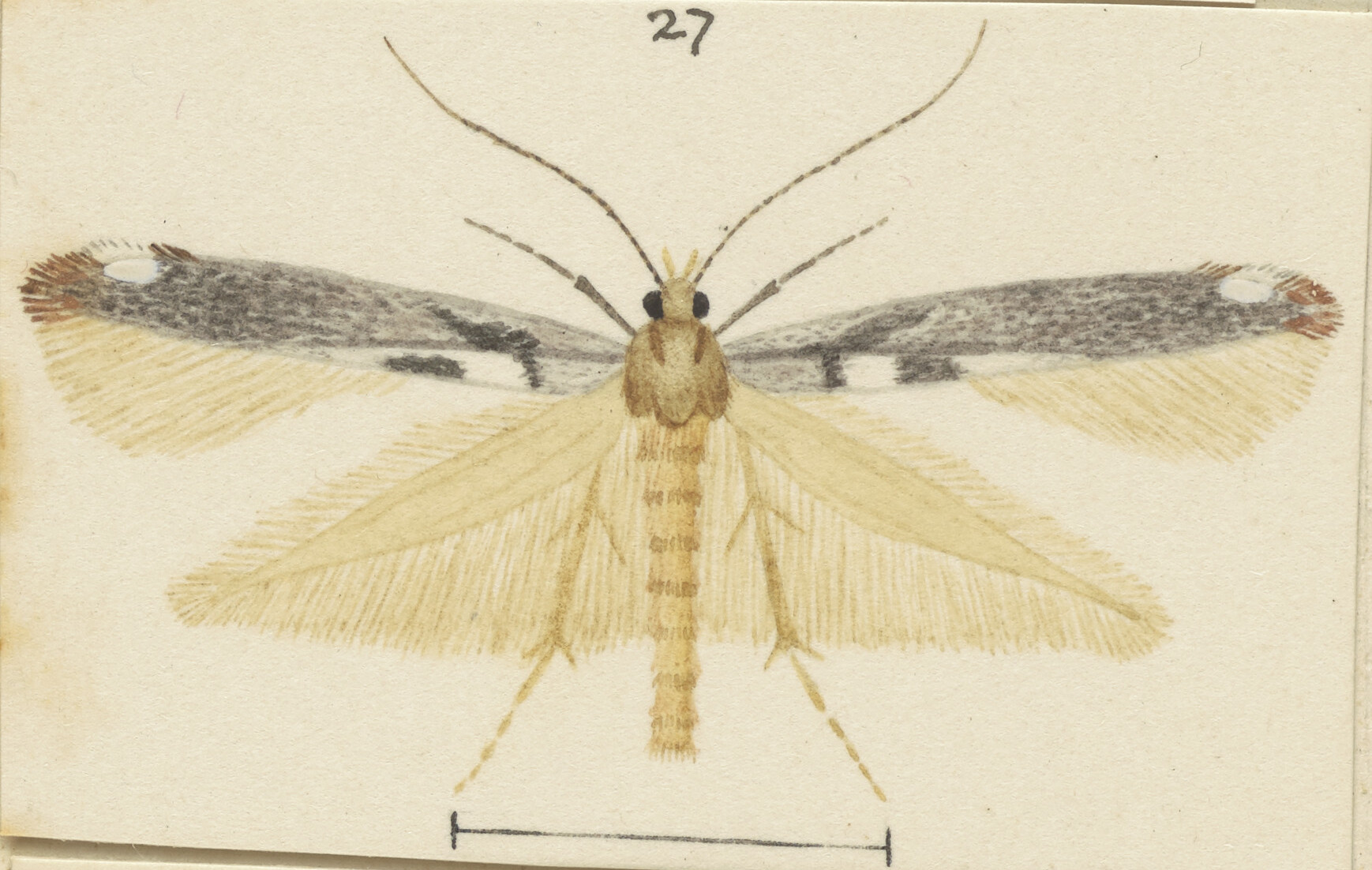
Illustration of male.

The mature larva of this species is green in colour and is 9 mm in length.

Philpott describes this species as follows:

♂. 15-17 mm. Head and thorax whitish grey. Palpi ochreous grey mixed with fuscous. Antennae greyish brown. Abdomen whitish ochreous. Legs ochreous white, anterior pair infuscated. Forewings long, narrow, parallel-sided, apex blunt-pointed, termen extremely oblique; white, densely mixed with pale dull brown; a clearer white streak along dorsum and partly round termen, much interrupted by dark fuscous marks, a fairly large spot on dorsum at 1/2, connecting with an indistinct oblique fascia from costa at 1/3, and a similar one at tornus; many indistinct dark fuscous dots on apical 1/2, especially on the lower portion; a distinct white spot on costa before apex, followed by a triangular dark fuscous spot; extreme apex whitish: fringes ochreous grey round termen, dark fuscous round apex, with a dividing whitish patch. Hindwings grey: fringes ochreous grey.

Philpott was of the opinion that the white preapical spot on the forewings of this species is a distinguishing feature. Z. maculata is longer winged than its near relative Z. sphenota.

== Distribution ==
Z. maculata is endemic to New Zealand. It can be found throughout the North and South Islands.

== Habitat and hosts ==
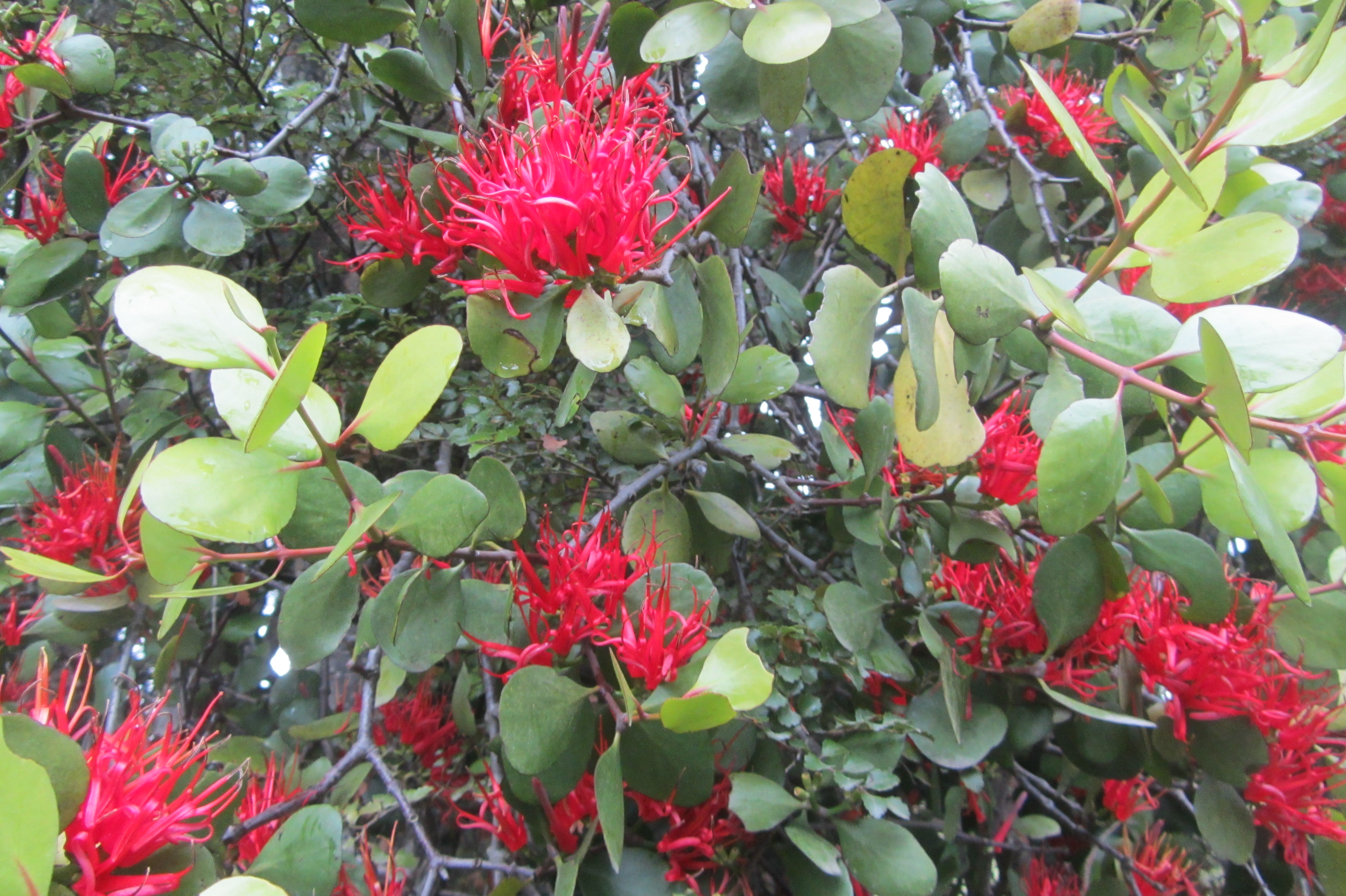
Larval host Peraxilla colensoi flowers.

Adults of this species inhabit native forest at up to 900 m in altitude and prefers the interior of forests, avoiding edge habitat. The larvae feed on Peraxilla tetrapetala and Peraxilla colensoi, endangered mistletoe species that are endemic to New Zealand. It is likely Z. maculata also feeds on the mistletoe species Alepis flavida. Early instars of Z. maculata larvae are leaf miners, while later instars feed externally on the mistletoe species' leaves and flowers, including flower buds. As a result of endangered status of these mistletoe plants, this moth's ability to affect their seed production is important consideration for conservationists attempting to preserve these plants.

== Behaviour ==
When leaf mining, the larvae form "scribble mines" on the edges of the leaves of their host plants. Every few days they move from one mine to another, either on the same leaf or on a nearby leaf. When the larva reaches its fourth instar it leaves its mine to either consume the leaves of its host, mines the stem of developing flower buds and then moves onto the leaves, or consumes the reproductive parts of its host plants flowers. When consuming leaves the larva does this from a silken gallery it forms between overlapping leaves of its host plant.

The mature larva pupates in a white silk spindle-shaped cocoon, covered by a second layer of loose silk, and normally located on the stem of its host plant. It has also been hypothesised that this species also pupates in leaf litter as a result of predated buds being aborted and falling to the ground. Adults emerge from this cocoon in as few as 10 days. It has been hypothesised that this species has only one generation per year.

Adults of this species are on the wing from August until February. The adults rest in an unusual step angled posture of head down, tail up.

== Parasites ==
A wasp in the genus Campoplex has been observed parasitising Z. maculata larvae.
