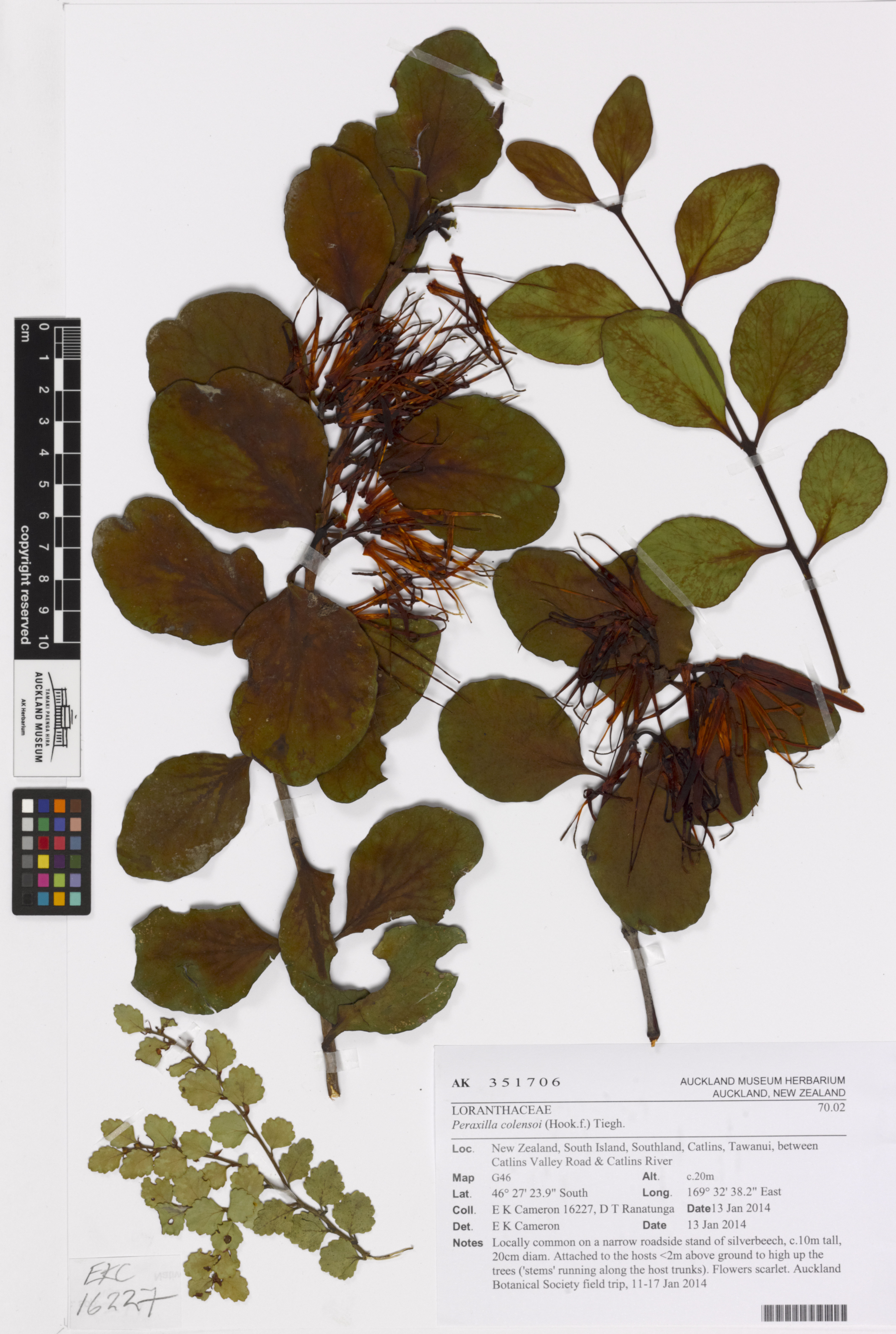
- Herbarium specimen

Scientific classification
- Kingdom: Plantae
- Clade: Tracheophytes
- Clade: Angiosperms
- Clade: Eudicots
- Order: Santalales
- Family: Loranthaceae
- Genus: Peraxilla
- Species: P. colensoi

Binomial name
- Peraxilla colensoi William Colenso

= Peraxilla colensoi =

Species of mistletoe

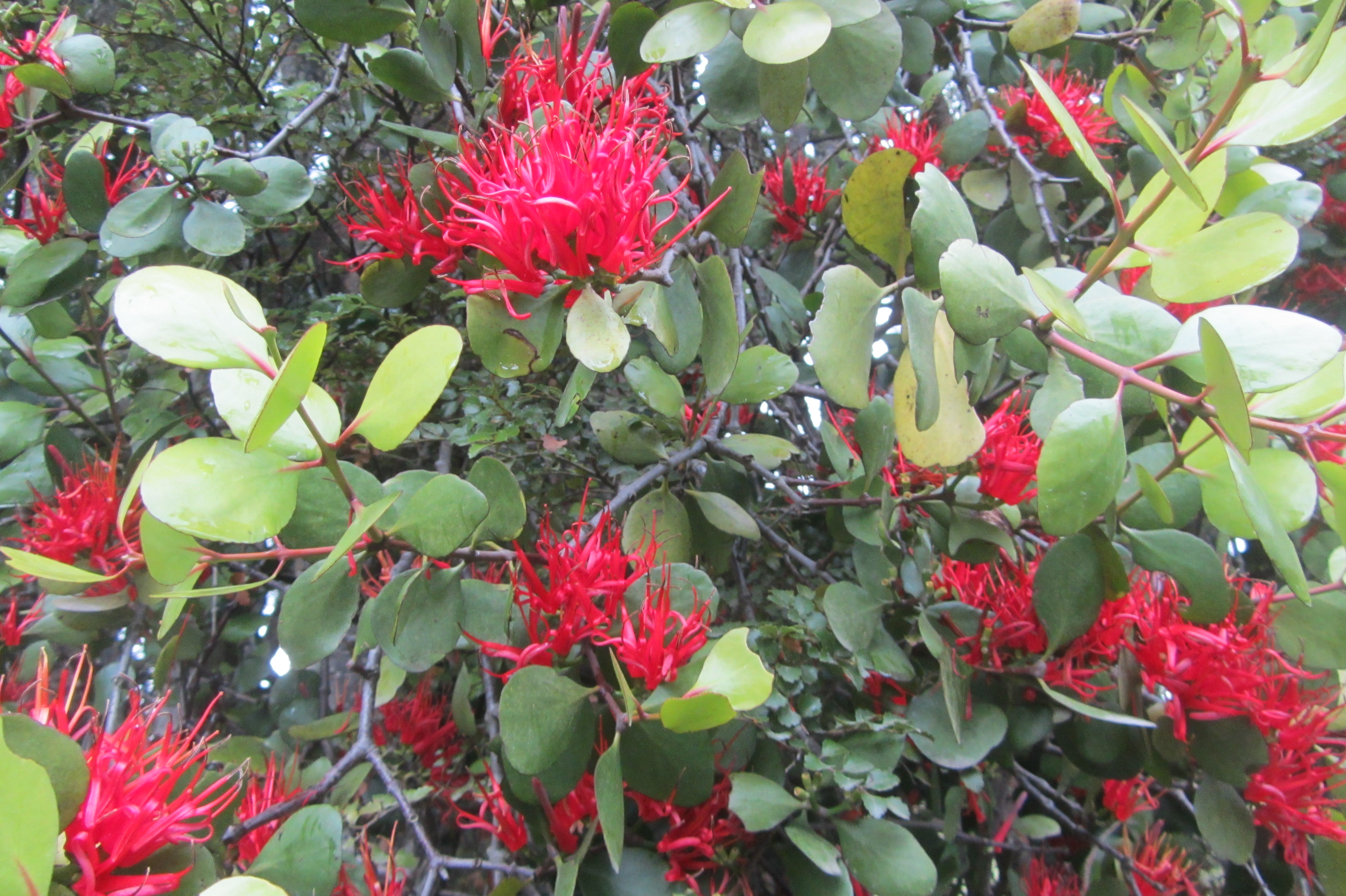
In full bloom

Peraxilla colensoi, also known as pirita or pirinoa (Te Reo Māori) and scarlet mistletoe (English), is a shrubby mistletoe endemic to New Zealand that is parasitic primarily on tawai/silver beech (Nothofagus menziesii). When flowering, P. colensoi is called korukoru by in Te Reo Māori. It was described by Joseph Dalton Hooker in 1844 as Loranthus colensoi.

== Description ==
P. colensoi is a parasitic plant that relies on tawai/silver beech to grow on and provide most of its nutrient requirements. It is shrubby, up to 3 meters wide, with broad, leathery leaves that grow up to 8 cm long and have a red edge.

=== Flowers ===
The common name is derived from the red and orange petals of tubular flowers that bloom from October to January. The flowers grow in groups, and are usually found in clumps of 3 to 10. The flower heads usually grow up to 60 mm long. The buds of the flower are unable to open up by themselves. They require assistance from birds to open, as they try to extract nectar.

=== Fruit ===
Peraxilla colensoi also has fruits that grow to be small and oval shaped and are a yellowish golden color when ripe.

== Distribution ==
Peraxilla colensoi is endemic to the silver beech forests of the North and South Islands of New Zealand. It is found in the North from Te Aroha and the Raukūmara Range, to The Catlins in the South.

The type specimen was collected by William Colenso at Waikaremoana.

== Habitat and ecology ==
=== Hosts ===
As a parasitic plant, the habitat of P. colensoi is largely its tawai/silver beech hosts, which make up 85.9% of total hosts. It is, however, also found on around 16 other hosts, including two other Nothofagus species (N. fusca and N. solandri), as well as Metrosideros, Pittosporum, Pyrus, Robinia, and Rosa. As a hemiparasitic plant, it derives nutrients and water from its hosts, but also derives energy from the sun through photosynthesis.

The abundance of Peraxilla colensoi follows a structural gradient in forests. Forests that contain open-canopied, all-aged forests had higher densities of Peraxilla colensoi, while a dense-canopied, even-aged forest contained little to no Peraxilla. Peraxilla tends to be most common where bird appearances are more frequent. Larger host trees are capable of supporting higher volumes of mistletoes than smaller host trees. This is likely because larger trees have a higher number of perches for birds, which disperse its seeds by excreting and regurgitating them.

=== Pollinators and dispersers ===
Tūī (Prosthemadera novaeseelandiae) and bellbird (Anthonis melanura) pollinate and disperse P. colensoi. These birds excrete mistletoe seeds onto branches and gradually grow sucker roots known as haustoria.

=== Predators ===
Peraxilla colensoi is browsed by the common brushtail possum, an invasive species in New Zealand. The increase in browsing by this animal has caused a great depletion in the plant species, leading to it being classified At Risk - Declining.

The caterpillar of the endemic moth Zelleria maculata mines the leaves and feeds on the inside flower buds of P. colensoi, affecting the production of seeds.

== Threats ==
Peraxilla colensoi is classified as At Risk - Declining. It is browsed by the common brushtail possum, an invasive species in New Zealand. The increase in browsing by possums has caused great decline to this and other mistletoes. Additionally, possums and other introduced predators have caused decline in the pollinators of P. colensoi, like bellbirds, resulting in some populations being pollination-limited.

== Taxonomy ==
It was described by Joseph Dalton Hooker in 1844 as Loranthus colensoi, using a specimen collected by William Colenso at Lake Waikaremoana. In 1894, Philippe Édouard Léon Van Tieghem moved P. colensoi and P. tetrapetala to the new genus Peraxilla.

=== Etymology ===
colensoi - named after William Colenso (7 November 1811 - 10 February 1899) who was a Cornish Christian missionary to New Zealand, and also a printer, botanist, explorer and politician.
