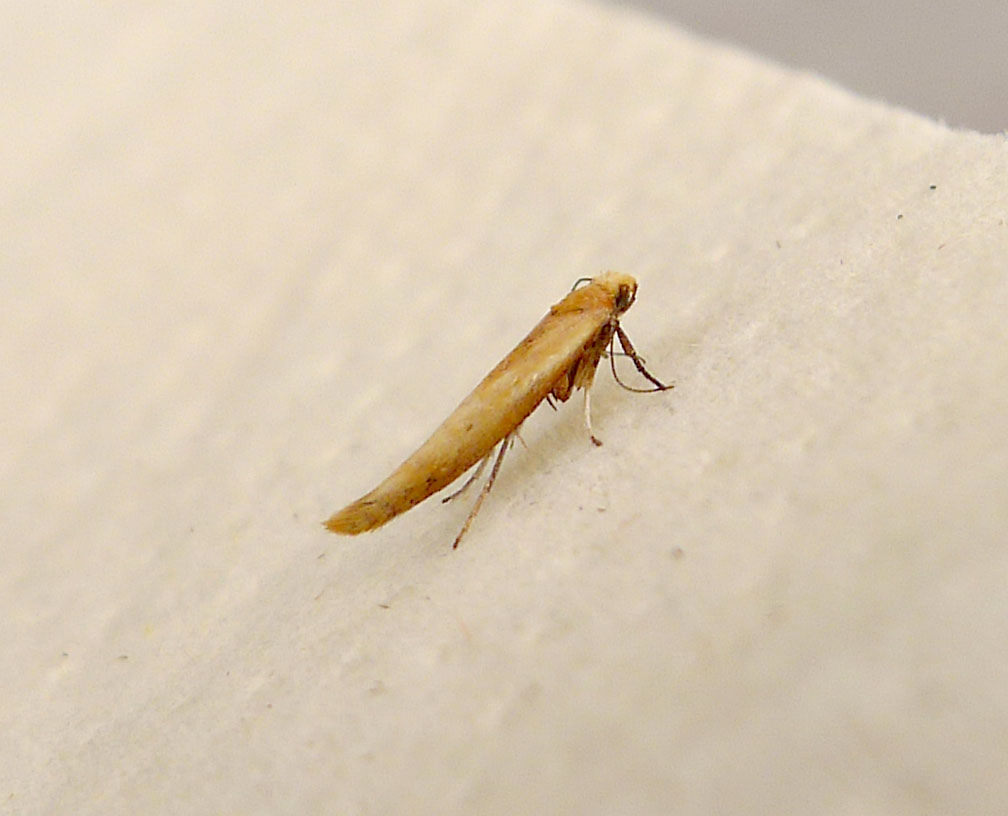
- Zelleria hepariella

Scientific classification
- Kingdom: Animalia
- Phylum: Arthropoda
- Clade: Pancrustacea
- Class: Insecta
- Order: Lepidoptera
- Family: Yponomeutidae
- Subfamily: Yponomeutinae
- Genus: Zelleria; Stainton, 1849

Type species
- Zelleria hepariella Stainton, 1849

Species
- See text

Synonyms
- Eudrymopa Lower, 1908

= Zelleria =

Genus of moths

Zelleria is a genus of moths of the family Yponomeutidae.

== Species ==
- Zelleria abisella - Chrétien, 1910
- Zelleria afflictella - Walker, 1863
- Zelleria alterella - Chrétien, 1910
- Zelleria aphrospora - Meyrick, 1892
- Zelleria araecodes - Meyrick, 1892
- Zelleria arizonica - Braun, 1940
- Zelleria bradleyi - Moriuti, 1963
- Zelleria callidoxa - Meyrick, 1892
- Zelleria chalcoleuca - Meyrick, 1914
- Zelleria cirrhoscia - Meyrick, 1931
- Zelleria citrina - Meyrick, 1892
- Zelleria coniostrepta - Meyrick, 1938
- Zelleria cremnospila - Lower, 1900
- Zelleria cryptica - Meyrick, 1913
- Zelleria cyanoleuca - (Lower, 1908)
- Zelleria cynetica - Meyrick, 1892
- Zelleria deformis - Meyrick,
- Zelleria elongata - Moriuti, 1963
- Zelleria euthysema - Turner, 1923
- Zelleria gracilariella - Busck, 1904
- Zelleria haimbachi - Busck, 1915
- Zelleria hemixipha - Lower, 1900
- Zelleria hepariella - Stainton, 1849
- Zelleria impura - Staudinger, 1880
- Zelleria insignipennella - Stainton, 1849
- Zelleria isopyrrha - Meyrick, 1922
- Zelleria leucoschista - Meyrick, 1931
- Zelleria leucostrota - Meyrick, 1929
- Zelleria loranthivora - Meyrick, 1930
- Zelleria maculata - Philpott, 1930
- Zelleria malacodes - Turner, 1938
- Zelleria memorella - Meyrick, 1892
- Zelleria metriopa - Meyrick, 1933
- Zelleria mystarcha - Meyrick, 1892
- Zelleria oleastrella - Milliére, 1867
- Zelleria orthopleura - Turner, 1923
- Zelleria panceuthes - Turner, 1923
- Zelleria parnassiae - Braun, 1940
- Zelleria pistopis - Meyrick, 1931
- Zelleria plumbeella - Staudinger, 1870
- Zelleria porphyraula - Meyrick, 1927
- Zelleria proterospila - Meyrick, 1892
- Zelleria pyri - Clarke, 1942
- Zelleria pyroleuca - Meyrick, 1892
- Zelleria restrictellus - Chrétien, 1915
- Zelleria ribesella - Busck, 1904
- Zelleria rorida - Philpott, 1918
- Zelleria scambota - Meyrick, 1928
- Zelleria semitincta - Philpott, 1930
- Zelleria sigillata - Meyrick, 1892
- Zelleria sphenota - (Meyrick, 1889)
- Zelleria strophaea - Meyrick,
- Zelleria stylograpta - Meyrick, 1907
- Zelleria wolffi - Klimesch, 1983
