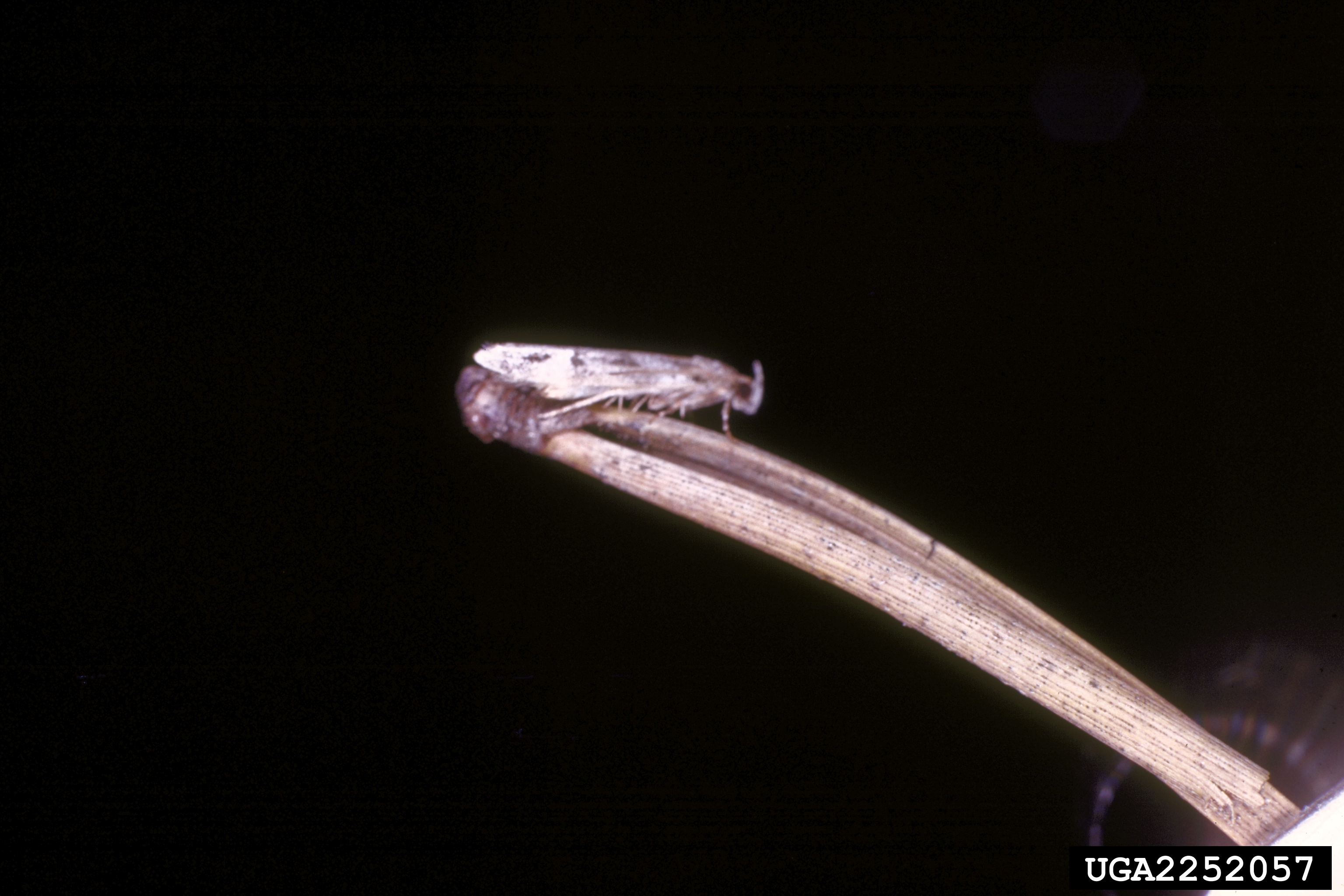

Scientific classification
- Kingdom: Animalia
- Phylum: Arthropoda
- Class: Insecta
- Order: Lepidoptera
- Family: Yponomeutidae
- Genus: Zelleria
- Species: Z. haimbachi

Binomial name
- Zelleria haimbachi Busck, 1915

= Zelleria haimbachi =

Species of moth

Zelleria haimbachi, the pine needle sheathminer, is a moth of the family Yponomeutidae. In North America it is found from British Columbia south of 52° north latitude, east to Quebec and south to California.

The wingspan is about 13 mm.

The larvae feed on Pinus banksiana, Pinus contorta and Pinus ponderosa, and less frequently Pinus resinosa, Pinus banksiana, Pseudotsuga menziesii subsp. glauca, Pinus sylvestris and Picea glauca. It is considered a pest species and can cause outbreaks. In the Canadian province of British Columbia infestations were recorded in: Penticton in 1951, Spences Bridge in 1958, Louis Creek and Scotch Creek in 1962, Clearwater-Vavenby in 1979-1980 and Clearwater-Shuswap in 1985-1992.
