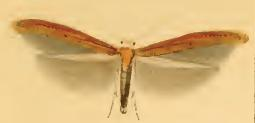

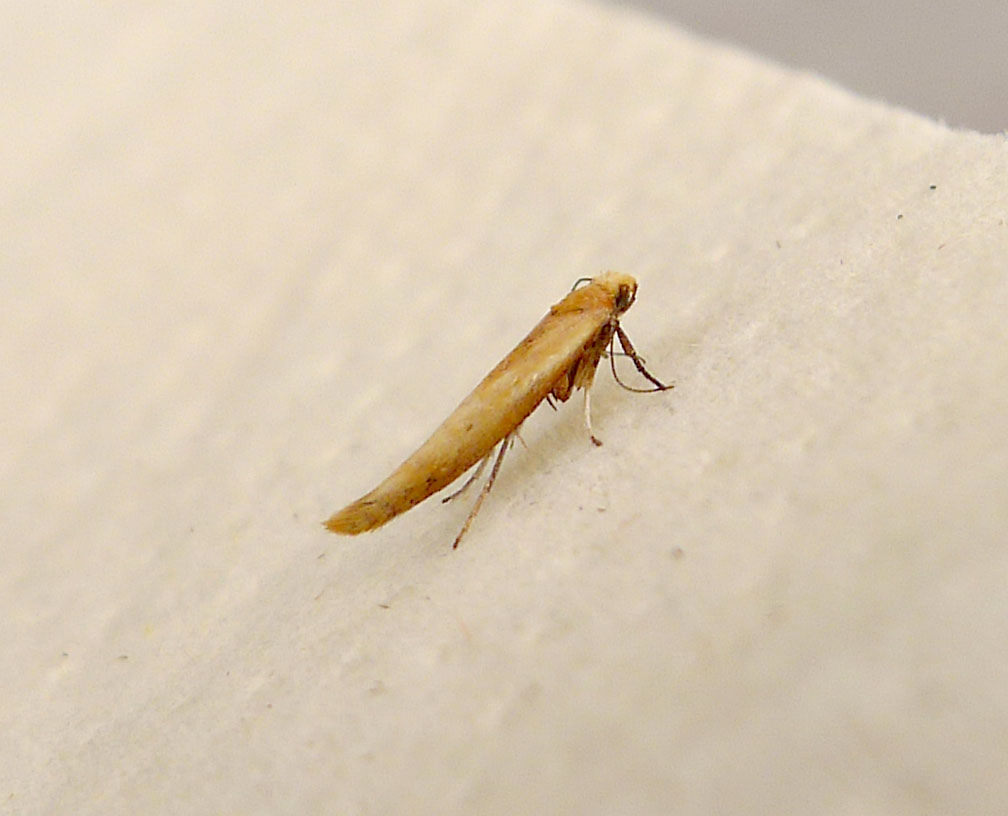

Scientific classification
- Kingdom: Animalia
- Phylum: Arthropoda
- Clade: Pancrustacea
- Class: Insecta
- Order: Lepidoptera
- Family: Yponomeutidae
- Genus: Zelleria
- Species: Z. hepariella

Binomial name
- Zelleria hepariella Stainton, 1849

Synonyms
- Zelleria insignipennella Stainton, 1849; Gracillaria taxella Herrich-Schäffer, 1855; Zelleria phillyrella Millière, 1867; Zelleria fusca Stainton, 1876; Zelleria joannisella Maneval, 1934

= Zelleria hepariella =

Species of moth

Zelleria hepariella is a moth of the family Yponomeutidae. It is found in Europe and northern Asia Minor.

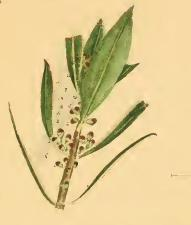
A branch of Phillyrea with larval web

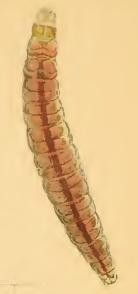
Larva

The wingspan is 12–14 mm. The head varies from reddish-brown to ochreous-whitish. Forewings are red-brown, sometimes suffusedly irrorated with dark fuscous, towards dorsum sometimes obscurely paler; second discal stigma sometimes obscurely dark fuscous. Hindwings dark grey, lighter anteriorly. The larva is light green; dorsal line dark green; head yellowish-brown.

Adults are on wing in July or August depending on the location.

The larvae feed on Fraxinus excelsior, Lonicera and Artemisia.
