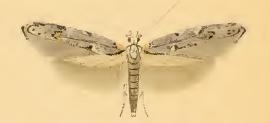

Scientific classification
- Kingdom: Animalia
- Phylum: Arthropoda
- Class: Insecta
- Order: Lepidoptera
- Family: Yponomeutidae
- Genus: Zelleria
- Species: Z. oleastrella

Binomial name
- Zelleria oleastrella (Millière, 1864)

Synonyms
- Tinea oleastrella Millière, 1864

= Zelleria oleastrella =

Species of moth

Zelleria oleastrella is a moth of the family Yponomeutidae. It is found in southern Europe and Turkey.

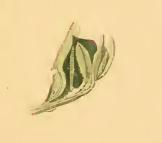
An olive twig with leaves drawn together by larva

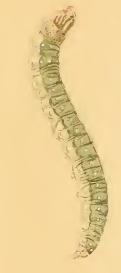
Larva

The wingspan is 12–15 mm. There are five overlapping generations per year with adults on wing year round, but mostly from May to November.

The larvae feed on olive (Olea europaea) and possibly Russian olive (Elaeagnus angustifolia).
