= Zelleria wolffi =

Scientific classification
- Kingdom: Animalia
- Phylum: Arthropoda
- Clade: Pancrustacea
- Class: Insecta
- Order: Lepidoptera
- Family: Yponomeutidae
- Genus: Zelleria
- Species: Z. wolffi

Binomial name
- Zelleria wolffi Klimesch, 1983

Species of moth

Zelleria wolffi is a moth of the family Yponomeutidae. It is found on the Canary Islands and Madeira.
