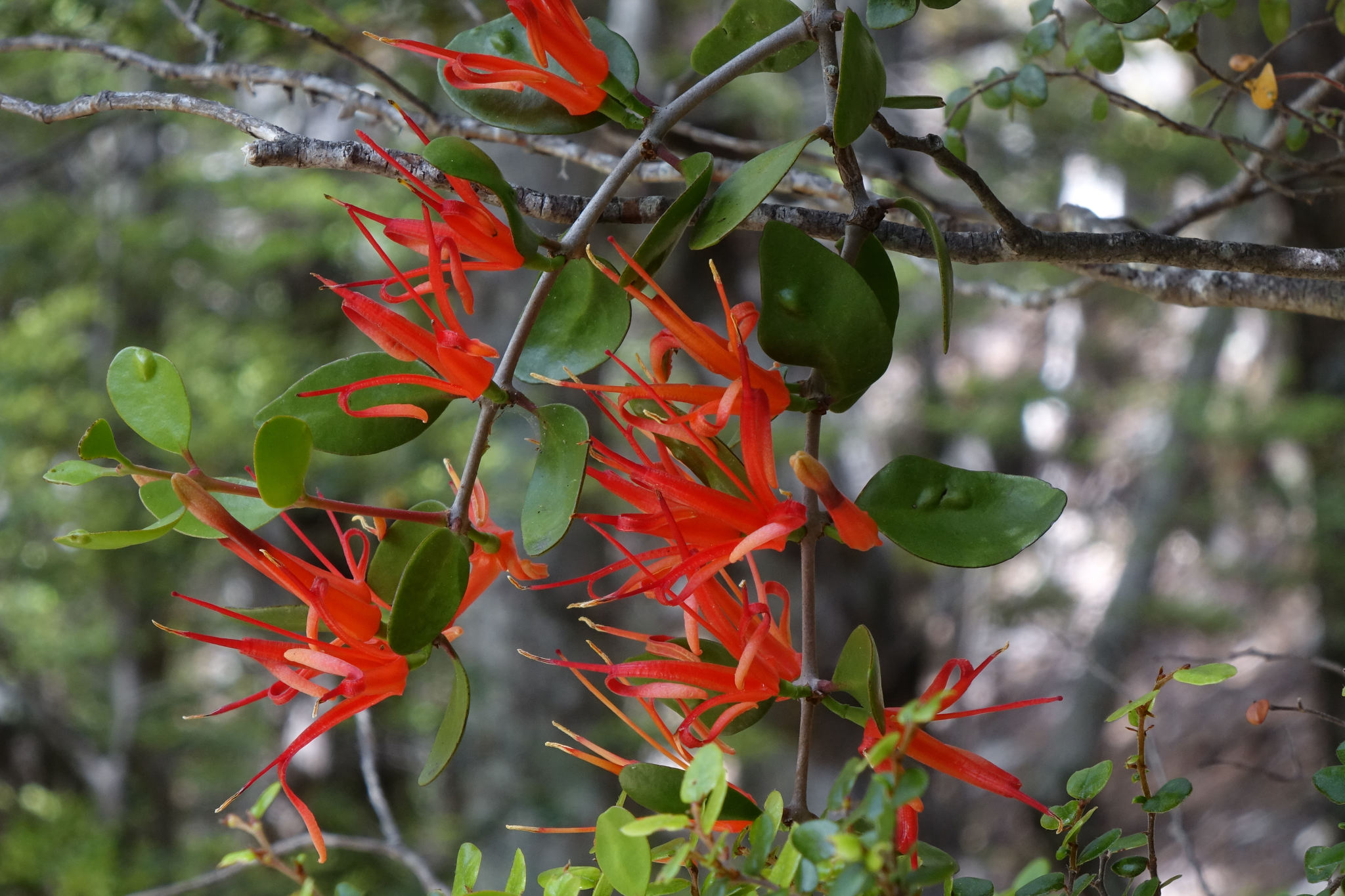
- Peraxilla tetrapetala

Scientific classification
- Kingdom: Plantae
- Clade: Tracheophytes
- Clade: Angiosperms
- Clade: Eudicots
- Order: Santalales
- Family: Loranthaceae
- Genus: Peraxilla; Tiegh.

= Peraxilla =

Genus of mistletoes

Peraxilla is a genus of two showy mistletoe species from New Zealand.

== Species list ==
- Peraxilla colensoi
- Peraxilla tetrapetala
