= Zelleria plumbeella =

Scientific classification
- Domain: Eukaryota
- Kingdom: Animalia
- Phylum: Arthropoda
- Class: Insecta
- Order: Lepidoptera
- Family: Yponomeutidae
- Genus: Zelleria
- Species: Z. plumbeella

Binomial name
- Zelleria plumbeella Staudinger, 1871

Species of moth

Zelleria plumbeella is a moth of the family Yponomeutidae. It is found in Spain.

The moth's typical adult wingspan is 19–21 mm.
