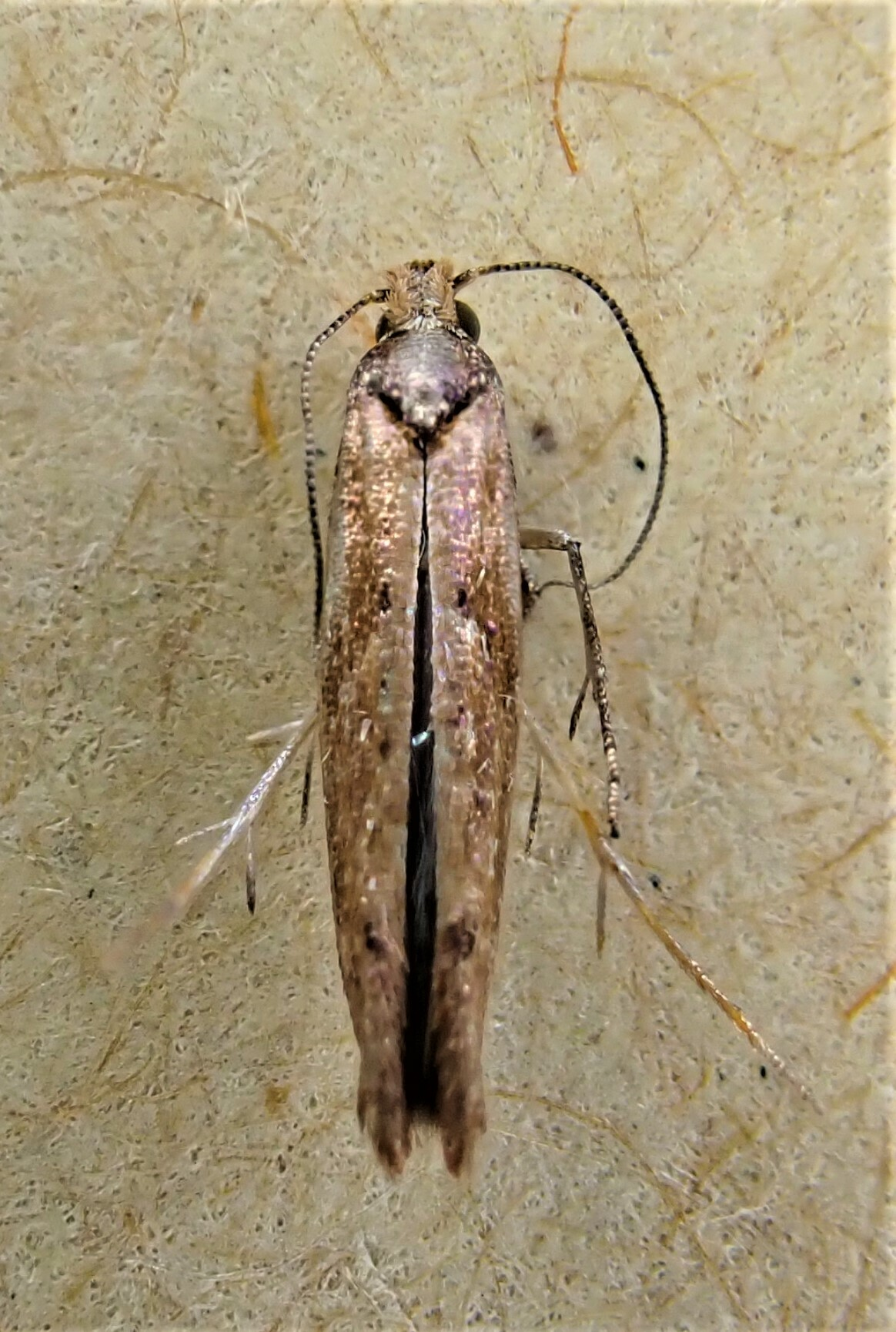

Scientific classification
- Kingdom: Animalia
- Phylum: Arthropoda
- Class: Insecta
- Order: Lepidoptera
- Family: Yponomeutidae
- Genus: Zelleria
- Species: Z. porphyraula

Binomial name
- Zelleria porphyraula Meyrick, 1927

= Zelleria porphyraula =

Species of moth endemic to New Zealand

Zelleria porphyraula is a moth in the family Yponomeutidae. It was first described by Edward Meyrick and is endemic to New Zealand. This species has been observed in both the North and South Islands. The adult of the species is on the wing in November and April.

== Taxonomy ==
This species was first described by Edward Meyrick in 1927. The male holotype specimen was collected in Wellington in April by George Hudson when beating the species Podocarpus totara. The holotype specimen is held at the Natural History Museum, London.

== Description ==
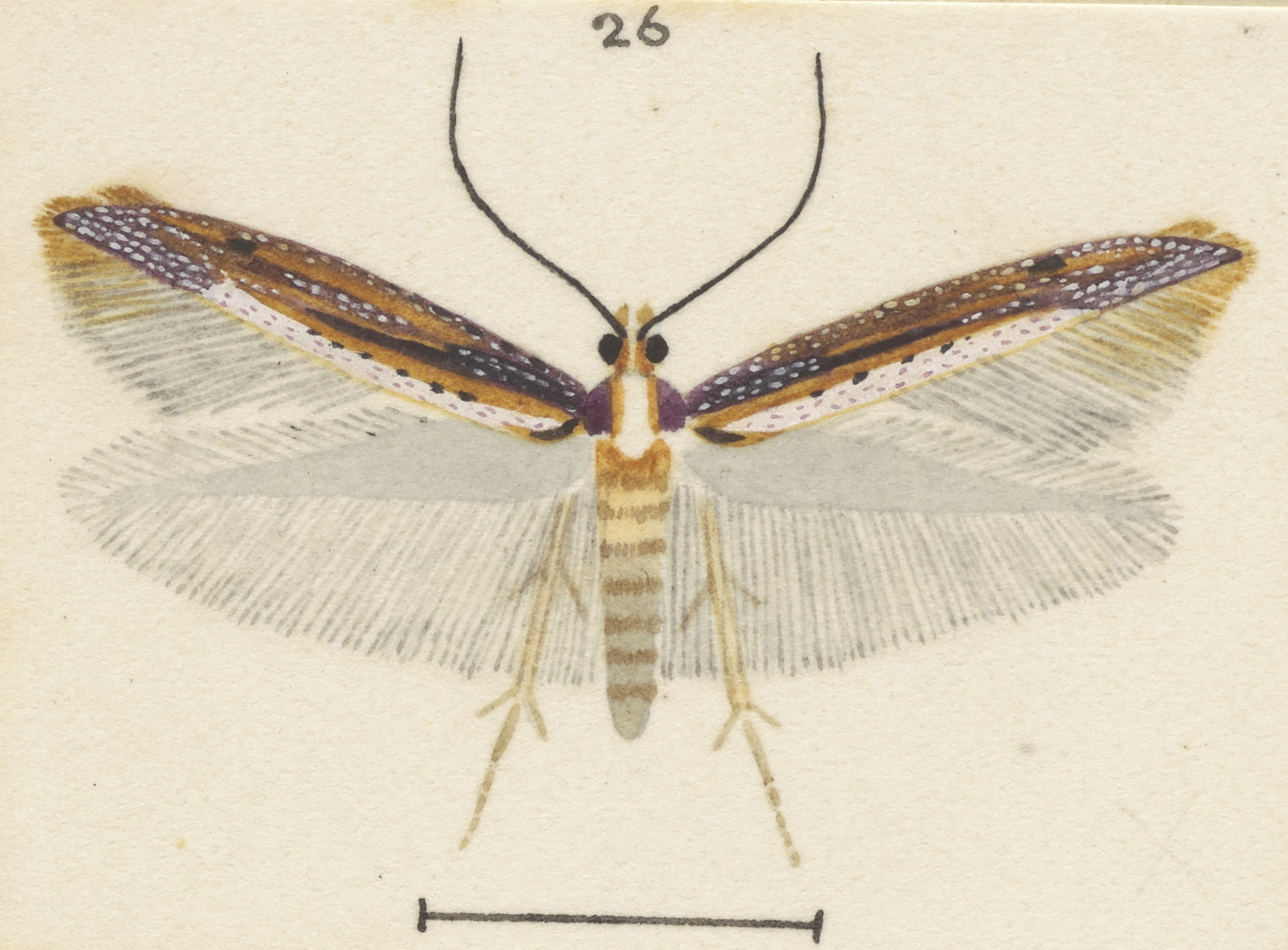
Illustration of Z. porphyraula.

Meyrick described this species as follows:

♂ 13 mm. Head white, forehead and a lateral stripe on crown light fulvous, forehead sprinkled black. Palpi pale grey sprinkled black. Thorax dark bluish-grey, a central whitish streak, tegulae purple. Forewings narrow, costa arched towards pointed apex; bronzy-greyish-ochreous, slightly orange-tinged; costal edge greyish-purple, with some scattered small black dots; sub-costal and median suffused greyish-purple streaks, confluent towards base and terminating in an apical blotch, median interrupted by a whitish patch above tornus; suffused white dots on sub-costal representing discal stigmata and one on median obliquely before first discal representing plical; an irregular white streak above dorsum from near base to middle of wing, sprinkled or dotted black, dorsum beneath this narrowly brownish-ochreous from base to tornus, dorsal edge towards base mottled black; a few white scales towards apex: cilia bronzy-brown, on tornal area light greyish, tips round apex black, at origin of costal cilia some white scales. Hindwings light bluish-grey; cilia light grey.

== Distribution ==
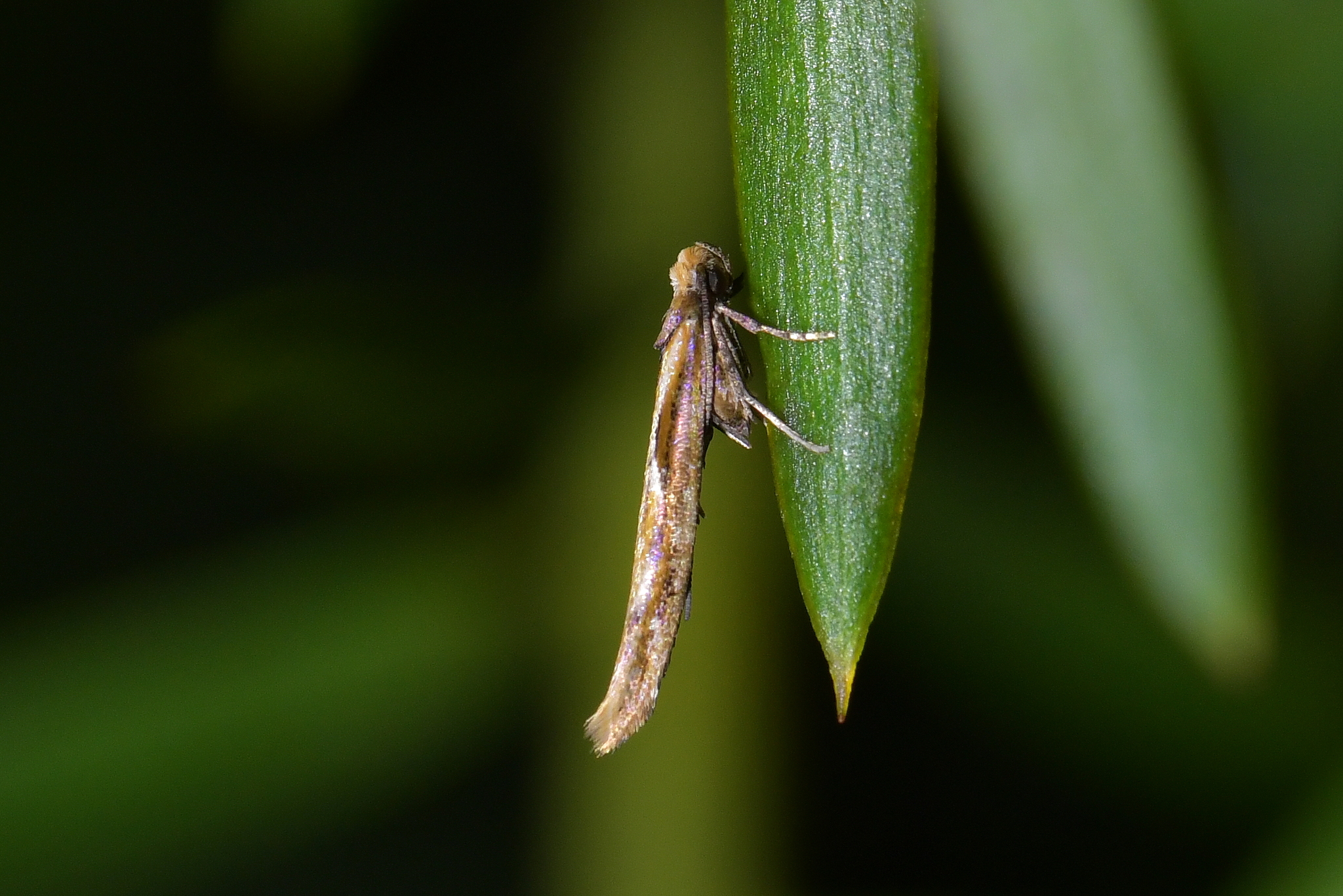

This species is endemic to New Zealand. It has been observed in both the North and South Islands.

== Behaviour ==
This species is on the wing in November and April.
