= Zelleria memorella =

Scientific classification
- Kingdom: Animalia
- Phylum: Arthropoda
- Class: Insecta
- Order: Lepidoptera
- Family: Yponomeutidae
- Genus: Zelleria
- Species: Z. memorella

Binomial name
- Zelleria memorella Meyrick, 1893

Species of moth

Zelleria memorella is a moth of the family Yponomeutidae. It is found in Australia, including Tasmania.
