= Alfred Philpott =

New Zealand museum curator, entomologist, writer and milk factory worker

Alfred Philpott (15 December 1870 – 24 July 1930) was a New Zealand museum curator, entomologist and writer. He was born in Tysoe, Warwickshire, England, on 15 December 1870. He became the first person to describe Zelleria maculata in 1930.
