= Anoista =

Scientific classification
- Kingdom: Animalia
- Phylum: Arthropoda
- Clade: Pancrustacea
- Class: Insecta
- Order: Lepidoptera
- Family: Yponomeutidae
- Genus: Anoista
- Species: A. insolita

Binomial name
- Anoista insolita Turner, 1939

Genus of moths

Anoista is a genus of moths of the family Yponomeutidae. They typically appear near Australia. It contains one species Anoista insolita.

== Bibliografia ==
- Gaedike R. (1969). Contribution for the knowledge of the Acrolepiidae Fauna of the Balkan Peninsula.
- Carter, D. (1984). Pest Lepidoptera of Europe. Dr. W. Junk Publishers, Boston.
