= Zelleria stylograpta =

Scientific classification
- Kingdom: Animalia
- Phylum: Arthropoda
- Class: Insecta
- Order: Lepidoptera
- Family: Yponomeutidae
- Genus: Zelleria
- Species: Z. stylograpta

Binomial name
- Zelleria stylograpta Meyrick, 1907

Species of moth

Zelleria stylograpta is a moth of the family Yponomeutidae. It is found in Australia.
