= Orsocoma =

Scientific classification
- Kingdom: Animalia
- Phylum: Arthropoda
- Clade: Pancrustacea
- Class: Insecta
- Order: Lepidoptera
- Family: Yponomeutidae
- Genus: Orsocoma
- Species: O. macrogona

Binomial name
- Orsocoma macrogona Meyrick, 1921

Genus of moths

Orsocoma is a genus of moths of the family Yponomeutidae found in Australia. It contains one species Orsocoma macrogona.
