= Zelleria aphrospora =

Scientific classification
- Kingdom: Animalia
- Phylum: Arthropoda
- Class: Insecta
- Order: Lepidoptera
- Family: Yponomeutidae
- Genus: Zelleria
- Species: Z. aphrospora

Binomial name
- Zelleria aphrospora Meyrick, 1893

Species of moth

Zelleria aphrospora is a moth of the family Yponomeutidae. It is found in Australia.
