= Lissochroa =

Scientific classification
- Kingdom: Animalia
- Phylum: Arthropoda
- Class: Insecta
- Order: Lepidoptera
- Family: Yponomeutidae
- Genus: Lissochroa
- Species: L. argostola

Binomial name
- Lissochroa argostola Turner, 1923

Genus of moths

Lissochroa is a genus of moths of the family Yponomeutidae found in Australia. It's a monotypic genus containing only the species Lissochroa argostola.
