= Amblyzancla =

Scientific classification
- Kingdom: Animalia
- Phylum: Arthropoda
- Class: Insecta
- Order: Lepidoptera
- Family: Yponomeutidae
- Genus: Amblyzancla
- Species: A. araeoptila

Binomial name
- Amblyzancla araeoptila Turner, 1939

Genus of moths

Amblyzancla is a genus of moths of the family Yponomeutidae found in Australia. It contains only one species Amblyzancla araeoptila.
