= Zelleria malacodes =

Scientific classification
- Kingdom: Animalia
- Phylum: Arthropoda
- Class: Insecta
- Order: Lepidoptera
- Family: Yponomeutidae
- Genus: Zelleria
- Species: Z. malacodes

Binomial name
- Zelleria malacodes Turner, 1939

Species of moth

Zelleria malacodes is a moth of the family Yponomeutidae. It is found in Australia, including Tasmania.
