= Zelleria isopyrrha =

Scientific classification
- Kingdom: Animalia
- Phylum: Arthropoda
- Class: Insecta
- Order: Lepidoptera
- Family: Yponomeutidae
- Genus: Zelleria
- Species: Z. isopyrrha

Binomial name
- Zelleria isopyrrha Meyrick, 1921

Species of moth

Zelleria isopyrrha is a moth of the family Yponomeutidae. It is found in Australia, from Busselton to Albany in Western Australia.
