= Diathryptica euryphracta =

Scientific classification
- Kingdom: Animalia
- Phylum: Arthropoda
- Clade: Pancrustacea
- Class: Insecta
- Order: Lepidoptera
- Family: Plutellidae
- Genus: Diathryptica
- Species: D. euryphracta

Binomial name
- Diathryptica euryphracta (Meyrick, 1893)

Synonyms
- Eriocottis euryphracta Meyrick, 1893

Species of moth

Diathryptica euryphracta is a moth of the family Plutellidae. It is found in Australia.
