= Zelleria cremnospila =

Scientific classification
- Domain: Eukaryota
- Kingdom: Animalia
- Phylum: Arthropoda
- Class: Insecta
- Order: Lepidoptera
- Family: Yponomeutidae
- Genus: Zelleria
- Species: Z. cremnospila

Binomial name
- Zelleria cremnospila Lower, 1900

Species of moth

Zelleria cremnospila is a moth of the family Yponomeutidae. It was described by Oswald Bertram Lower in 1900 and is found in Australia.

The wingspan is about 10 mm. The forewings are pale slaty-grey whitish, with scattered black scales and a larger black spot above the anal angle. The hindwings are greyish.
