= Zelleria hemixipha =

Scientific classification
- Domain: Eukaryota
- Kingdom: Animalia
- Phylum: Arthropoda
- Class: Insecta
- Order: Lepidoptera
- Family: Yponomeutidae
- Genus: Zelleria
- Species: Z. hemixipha

Binomial name
- Zelleria hemixipha Lower, 1900

Species of moth

Zelleria hemixipha is a moth of the family Yponomeutidae. It is found in Australia.
