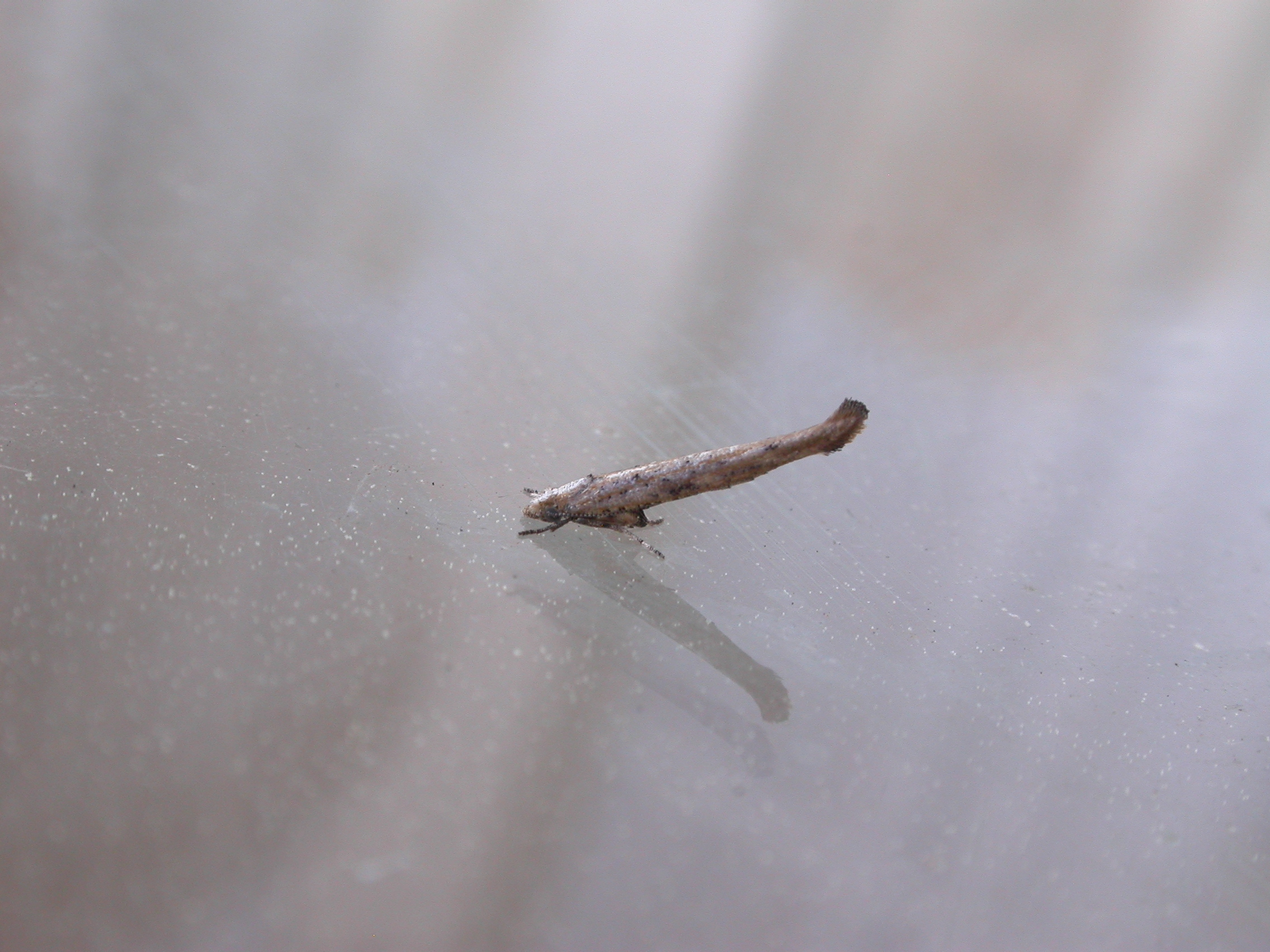

Scientific classification
- Domain: Eukaryota
- Kingdom: Animalia
- Phylum: Arthropoda
- Class: Insecta
- Order: Lepidoptera
- Family: Yponomeutidae
- Genus: Zelleria
- Species: Z. cynetica

Binomial name
- Zelleria cynetica Meyrick, 1893

= Zelleria cynetica =

Species of moth

Zelleria cynetica is a species of moth in the family Yponomeutidae. It was first described by Edward Meyrick in 1893 and can be found in the Australian states of New South Wales, Queensland, and Tasmania.
