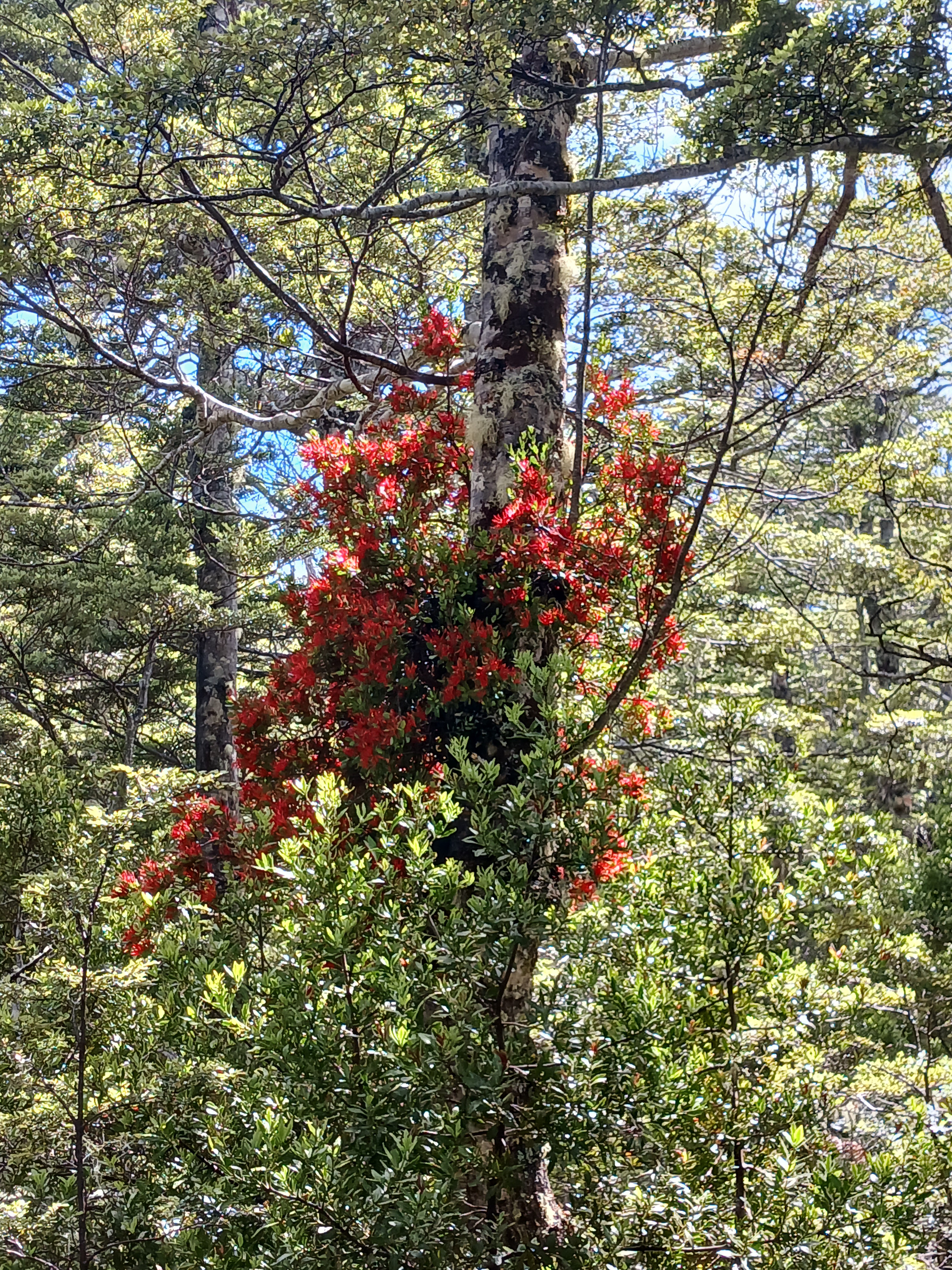

Conservation status
- Gradual Decline (NZ TCS)

Scientific classification
- Kingdom: Plantae
- Clade: Tracheophytes
- Clade: Angiosperms
- Clade: Eudicots
- Order: Santalales
- Family: Loranthaceae
- Genus: Peraxilla
- Species: P. tetrapetala

Binomial name
- Peraxilla tetrapetala (L.f.) Tiegh.

= Peraxilla tetrapetala =

Species of mistletoe

Peraxilla tetrapetala, commonly known as red mistletoe, is a parasitic plant in the family Loranthaceae, endemic to New Zealand and found on both the North and South Islands. The Māori names for the plant are pikirangi, pirirangi and roeroe. It is a shrub up to one metre tall with glabrous leaves. The flowers are 4–5 mm long, bright red to orange in colour which split open to the base.

P. tetrapetala is an obligate stem hemiparasite, meaning that it can only complete its lifecycle by growing on stems of a host species and drawing moisture and nutrients from the host, but that it also produces its own food through photosynthesis with its evergreen leaves. Red mistletoe mainly parasitises Quintinia and Nothofagus species. Its principal host is the black/mountain beech (Nothofagus solandri complex). However, north of latitude 38°S this species utilises tawheowheo (Quintinia serrata), and in the far north has been found on pōhutukawa (Metrosideros excelsa), pūriri (Vitex lucens) and tōwai (Weinmannia sylvicola), and hence, is the most widely distributed beech mistletoe.

P. tetrapetala is hermaphroditic, self-compatible, and is both bird-pollinated and bird-dispersed, yet has an explosive bud-opening mechanism. It is thought that birds are more important for seed dispersal than for pollination.

Leaves

The caterpillar of the endemic moth Zelleria maculata feeds on the inside flower buds of P. tetrapetala and as a result can affect the production of seeds of this plant.

== Conservation ==
The plant is highly palatable to the introduced common brushtail possum resulting in a threat to the plant population. The possum browsing effect appears more important in the North Island than in the South Island, where the major cause of foliage browse has been attributed to insect attack. A continued major threat is habitat loss.

Red mistletoe is listed as in "Gradual Decline" in the New Zealand Threat Classification System and relies on conservation measures to halt the decline.

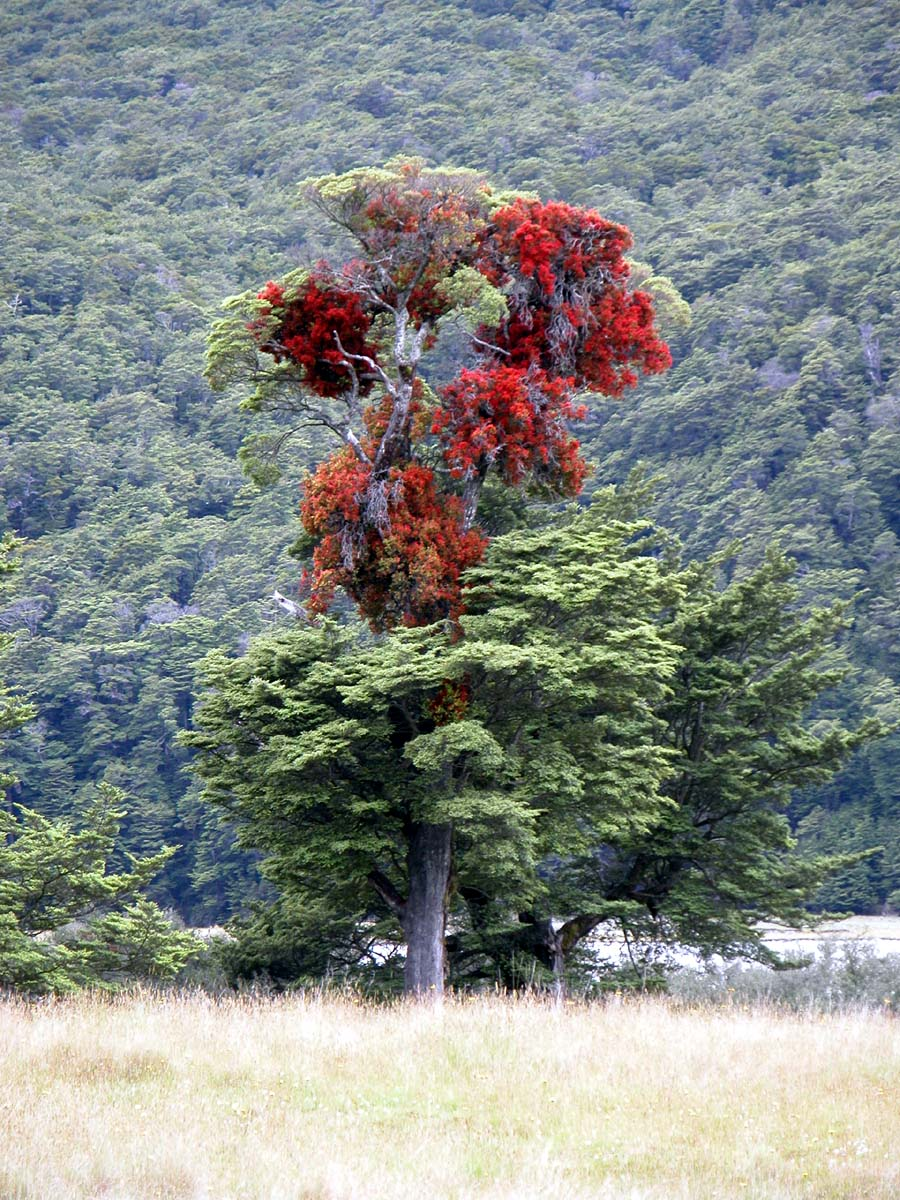
Red mistletoe, Hopkins River, South Island
