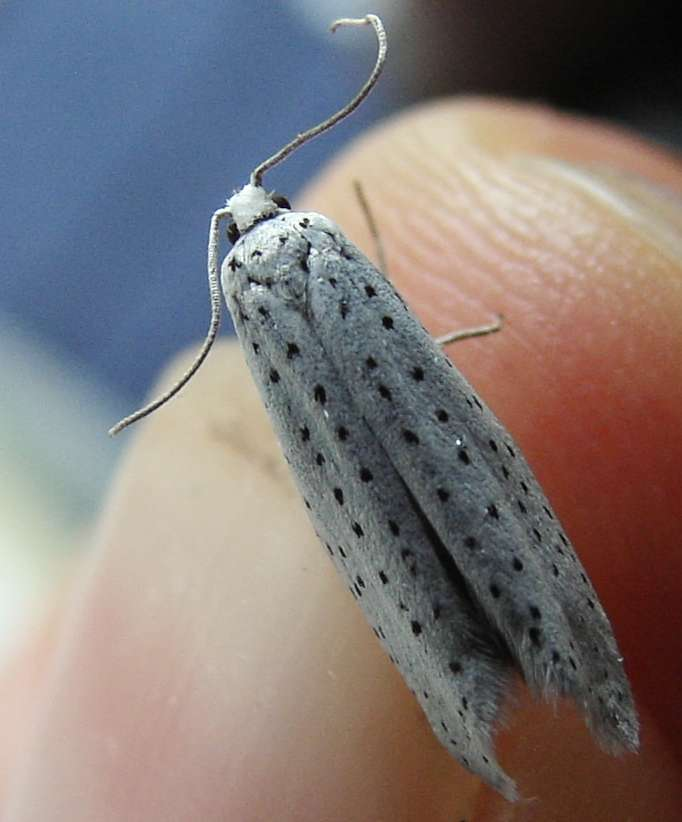
- Unidentified Yponomeuta species

Scientific classification
- Kingdom: Animalia
- Phylum: Arthropoda
- Clade: Pancrustacea
- Class: Insecta
- Order: Lepidoptera
- Family: Yponomeutidae
- Subfamily: Yponomeutinae

Genera
- See text

= Yponomeutinae =

Subfamily of moths

Yponomeutinae is a subfamily of "micromoths" in the lepidopteran family Yponomeutidae (ermine moths). As their scientific name implies, this is the subfamily containing the type genus of the ermine moths, Yponomeuta. The subfamily has worldwide distribution.

A few species usually separated as subfamily Scythropiinae are sometimes placed here too.

== Selected genera ==
This list mostly based on M. Savela's pages which includes various sources and Fauna Europaea. All names except those with additional references are listed on both.

- Anoista
- Banghaasia
- Cedestis
- Charicrita
- Chionogenes
- Eftichia J.F.G.Clarke, 1986
- Euhyponomeuta
- Euhyponomeutoides
- Kessleria
- Lissochroa
- Litaneutis
- Niphonympha
- Nymphonia
- Ocnerostoma
- Opsiclines
- Orsocoma
- Palleura
- Paradoxus
- Parahyponomeuta
- Paraswammerdamia
- Pseudoswammerdamia
- Pseudotalara
- Syncrotaulella
- Spaniophylla
- Steganosticha
- Stryphnaula
- Swammerdamia
- Sympetalistis
- Teinoptila
- Terthroptera
- Trochastica
- Trychnomera
- Xyrosaris
- Yponomeuta
- Zelleria
- Zygographa
