= Sporadarchis =

Scientific classification
- Kingdom: Animalia
- Phylum: Arthropoda
- Class: Insecta
- Order: Lepidoptera
- Family: Yponomeutidae
- Genus: Sporadarchis

Species
- See text

Genus of moths

Sporadarchis is a genus of moths of the family Yponomeutidae.

== Species ==
- Sporadarchis galactombra - Meyrick, 1935
