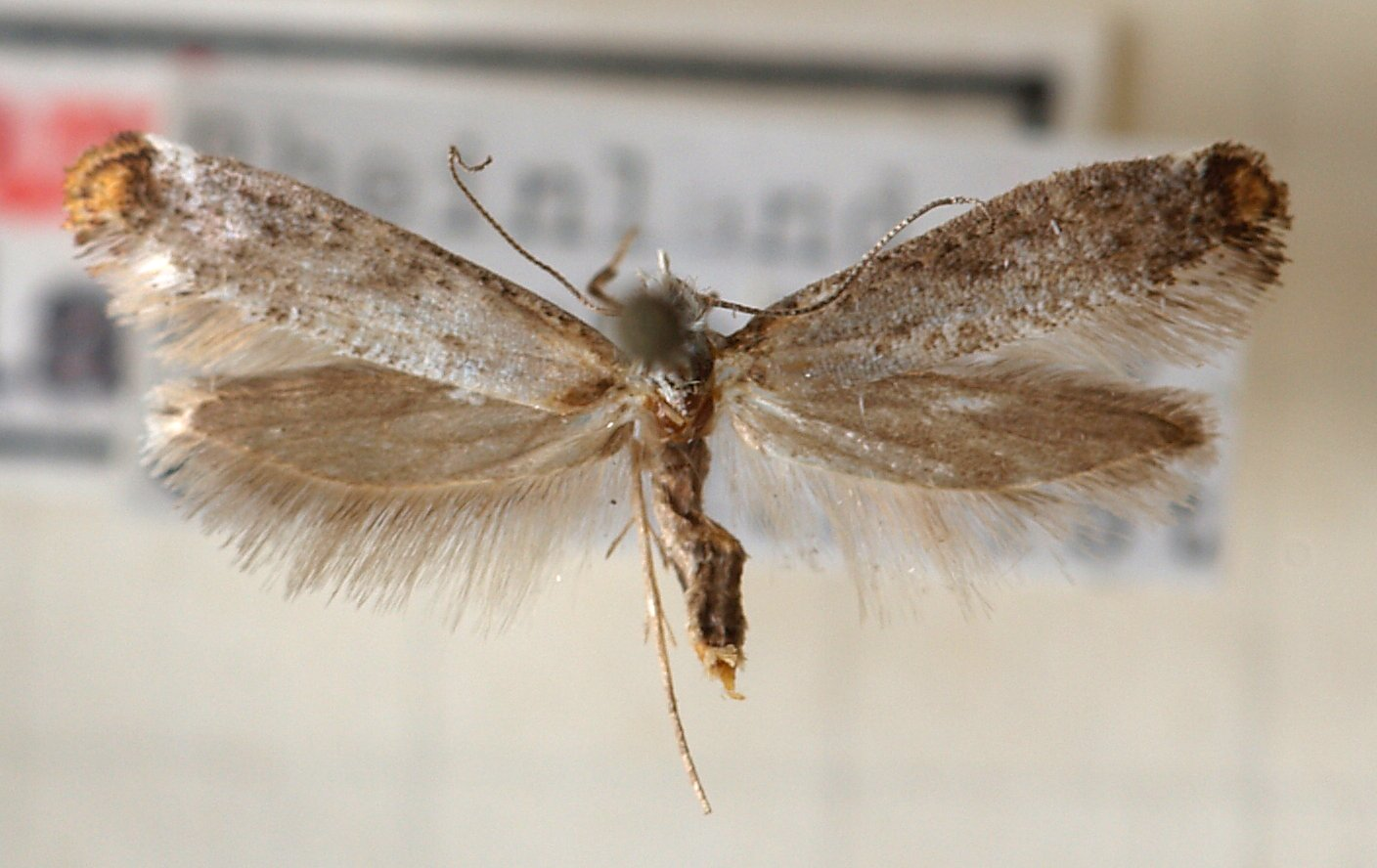
- Pseudoswammerdamia combinella

Scientific classification
- Domain: Eukaryota
- Kingdom: Animalia
- Phylum: Arthropoda
- Class: Insecta
- Order: Lepidoptera
- Family: Yponomeutidae
- Subfamily: Yponomeutinae
- Genus: Pseudoswammerdamia; Friese, 1960

Species
- See text

= Pseudoswammerdamia =

Genus of moths

Pseudoswammerdamia is a genus of moths of the family Yponomeutidae.

== Species ==
- Pseudoswammerdamia apicella - Donovan, 1792
- Pseudoswammerdamia aurofinitella - Duponchel, 1842
- Pseudoswammerdamia combinella - Hübner, 1786
- Pseudoswammerdamia comptella - Hübner, 1796
