= Chionogenes =

Scientific classification
- Kingdom: Animalia
- Phylum: Arthropoda
- Class: Insecta
- Order: Lepidoptera
- Family: Yponomeutidae
- Subfamily: Yponomeutinae
- Genus: Chionogenes; Meyrick, 1913

Species
- See text

Genus of moths

Chionogenes is a genus of moths of the family Yponomeutidae. It is found in Australia.

== Species ==
- Chionogenes drosochlora - Meyrick, 1907
- Chionogenes isanema - Meyrick, 1907
- Chionogenes trimetra - Meyrick, 1913
