= Cedestis =

Scientific classification
- Kingdom: Animalia
- Phylum: Arthropoda
- Clade: Pancrustacea
- Class: Insecta
- Order: Lepidoptera
- Family: Yponomeutidae
- Subfamily: Yponomeutinae
- Genus: Cedestis; Zeller, 1839

Species
- See text

Synonyms
- Dyscedestis Spuler, 1910; Eucedestis Palct, 1951

Genus of moths

Cedestis is a genus of moths of the family Yponomeutidae.

== Species ==
- Cedestis civitatensis - Nel & Varenne, 2015
- Cedestis exiguata - Moriuti, 1977
- Cedestis granadensis - Tokár, Graf & Huemer, 2024
- Cedestis gysseleniella - Zeller, 1839
- Cedestis leucopterostigmatis - J.C. Sohn & C.S. Wu, 2010
- Cedestis subfasciella - Stephens, (syn: Cedestis farinatella Zeller, 1839 )
