= Swammerdamia passerella =

Scientific classification
- Kingdom: Animalia
- Phylum: Arthropoda
- Clade: Pancrustacea
- Class: Insecta
- Order: Lepidoptera
- Family: Yponomeutidae
- Genus: Swammerdamia
- Species: S. passerella

Binomial name
- Swammerdamia passerella (Zetterstedt, 1839)

Synonyms
- Oecophora passerella Zetterstedt, 1839; Swammerdamia variegata Tengström, 1869; Swammerdamia nanivora Stainton, 1871

Species of moth

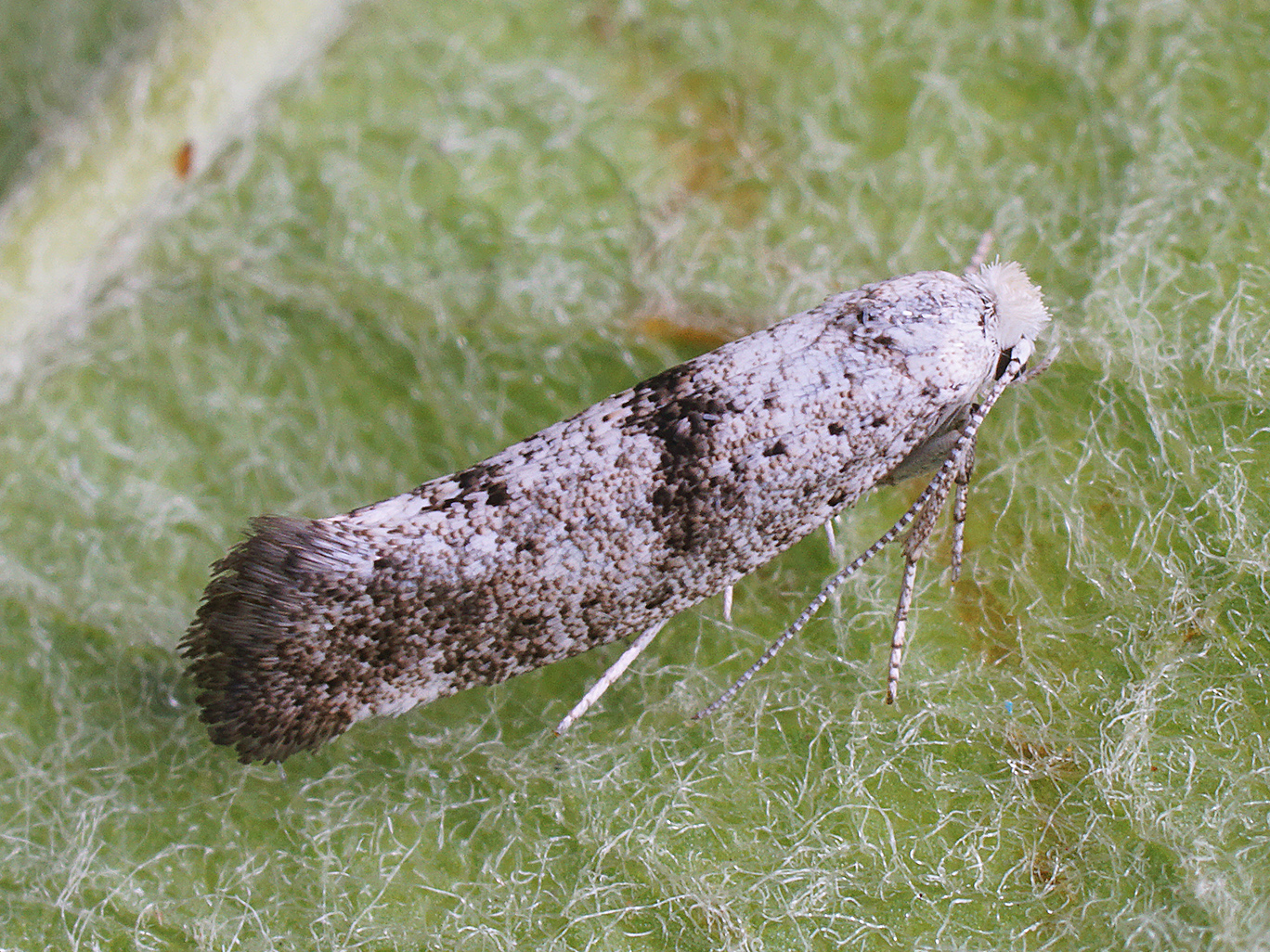

Swammerdamia passerella is a moth of the family Yponomeutidae. It is found in Great Britain, Fennoscandia, Poland, Estonia and northern Russia.

The wingspan is 10–12 mm. Adults are on wing from June to July.

The larvae feed on Betula nana. Mining larvae can be found in June.
