= Euhyponomeutoides ribesiella =

Scientific classification
- Domain: Eukaryota
- Kingdom: Animalia
- Phylum: Arthropoda
- Class: Insecta
- Order: Lepidoptera
- Family: Yponomeutidae
- Genus: Euhyponomeutoides
- Species: E. ribesiella

Binomial name
- Euhyponomeutoides ribesiella (de Joannis, 1900)

Synonyms
- Zelleria ribesiella de Joannis, 1900; Euhyponomeutoides ribesiellus; Zelleria ribesiellus

Species of moth

Euhyponomeutoides ribesiella is a moth of the family Yponomeutidae. It is found in Fennoscandia, Germany, Poland, Estonia, Ukraine, Slovakia, Austria, Belgium and France.

The wingspan is 16–19 mm. Adults are on wing from late April to September.

The larvae feed on Ribes alpinum and Ribes uva-crispa. They mine the leaves of their host plant. Larvae can be found from May to July.
