= Charicrita sericoleuca =

Scientific classification
- Domain: Eukaryota
- Kingdom: Animalia
- Phylum: Arthropoda
- Class: Insecta
- Order: Lepidoptera
- Family: Yponomeutidae
- Genus: Charicrita
- Species: C. sericoleuca

Binomial name
- Charicrita sericoleuca Turner, 1923

Species of moth

Charicrita sericoleuca is a moth of the family Yponomeutidae. It is found in Australia.
