= Xyrosaris =

Scientific classification
- Kingdom: Animalia
- Phylum: Arthropoda
- Class: Insecta
- Order: Lepidoptera
- Family: Yponomeutidae
- Subfamily: Yponomeutinae
- Genus: Xyrosaris; Meyrick, 1907

Type species
- Xyrosaris dryopa Meyrick, 1907

Species
- See text

Genus of moths

Xyrosaris is a genus of moths of the family Yponomeutidae.

This genus is allied to Zelleria but distinct by the long antennae, peculiar palpi and scale-tufts of forewings.

== Species ==
- Xyrosaris acroxutha - Turner, 1923 (from Australia)
- Xyrosaris campsiptila - Meyrick, (from Sri Lanka)
- Xyrosaris celastrella - Kearfott, 1903
- Xyrosaris dryopa - Meyrick, 1907 (from Australia)
- Xyrosaris lichneuta - Meyrick, 1918 (China, Japan, Korea, Russia)
- Xyrosaris lirinopa - Meyrick, 1922 (from China)
- Xyrosaris maligna - Meyrick, 1907 (from India/Sri Lanka)
- Xyrosaris melanopsamma - Meyrick, 1931 (from Japan)
- Xyrosaris mnesicentra - Meyrick, 1913 (from British Guyana)
- Xyrosaris obtorta - Meyrick, 1924
- Xyrosaris ochroplagiata - Braun, 1918 (from N.America)
- Xyrosaris secreta - Meyrick, 1912 (from South Africa)
