= Steganosticha =

Scientific classification
- Kingdom: Animalia
- Phylum: Arthropoda
- Class: Insecta
- Order: Lepidoptera
- Family: Yponomeutidae
- Subfamily: Yponomeutinae
- Genus: Steganosticha

Species
- See text

Genus of moths

Steganosticha is a genus of moths of the family Yponomeutidae.

== Species ==
- Steganosticha remigera - Meyrick, 1921
