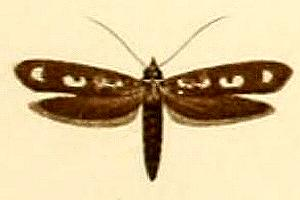

Scientific classification
- Kingdom: Animalia
- Phylum: Arthropoda
- Class: Insecta
- Order: Lepidoptera
- Family: Yponomeutidae
- Genus: Teinoptila
- Species: T. interruptella

Binomial name
- Teinoptila interruptella Sauber, 1902

= Teinoptila interruptella =

Species of moth

Teinoptila interruptella is a moth of the family Yponomeutidae. It is found in Southeast Asia, including the Philippines and Queensland, Australia.
