= Teinoptila antistatica =

Scientific classification
- Kingdom: Animalia
- Phylum: Arthropoda
- Class: Insecta
- Order: Lepidoptera
- Family: Yponomeutidae
- Genus: Teinoptila
- Species: T. antistatica

Binomial name
- Teinoptila antistatica (Meyrick, 1931)

Synonyms
- Hyponomeuta antistatica Meyrick, 1931; Yponomeuta antistatica

Species of moth

Teinoptila antistatica is a moth of the family Yponomeutidae. It is found in Guizhou, China, and on Java.

The wingspan is 22–26 mm.

The larvae feed on Euonymus japonicus and Maytenus hookeri. They feed concealed within a few leaves connected with webbing, and they overwinter in this stage.
