= Teinoptila ingens =

Scientific classification
- Kingdom: Animalia
- Phylum: Arthropoda
- Class: Insecta
- Order: Lepidoptera
- Family: Yponomeutidae
- Genus: Teinoptila
- Species: T. ingens

Binomial name
- Teinoptila ingens Gershenson & Ulenberg 1998

Species of moth

Teinoptila ingens is a moth of the family Yponomeutidae. It is found in Burundi.
