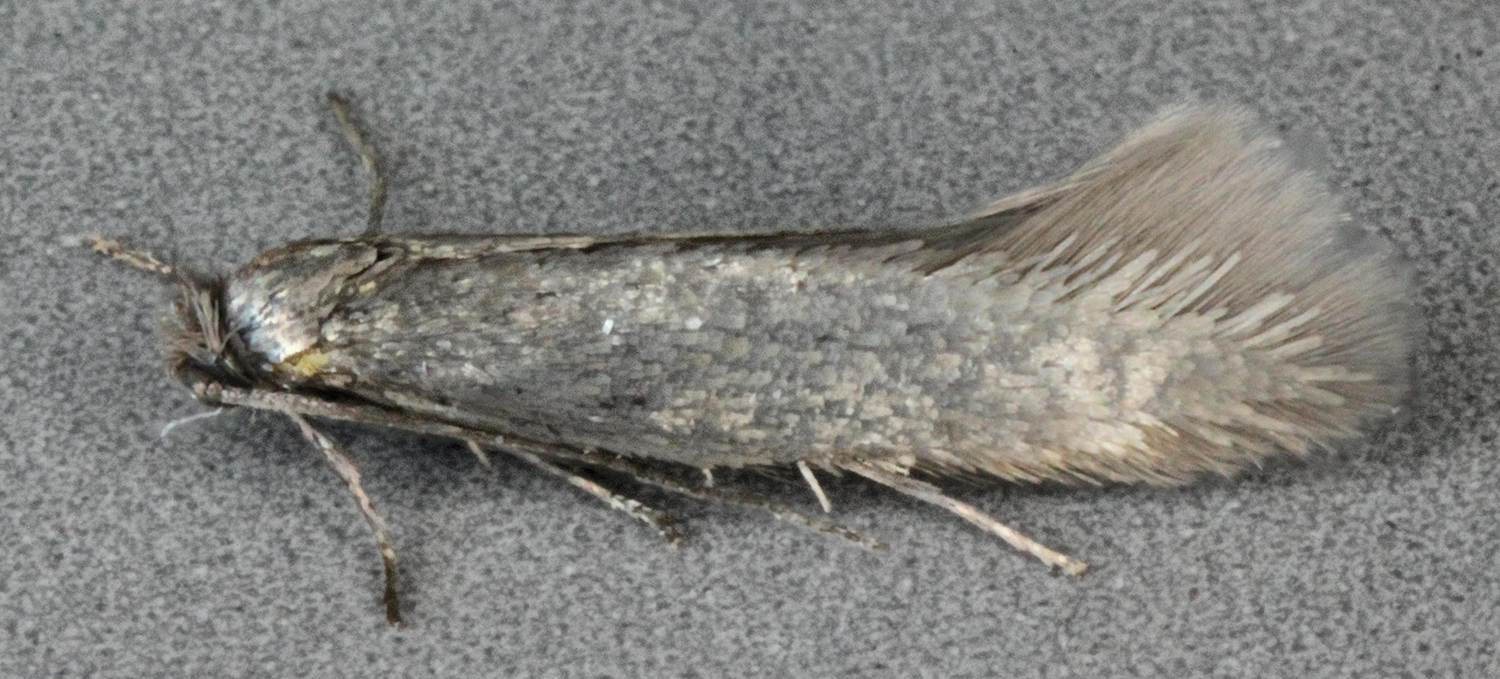

Scientific classification
- Domain: Eukaryota
- Kingdom: Animalia
- Phylum: Arthropoda
- Class: Insecta
- Order: Lepidoptera
- Family: Yponomeutidae
- Genus: Ocnerostoma
- Species: O. friesei

Binomial name
- Ocnerostoma friesei Svensson, 1966

= Ocnerostoma friesei =

Species of moth

Ocnerostoma friesei is a moth of the family Yponomeutidae. It is found in Europe and Japan. The species closely resembles Ocnerostoma piniariella.

The wingspan is 8–10 mm. The moth flies in two generations from April to May and again from August to October..

The larvae feed on Scots pine.

== Notes ==
1. The flight season refers to Belgium and The Netherlands. This may vary in other parts of the range.
