= Nymphonia =

Scientific classification
- Kingdom: Animalia
- Phylum: Arthropoda
- Class: Insecta
- Order: Lepidoptera
- Family: Yponomeutidae
- Subfamily: Yponomeutinae
- Genus: Nymphonia; Meyrick, 1913

Species
- See text

Genus of moths

Nymphonia is a genus of moths of the family Yponomeutidae.

== Species ==
- Nymphonia zaleuca - Meyrick, 1913
