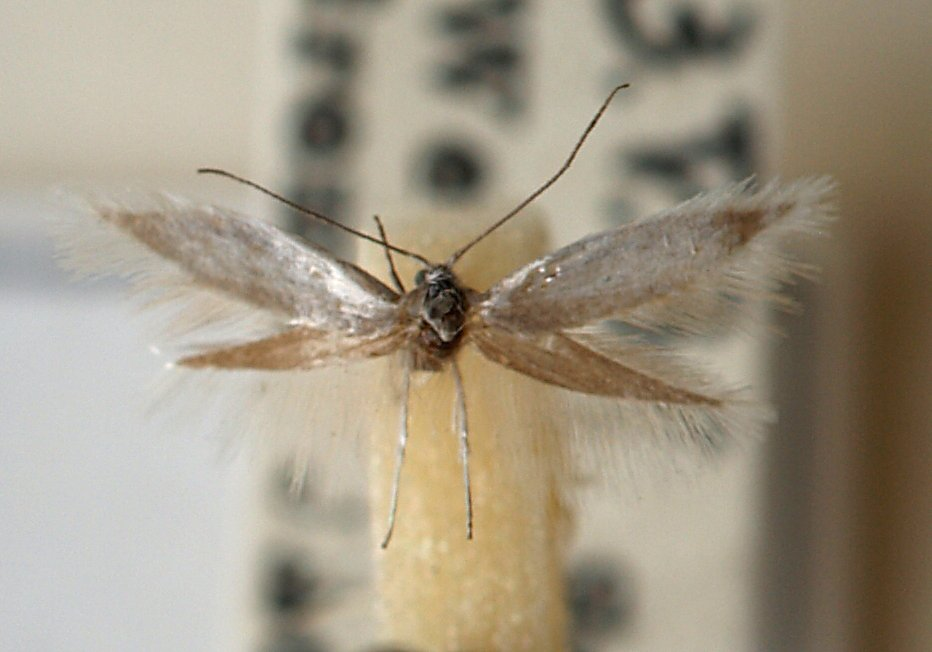

Scientific classification
- Kingdom: Animalia
- Phylum: Arthropoda
- Clade: Pancrustacea
- Class: Insecta
- Order: Lepidoptera
- Family: Yponomeutidae
- Genus: Ocnerostoma
- Species: O. piniariella

Binomial name
- Ocnerostoma piniariella Zeller, 1847

= Ocnerostoma piniariella =

Species of moth

Ocnerostoma piniariella is a moth of the family Yponomeutidae. It is found in Europe. The species closely resembles Ocnerostoma friesei.

The wingspan is c. 9 mm. The lanceolate forewings are shining light grey. Hindwings are grey. The larva is shining brown; head and plate of 2 black.

The moth flies in one generation from June to August..

The larvae feed on Scots pine.

== Notes ==
1. The flight season refers to Belgium and The Netherlands. This may vary in other parts of the range.
