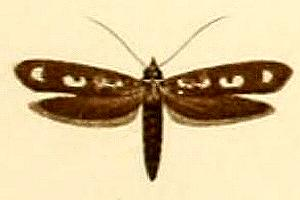
- Teinoptila interruptella

Scientific classification
- Kingdom: Animalia
- Phylum: Arthropoda
- Clade: Pancrustacea
- Class: Insecta
- Order: Lepidoptera
- Family: Yponomeutidae
- Subfamily: Yponomeutinae
- Genus: Teinoptila; Sauber, 1902

Species
- See text

Synonyms
- Choutinea Huang, 1982

= Teinoptila =

Genus of moths

Teinoptila is a genus of moths of the family Yponomeutidae.

== Species ==
- Teinoptila antistatica - (Meyrick, 1931)
- Teinoptila bolidias - (Meyrick, 1913)
- Teinoptila brunnescens - (Moore, 1888)
- Teinoptila calcarata - (Meyrick 1924)
- Teinoptila clavata - Q. Jin, S.X. Wang & H.H. Li, 2009
- Teinoptila corpuscularis - (Meyrick 1907)
- Teinoptila guttella - Moriuti, 1977
- Teinoptila ingens - Gershenson & Ulenberg 1998
- Teinoptila interruptella - Sauber, 1902
- Teinoptila taprobanae - Sohn, 2021
