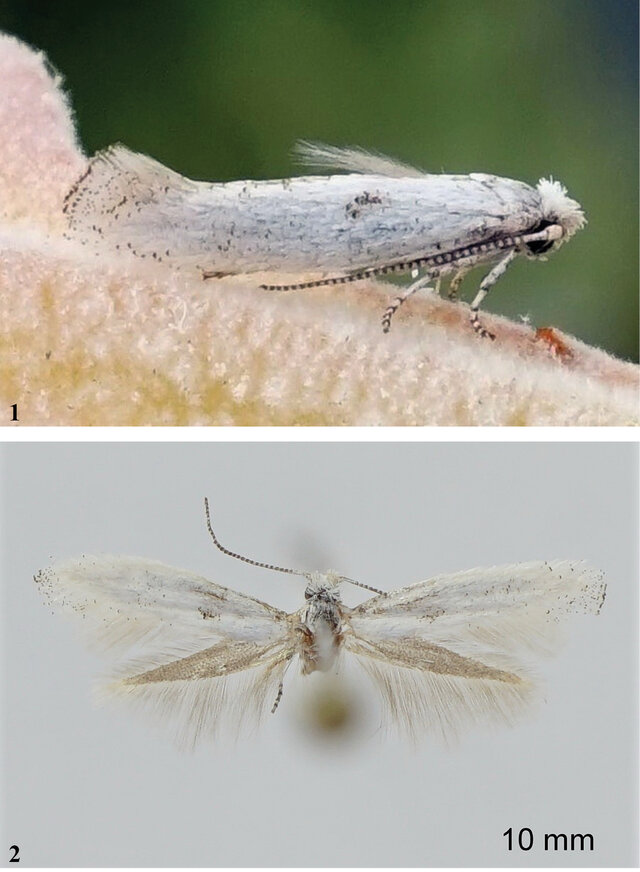

Scientific classification
- Kingdom: Animalia
- Phylum: Arthropoda
- Clade: Pancrustacea
- Class: Insecta
- Order: Lepidoptera
- Family: Yponomeutidae
- Genus: Cedestis
- Species: C. granadensis

Binomial name
- Cedestis granadensis Tokar, Graf & Huemer, 2024

= Cedestis granadensis =

Species of moth

Cedestis granadensis is a moth in the family Yponomeutidae, found in Spain. It is known only from high-altitude habitats (1400–1500 m) with larvae likely feeding on pine needles.

== Discovery ==
Cedestis granadensis was first discovered during a Lepidoptera species survey of the Spanish province of Granada in July 2010. During this time, one female Cedestis granadensis was collected near the Natural Park of Sierra de Huétor. It was initially identified as an unknown species in the family Elachistidae, but subsequent analysis of the genitalia and its genetics revealed it was part of the Yponomeutidae. There were no further records of the species until 2021, when a male was collected near Puebla de Don Fadrique. This individual would later become the holotype specimen for the species description in 2024.

== Description ==
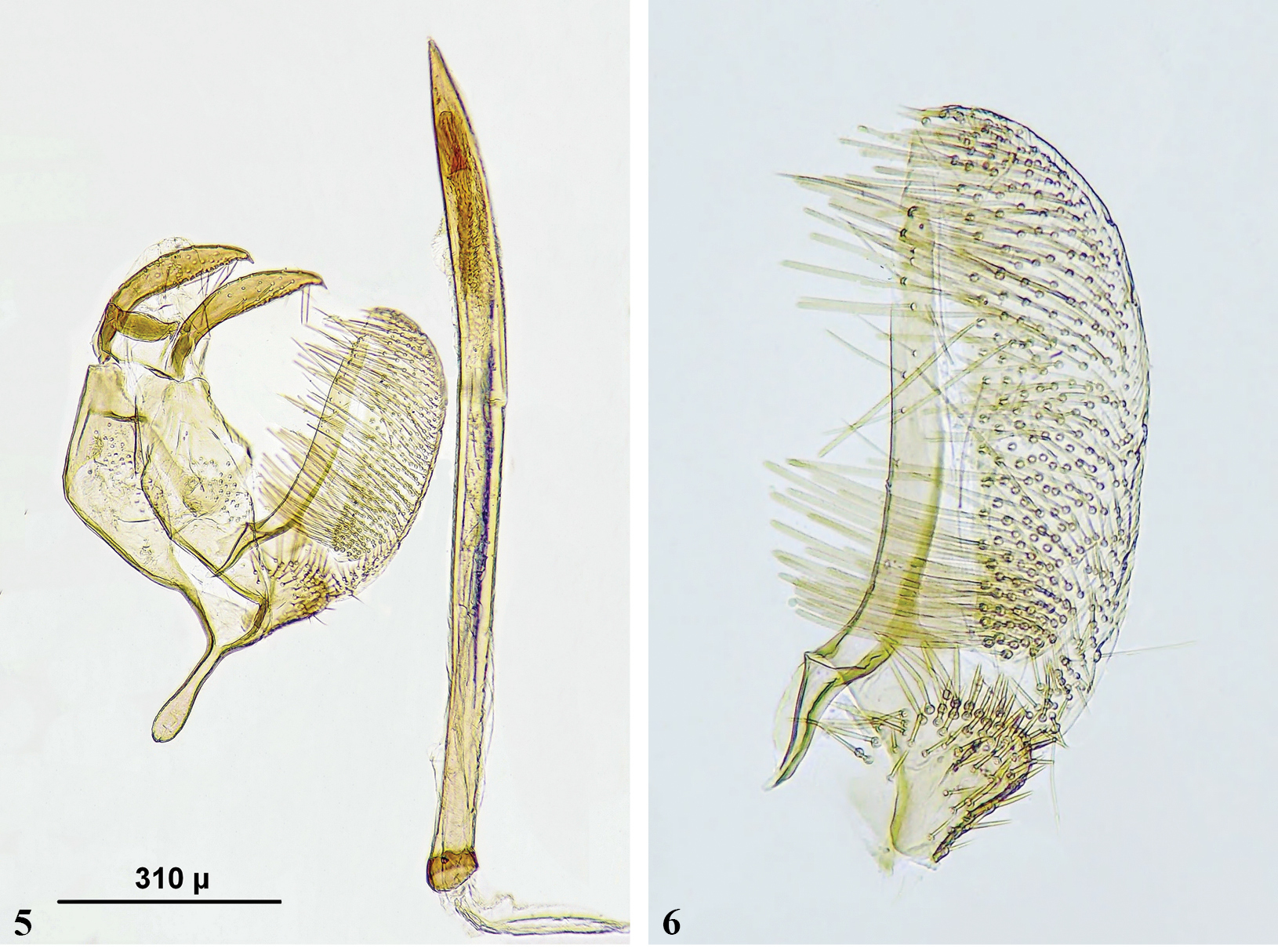
Male genitalia of Cedestis granadensis: right valva on the left, left valva on the right.

Cedestis granadensis males and females are almost identical except that forewing markings in the females are slightly less pronounced. The head is white with whitish to yellow tufts at the top, and the antennae have a whitish scape (first antennal segment) followed by alternating white and dark brown bands on the flagellum. The wings are white to creamy white, with a scattering of darker scales in the last two thirds of the wing. These are especially numerous near the end of the wings. The hindwings are light gray-brown.

The male and female genitalia of Cedestis granadensis most closely resemble the genitalia of Cedestis civitatensis, which are also supported as sister species based on DNA barcode sequences. They can be told apart by the uncus of the male genitalia in Cedestis granadensis being broad with slightly protruding and rounded lobes, in contrast to the truncated uncus of Cedestis civitatensis. For female genitalia, the two species can be told apart by Cedestis granadensis having longer apophyses posteriores and anteriores than Cedestis civitatensis.

== Biology ==
Cedestis granadensis is only known from two locations in the Spanish province of Granada, both at an altitude of 1400-1500 m. The species is known from two habitat types: rocky-steppe plateau and sparse pine forests on dolomitic sands. While the specific life history of Cedestis granadensis is unknown, other Cedestis species feed internally on pine needles of Pinaceae as caterpillars, and Cedestis granadensis may do the same.
