= Charicrita citrozona =

Scientific classification
- Kingdom: Animalia
- Phylum: Arthropoda
- Class: Insecta
- Order: Lepidoptera
- Family: Yponomeutidae
- Genus: Charicrita
- Species: C. citrozona

Binomial name
- Charicrita citrozona Meyrick, 1913

Species of moth

Charicrita citrozona is a moth of the family Yponomeutidae. It is found in Australia.
