= Terthroptera =

Scientific classification
- Kingdom: Animalia
- Phylum: Arthropoda
- Clade: Pancrustacea
- Class: Insecta
- Order: Lepidoptera
- Family: Yponomeutidae
- Subfamily: Yponomeutinae
- Genus: Terthroptera; J.F.G.Clarke, 1971

Species
- See text

Genus of moths

Terthroptera is a genus of ermine moths (family Yponomeutidae). They belong to the large subfamily Yponomeutinae.

This genus includes a mere two known species from southern Polynesia. They are small moths with wingspans less than 2 cm (1 inch), and are characterized by their 8-veined hindwings, with veins 3 and 4 separate and veins 5 and 6 unstalked.

The species are:

- Terthroptera astochia J.F.G.Clarke, 1986
- Terthroptera eremosesia J.F.G.Clarke, 1971
