= Xyrosaris dryopa =

Scientific classification
- Kingdom: Animalia
- Phylum: Arthropoda
- Class: Insecta
- Order: Lepidoptera
- Family: Yponomeutidae
- Genus: Xyrosaris
- Species: X. dryopa

Binomial name
- Xyrosaris dryopa Meyrick, 1907

Species of moth

Xyrosaris dryopa is a moth of the family Yponomeutidae. It is found in southern Australia.
