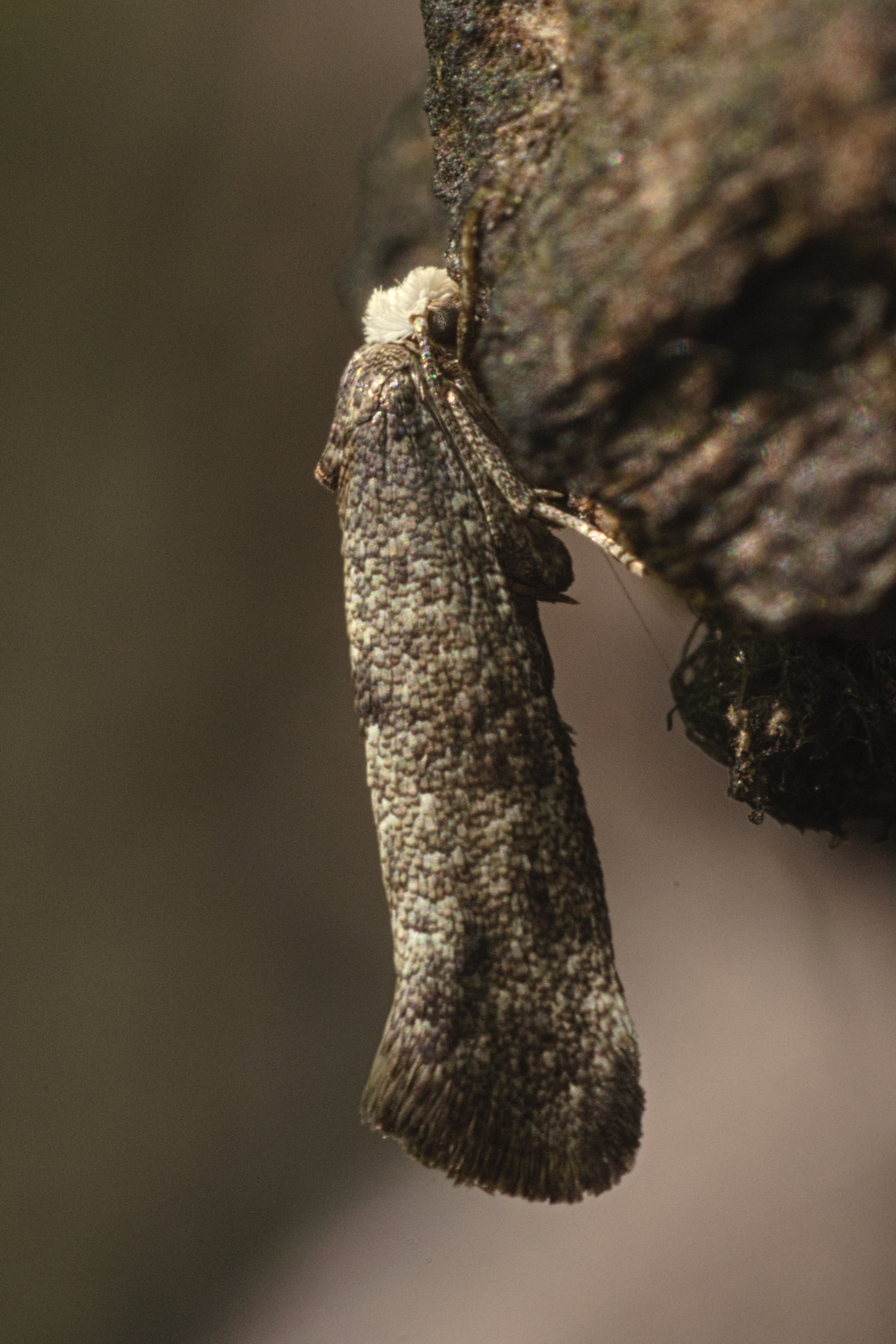

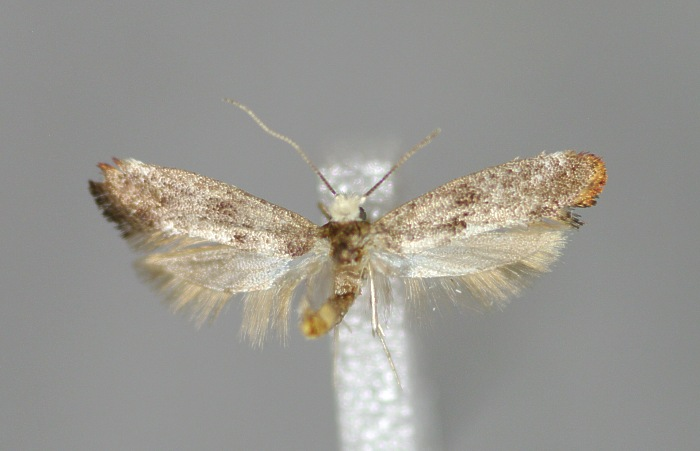

Scientific classification
- Kingdom: Animalia
- Phylum: Arthropoda
- Clade: Pancrustacea
- Class: Insecta
- Order: Lepidoptera
- Family: Yponomeutidae
- Genus: Swammerdamia
- Species: S. pyrella

Binomial name
- Swammerdamia pyrella (Villers, 1789)

Synonyms
- Phalaena pyrella Villers, 1789

= Swammerdamia pyrella =

Species of moth

Swammerdamia pyrella is a moth of the family Yponomeutidae. It is found in Europe, North America and Japan.

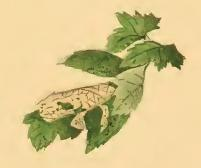
Gnawed hawthorn leaf

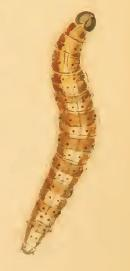
Larva

The wingspan is 10–13 mm. The head is white or whitish ochreous. Thorax is dark fuscous, whitish-sprinkled. Forewings are fuscous, faintly purplish-tinged, closely irrorated with dark fuscous, and irregularly sprinkled with whitish; a dark purplish fuscous entire fascia before middle; a whitish anteapical costal spot; cilia dark coppery - fuscous. Hindwings are grey. The larva is pale yellow; subdorsal line dark red-brown; 4-12 with pale brown anterior bands; head brown, sides blackish.

The moth flies in two generations from late April to August..

The larvae feed on Crataegus, apple, pear and cherry.

== Notes ==
1. The flight season refers to Belgium and the Netherlands. This may vary in other parts of the range.
