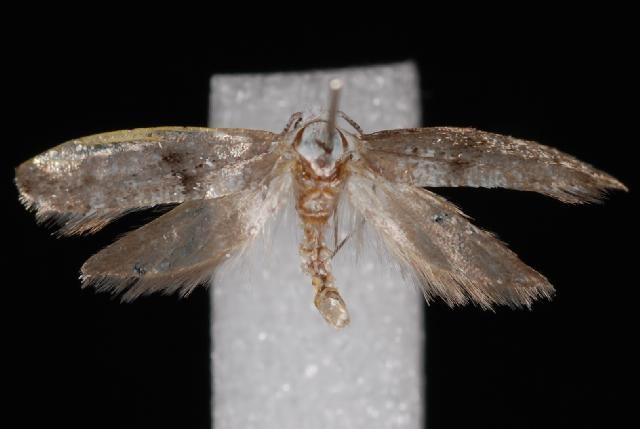
- Swammerdamia caesiella

Scientific classification
- Kingdom: Animalia
- Phylum: Arthropoda
- Clade: Pancrustacea
- Class: Insecta
- Order: Lepidoptera
- Family: Yponomeutidae
- Subfamily: Yponomeutinae
- Genus: Swammerdamia; Hübner, [1825]

Species
- See text

= Swammerdamia =

Genus of moths

Swammerdamia is a genus of moths of the family Yponomeutidae.

== Species ==
- Swammerdamia aulosema - Meyrick, 1932
- Swammerdamia beirnei - Doganlar, 1979
- Swammerdamia caesiella - Hübner, 1796
- Swammerdamia castaneae - Busck, 1914
- Swammerdamia cerasiella - Hübner, 1816
- Swammerdamia compunctella - Herrich-Schäffer, 1855
- Swammerdamia cuprescens - Braun, 1918
- Swammerdamia maculatella - Turati, 1930
- Swammerdamia moensis - Strand, 1920
- Swammerdamia passerella - Zett.
- Swammerdamia pyrella - de Villers, 1789
- Swammerdamia tobii Agassiz, 2019 (from South Africa)
- Swammerdamia villiersi Gibeaux, 1984 (from Madagascar)
