= Opsiclines =

Scientific classification
- Kingdom: Animalia
- Phylum: Arthropoda
- Clade: Pancrustacea
- Class: Insecta
- Order: Lepidoptera
- Family: Yponomeutidae
- Subfamily: Yponomeutinae
- Genus: Opsiclines; Meyrick, 1907

Type species
- Zelleria leucomorpha Lower, 1900

Genus of insects

Opsiclines is a genus of moths of the family Yponomeutidae found in South Australia. It contains only one species, Opsiclines leucomorpha.
