= Stasiphron =

Scientific classification
- Kingdom: Animalia
- Phylum: Arthropoda
- Class: Insecta
- Order: Lepidoptera
- Family: Yponomeutidae
- Genus: Stasiphron; Meyrick, 1931

Species
- See text

Genus of moths

Stasiphron is a genus of moths of the family Yponomeutidae.

== Species ==
- Stasiphron cryptomorpha - Meyrick, 1931
