= Euhyponomeutoides albithoracellus =

Scientific classification
- Domain: Eukaryota
- Kingdom: Animalia
- Phylum: Arthropoda
- Class: Insecta
- Order: Lepidoptera
- Family: Yponomeutidae
- Genus: Euhyponomeutoides
- Species: E. albithoracellus

Binomial name
- Euhyponomeutoides albithoracellus Gaj, 1954

Synonyms
- Tinea rufella Tengstrom, 1848; Euhyponomeutoides rufella; Euhyponomeutoides rufellus

Species of moth

Euhyponomeutoides albithoracellus, the currant bud moth, is a moth of the family Yponomeutidae. It is found in Fennoscandia, Denmark, Germany, Poland, the Baltic region, Romania, Slovakia, Austria, Switzerland and France.

The wingspan is 12–16 mm. Adults are on wing from late June to mid-July.
