= Chionogenes trimetra =

Scientific classification
- Kingdom: Animalia
- Phylum: Arthropoda
- Class: Insecta
- Order: Lepidoptera
- Family: Yponomeutidae
- Genus: Chionogenes
- Species: C. trimetra

Binomial name
- Chionogenes trimetra Meyrick, 1913

Species of moth

Chionogenes trimetra is a moth of the family Yponomeutidae. It is found in Australia.
