= Cedestis exiguata =

Scientific classification
- Kingdom: Animalia
- Phylum: Arthropoda
- Class: Insecta
- Order: Lepidoptera
- Family: Yponomeutidae
- Genus: Cedestis
- Species: C. exiguata

Binomial name
- Cedestis exiguata Moriuti, 1977

Species of moth

Cedestis exiguata is a moth of the family Yponomeutidae. It is found in Japan.

The wingspan is about 11 mm.
