= Niphonympha oxydelta =

Scientific classification
- Kingdom: Animalia
- Phylum: Arthropoda
- Class: Insecta
- Order: Lepidoptera
- Family: Yponomeutidae
- Genus: Niphonympha
- Species: N. oxydelta

Binomial name
- Niphonympha oxydelta (Meyrick, 1913)

Synonyms
- Calantica oxydelta Meyrick, 1913

Species of moth

Niphonympha oxydelta is a moth of the family Yponomeutidae. It is found in Australia and India (what was then Coorg Province, now part of Karnataka).
