= Swammerdamia compunctella =

Scientific classification
- Kingdom: Animalia
- Phylum: Arthropoda
- Class: Insecta
- Order: Lepidoptera
- Family: Yponomeutidae
- Genus: Swammerdamia
- Species: S. compunctella

Binomial name
- Swammerdamia compunctella Herrich-Schäffer, 1855

Synonyms
- Swammerdamia nebulosella

Species of moth

Swammerdamia compunctella is a moth of the family Yponomeutidae. It is found in Northern and Central Europe, as well as Southern Wales and Scotland, Dalmatia and Spain.

The wingspan is 14–15 mm. Adults are on wing from June to July depending on the location.

The larvae feed on Sorbus aucuparia and Crataegus species.
