= Xyrosaris acroxutha =

Scientific classification
- Domain: Eukaryota
- Kingdom: Animalia
- Phylum: Arthropoda
- Class: Insecta
- Order: Lepidoptera
- Family: Yponomeutidae
- Genus: Xyrosaris
- Species: X. acroxutha

Binomial name
- Xyrosaris acroxutha Turner, 1923

Species of moth

Xyrosaris acroxutha is a moth of the family Yponomeutidae. It is found in southern Australia.
