= Xyrosaris obtorta =

Scientific classification
- Kingdom: Animalia
- Phylum: Arthropoda
- Class: Insecta
- Order: Lepidoptera
- Family: Yponomeutidae
- Genus: Xyrosaris
- Species: X. obtorta

Binomial name
- Xyrosaris obtorta Meyrick, 1924

Species of moth

Xyrosaris obtorta is a moth of the family Yponomeutidae. It is known from the Rodrigues island of the Republic of Mauritius in the Indian Ocean.

== See also ==
- List of moths of Mauritius
