= Anaphantis =

Scientific classification
- Kingdom: Animalia
- Phylum: Arthropoda
- Class: Insecta
- Order: Lepidoptera
- Family: Yponomeutidae
- Subfamily: Yponomeutinae
- Genus: Anaphantis; Meyrick, 1907

Species
- See text

Genus of moths

Anaphantis is a genus of moths of the family Yponomeutidae.

== Species ==
- Anaphantis aurantiaca - Lucas, 1889
- Anaphantis aurifraga - Diakonoff, 1948
- Anaphantis isochrysa - Meyrick, 1907
- Anaphantis protona - Meyrick, 1910
- Anaphantis zonotorna - Meyrick, 1925
