= Euhyponomeuta stannella =

Scientific classification
- Domain: Eukaryota
- Kingdom: Animalia
- Phylum: Arthropoda
- Class: Insecta
- Order: Lepidoptera
- Family: Yponomeutidae
- Genus: Euhyponomeuta
- Species: E. stannella

Binomial name
- Euhyponomeuta stannella (Thunberg, 1788)

Synonyms
- Tinea stannella Thunberg, 1788; Euhyponomeuta stannellus

Species of moth

Euhyponomeuta stannella is a moth of the family Yponomeutidae. It is found in most of Europe, except the Iberian Peninsula, most of the Balkan Peninsula, Ireland, the Netherlands, Belgium, the Baltic region and Denmark.

The wingspan is 14–19 mm. Adults are on wing from June to August.

The larvae feed on Sedum telephium from within a silken tube or tent.
