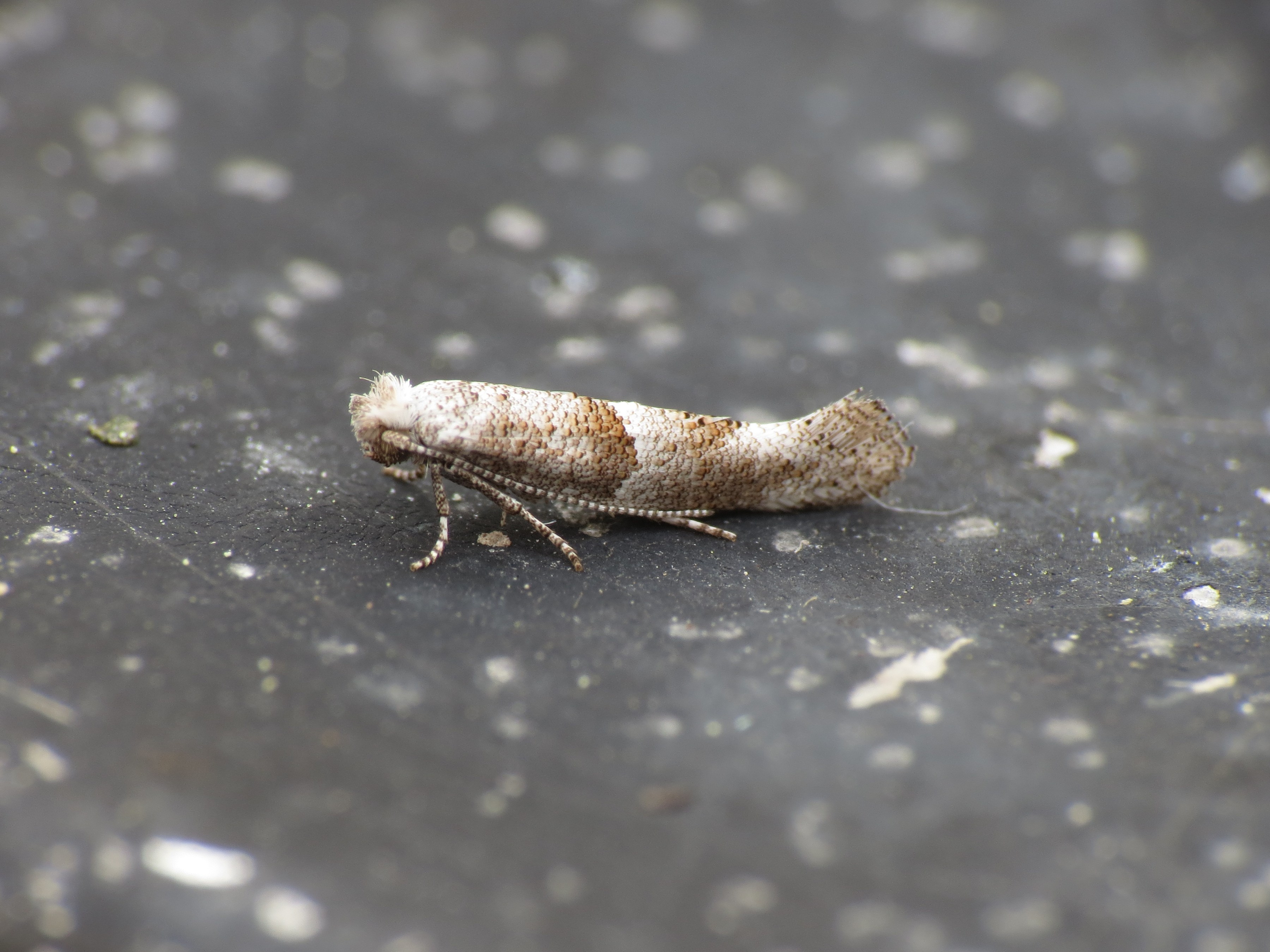

Scientific classification
- Kingdom: Animalia
- Phylum: Arthropoda
- Clade: Pancrustacea
- Class: Insecta
- Order: Lepidoptera
- Family: Yponomeutidae
- Genus: Cedestis
- Species: C. subfasciella

Binomial name
- Cedestis subfasciella (Stephens, 1834)

Synonyms
- Telea subfasciella Stephens, 1834; Argyresthia farinatella Zeller, 1839; Cedestis farinatella; Dyscedestis farinatella

= Cedestis subfasciella =

Species of moth

Cedestis subfasciella is a moth of the family Yponomeutidae. It is found in almost all of Europe, except part of the Balkan Peninsula.

The wingspan is 9–11 mm. The forewings are brown slightly reddish-tinged, towards base and apex whitish-sprinkled; a somewhat curved white fascia before middle, preceded by a darker fascia; indistinct whitish tornal and opposite costal spots; 5 and 10 absent. Hindwings are grey. The larva is pale brown, greener dorsally; head and plate of 2 black

Adults are on wing from March or April to September or October.

The larvae feed on Abies alba, Pinus mugo, Pinus nigra and Pinus sylvestris. They mine the needles of their host plant. Pupation takes place outside of the mine in a cocoon on the ground. Larvae can be found from December to March or April.
