= Euhyponomeuta =

Scientific classification
- Kingdom: Animalia
- Phylum: Arthropoda
- Clade: Pancrustacea
- Class: Insecta
- Order: Lepidoptera
- Family: Yponomeutidae
- Subfamily: Yponomeutinae
- Genus: Euhyponomeuta; Toll, 1941

Type species
- Euhyponomeuta stannella Thunberg, 1794

Species
- See text

Genus of moths

Euhyponomeuta is a genus of moths of the family Yponomeutidae.

== Species ==
- Euhyponomeuta rufimitrellus - Zeller, 1844
- Euhyponomeuta stannella - Thunberg, 1794
- Euhyponomeuta zhengi - Jin & Wang, 2011
