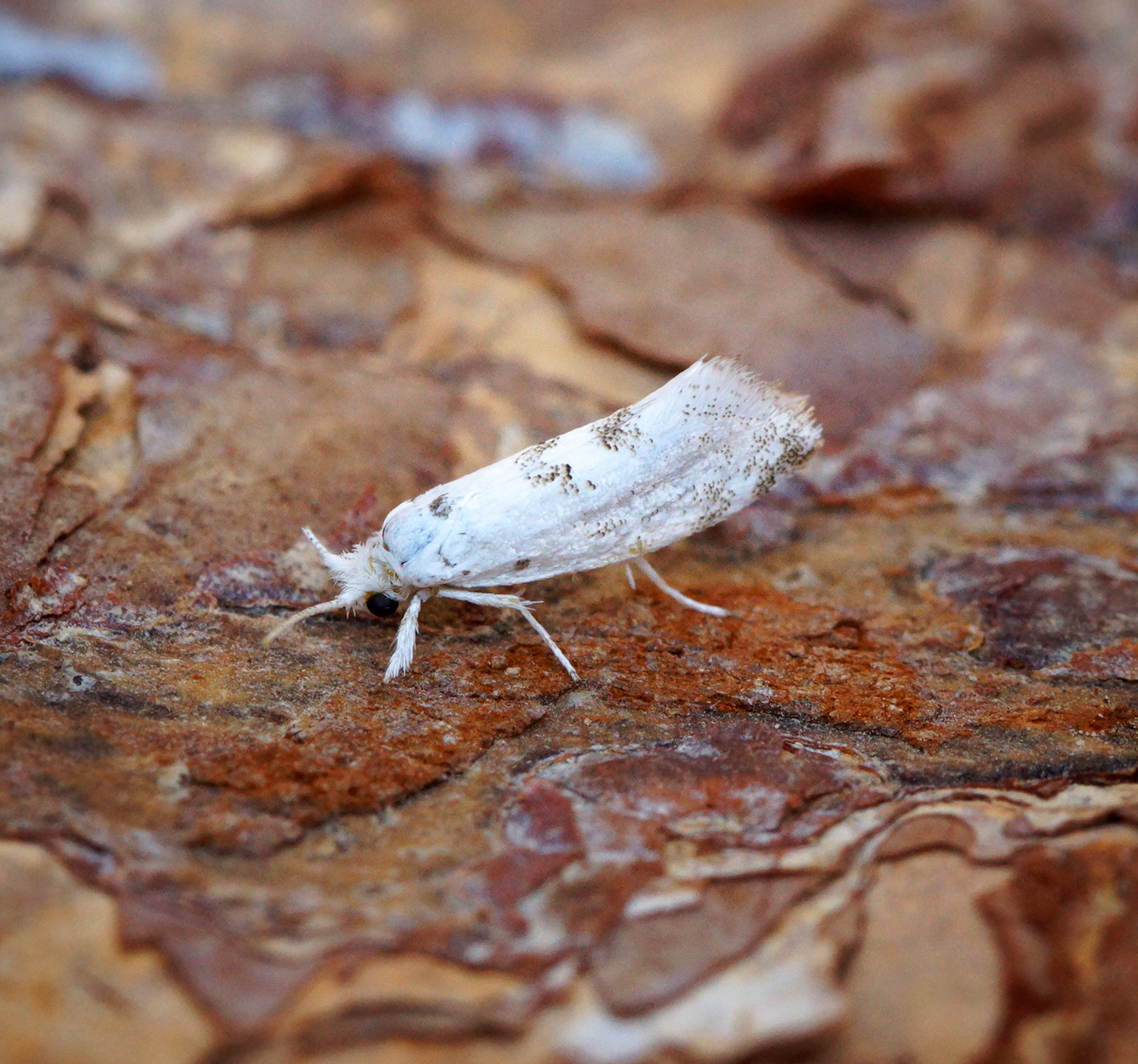

Scientific classification
- Kingdom: Animalia
- Phylum: Arthropoda
- Clade: Pancrustacea
- Class: Insecta
- Order: Lepidoptera
- Family: Yponomeutidae
- Genus: Niphonympha
- Species: N. dealbatella

Binomial name
- Niphonympha dealbatella (Zeller, 1847)

Synonyms
- Calantica dealbatella Zeller, 1847; Calantica albella Zeller, 1847; Niphonympha albella

= Niphonympha dealbatella =

Species of moth

Niphonympha dealbatella is a moth of the family Yponomeutidae. It is found in France, Germany, the Czech Republic, Austria, Switzerland, Italy, Slovakia, Hungary, Romania and on Corsica and Sicily. It is also found in Turkey.
