= Tarphyscelis =

Scientific classification
- Kingdom: Animalia
- Phylum: Arthropoda
- Class: Insecta
- Order: Lepidoptera
- Family: Yponomeutidae
- Genus: Tarphyscelis

Species
- See text

Genus of moths

Tarphyscelis is a genus of moths of the family Yponomeutidae.

== Species ==
- Tarphyscelis cirrhozona - Meyrick, 1921
- Tarphyscelis palaeota - Meyrick, 1913
