= Pseudotalara =

Scientific classification
- Kingdom: Animalia
- Phylum: Arthropoda
- Class: Insecta
- Order: Lepidoptera
- Family: Yponomeutidae
- Subfamily: Yponomeutinae
- Genus: Pseudotalara; Druce, 1885

Species
- See text

Genus of moths

Pseudotalara is a genus of moths of the family Yponomeutidae. The Global Lepidoptera Names Index lists it as a synonym of Eustixis.

== Species ==
- Pseudotalara chrysippa - Druce, 1885
