= Teinoptila clavata =

Scientific classification
- Kingdom: Animalia
- Phylum: Arthropoda
- Clade: Pancrustacea
- Class: Insecta
- Order: Lepidoptera
- Family: Yponomeutidae
- Genus: Teinoptila
- Species: T. clavata

Binomial name
- Teinoptila clavata Q. Jin, S.X. Wang & H.H. Li, 2009

Species of moth

Teinoptila clavata is a moth of the family Yponomeutidae. It is found in Guangxi, China.

The wingspan is 15–16 mm.

== Etymology ==
The specific name is from the Latin clavatus, referring to the clavate sacculus in the male genitalia.
