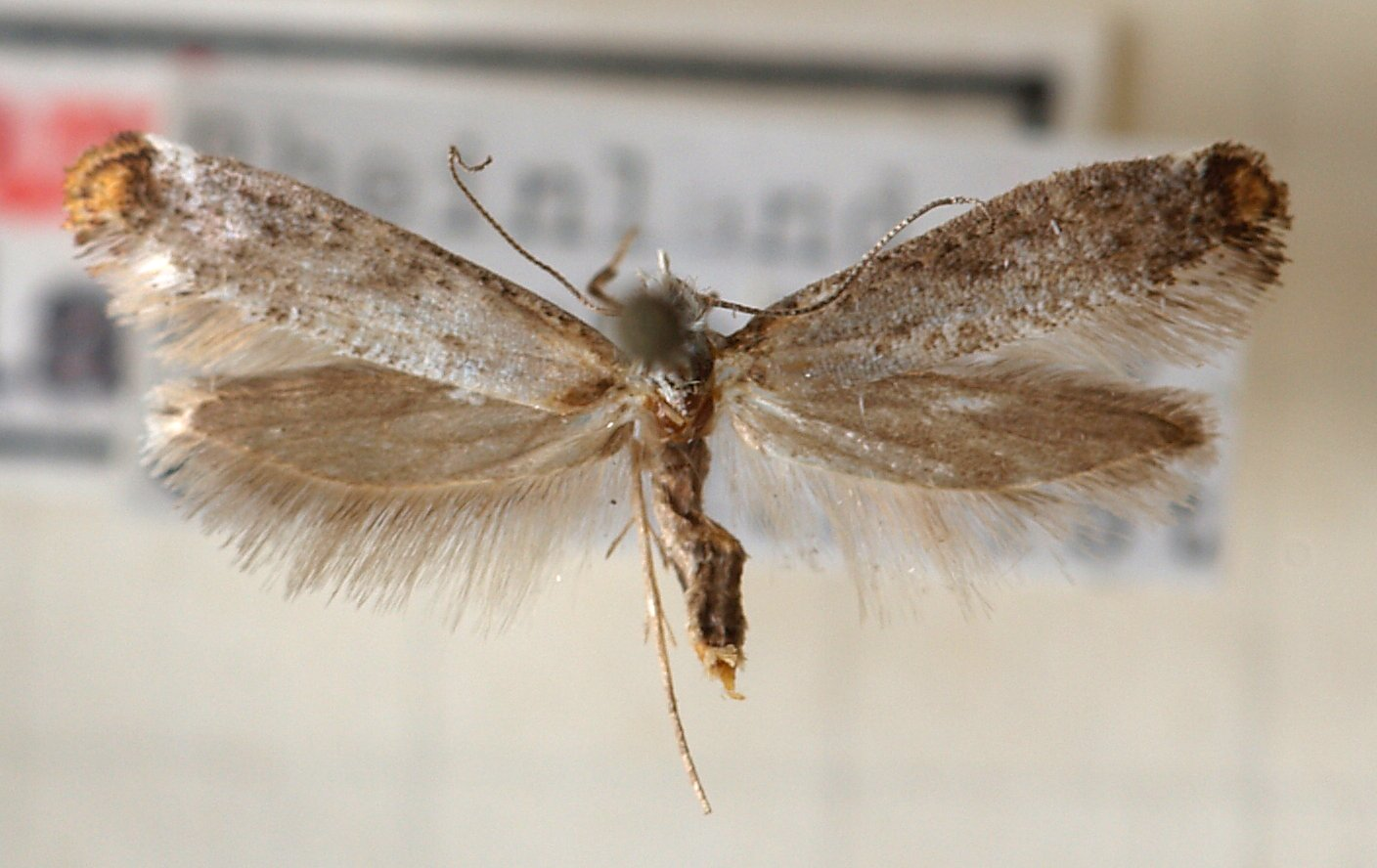

Scientific classification
- Kingdom: Animalia
- Phylum: Arthropoda
- Clade: Pancrustacea
- Class: Insecta
- Order: Lepidoptera
- Family: Yponomeutidae
- Genus: Pseudoswammerdamia
- Species: P. combinella

Binomial name
- Pseudoswammerdamia combinella (Hübner, 1786)

Synonyms
- Tinea combinella Hübner, 1786

= Pseudoswammerdamia combinella =

Species of moth

Pseudoswammerdamia combinella is a moth of the family Yponomeutidae. It is found in Europe and Anatolia.

The wingspan is 13–16 mm. The head is white, sometimes fuscous-mixed. Forewings are light greyish -ochreous more or less irrorated with white; base of dorsum fuscous; several longitudinal series of dark fuscous marks; a roundish golden-ochreous apical spot, partly edged anteriorly with dark fuscous; apical cilia fuscous, with two black lines. The larva is dull green; dorsal line darker; subdorsal series of dull red dots; head yellowish.

The moth flies from April to May..

The larvae feed on Prunus spinosa.

== Notes ==
1. The flight season refers to Belgium and the Netherlands. This may vary in other parts of the range.
