= Niphonympha =

Scientific classification
- Kingdom: Animalia
- Phylum: Arthropoda
- Class: Insecta
- Order: Lepidoptera
- Family: Yponomeutidae
- Subfamily: Yponomeutinae
- Genus: Niphonympha; Meyrick, 1914

Species
- See text

Enhenus Of OOoh 022225520

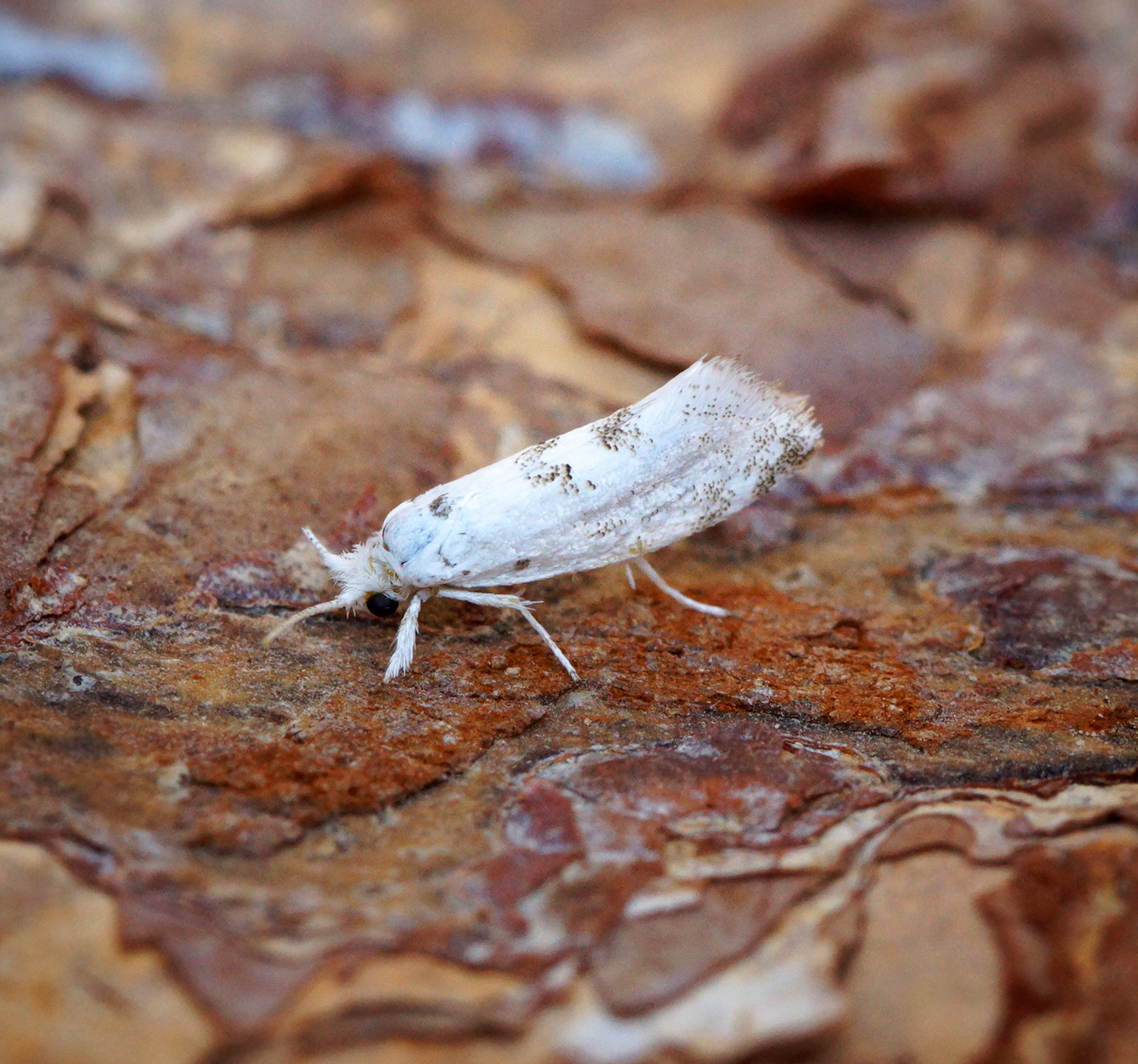
Niphonympha dealbatella

Niphonympha is a genus of moths of the family Yponomeutidae.

== Species ==
- Niphonympha argentea - Busck, 1912
- Niphonympha dealbatella - Zeller, 1847
- Niphonympha delias (Meyrick, 1913) (from India/Assam)
- Niphonympha devota (Meyrick, 1913) (from India/Assam)
- Niphonympha duplicata (Meyrick, 1913) (from Sri Lanka)
- Niphonympha oxydelta - (Meyrick, 1913) (from India/Coorg)
- Niphonympha vera - Moriuti, 1963
