= Teinoptila bolidias =

Scientific classification
- Kingdom: Animalia
- Phylum: Arthropoda
- Class: Insecta
- Order: Lepidoptera
- Family: Yponomeutidae
- Genus: Teinoptila
- Species: T. bolidias

Binomial name
- Teinoptila bolidias (Meyrick, 1913)

Synonyms
- Hyponomeuta bolidias Meyrick, 1913; Yponomeuta bolidias; Choutinea shaanxiensis Huang, 1982

Species of moth

Teinoptila bolidias is a moth of the family Yponomeutidae. It is found in China (Gansu, Hubei, Hunan, Shaanxi, Yunnan, Zhejiang) and Thailand.

The wingspan is 21–27 mm
