= Pseudozelota mima =

Scientific classification
- Kingdom: Animalia
- Phylum: Arthropoda
- Class: Insecta
- Order: Coleoptera
- Suborder: Polyphaga
- Infraorder: Cucujiformia
- Family: Cerambycidae
- Genus: Pseudozelota
- Species: P. mima

Binomial name
- Pseudozelota mima (Breuning, 1938)

Synonyms
- Parazelota mima Breuning, 1938

Species of beetle

Pseudozelota mima is a species of beetle in the family Cerambycidae. It was described by Stephan von Breuning in 1938, originally under the genus Parazelota. It is known from Borneo.
