= Chionogenes drosochlora =

Scientific classification
- Kingdom: Animalia
- Phylum: Arthropoda
- Class: Insecta
- Order: Lepidoptera
- Family: Yponomeutidae
- Genus: Chionogenes
- Species: C. drosochlora

Binomial name
- Chionogenes drosochlora (Meyrick, 1907)

Synonyms
- Anticrates drosochlora Meyrick, 1907

Species of moth

Chionogenes drosochlora is a moth of the family Yponomeutidae. It is found in Australia.
