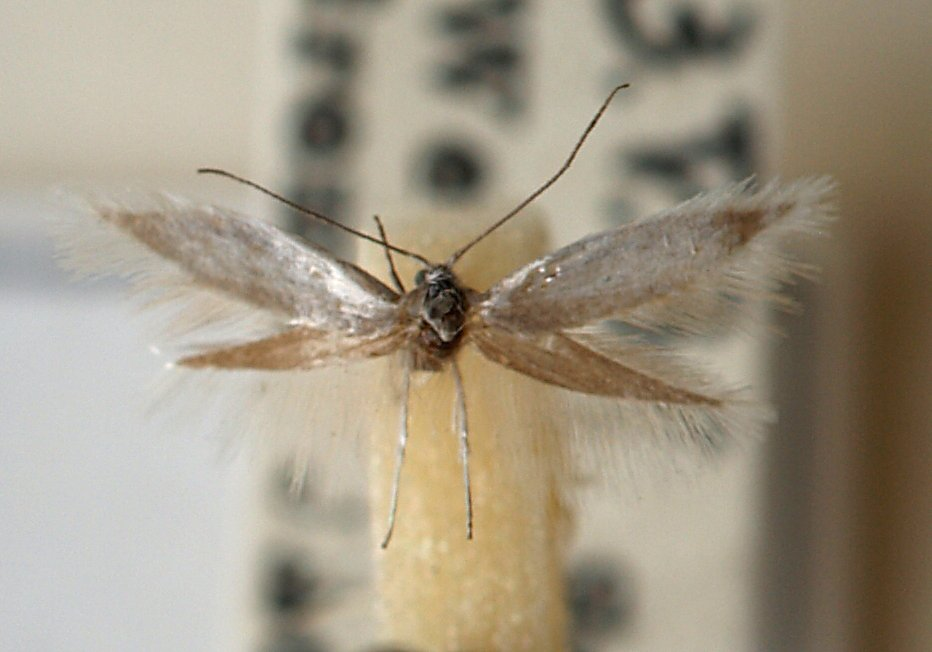
- Ocnerostoma piniariella

Scientific classification
- Kingdom: Animalia
- Phylum: Arthropoda
- Clade: Pancrustacea
- Class: Insecta
- Order: Lepidoptera
- Family: Yponomeutidae
- Subfamily: Yponomeutinae
- Genus: Ocnerostoma; Zeller, 1847

Species
- See text

= Ocnerostoma =

Genus of moths

Ocnerostoma is a genus of moths of the family Yponomeutidae.

== Species ==
- Ocnerostoma argentella - Zeller, 1839
- Ocnerostoma copiosella - Frey, 1856
- Ocnerostoma friesei - Svensson, 1966
- Ocnerostoma piniariella - Zeller, 1847
- Ocnerostoma strobivorum - Freeman, 1961
