= Teinoptila brunnescens =

Scientific classification
- Kingdom: Animalia
- Phylum: Arthropoda
- Class: Insecta
- Order: Lepidoptera
- Family: Yponomeutidae
- Genus: Teinoptila
- Species: T. brunnescens

Binomial name
- Teinoptila brunnescens (Moore, 1888)

Synonyms
- Hyponomeuta brunnescens Moore, 1888; Yponomeuta brunnescens

Species of moth

Teinoptila brunnescens is a moth of the family Yponomeutidae. It is found in China (Yunnan), India and Nepal.

The wingspan is 22 to 23.5 millimetres (0.87 to 0.93 in).
