= Banghaasia =

Scientific classification
- Domain: Eukaryota
- Kingdom: Animalia
- Phylum: Arthropoda
- Class: Insecta
- Order: Lepidoptera
- Family: Yponomeutidae
- Subfamily: Yponomeutinae
- Genus: Banghaasia; Friese, 1960
- Species: B. ildefonsella

Binomial name
- Banghaasia ildefonsella Friese, 1960

Genus of moths

Banghaasia is a genus of moths of the family Yponomeutidae. It contains only one species, Banghaasia ildefonsella, which is found in Spain.
