= Palleura =

Scientific classification
- Kingdom: Animalia
- Phylum: Arthropoda
- Class: Insecta
- Order: Lepidoptera
- Family: Yponomeutidae
- Subfamily: Yponomeutinae
- Genus: Palleura; Turner, 1926

Type species
- Palleura Nitida Turner, 1926

Genus of moths

Palleura is a genus of moths of the family Yponomeutidae found in Australia. It contains one species Palleura Nitida.
