= Euhyponomeutoides =

Scientific classification
- Kingdom: Animalia
- Phylum: Arthropoda
- Class: Insecta
- Order: Lepidoptera
- Family: Yponomeutidae
- Subfamily: Yponomeutinae
- Genus: Euhyponomeutoides; Gaj, 1954

Species
- See text

Synonyms
- Nordmaniana Friese, 1960

Genus of moths

Euhyponomeutoides is a genus of moths of the family Yponomeutidae.

== Species ==
- Euhyponomeutoides albithoracellus - Gaj, 1954
- Euhyponomeutoides lushanensis - Gozmany, 1960
- Euhyponomeutoides namikoae - Moriuti, 1977
- Euhyponomeutoides petrias - Meyrick, 1907
- Euhyponomeutoides ribesiella - (de Joannis, 1900)
- Euhyponomeutoides spadix - J.C. Sohn & C.S. Wu, 2010
- Euhyponomeutoides trachydelta - Meyrick, 1931
