= Chionogenes isanema =

Scientific classification
- Kingdom: Animalia
- Phylum: Arthropoda
- Class: Insecta
- Order: Lepidoptera
- Family: Yponomeutidae
- Genus: Chionogenes
- Species: C. isanema

Binomial name
- Chionogenes isanema (Meyrick, 1907)

Synonyms
- Anticrates isanema Meyrick, 1907

Species of moth

Chionogenes isanema is a moth of the family Yponomeutidae. It is found in Australia including Tasmania.
