= Syncathartis =

Scientific classification
- Kingdom: Animalia
- Phylum: Arthropoda
- Class: Insecta
- Order: Lepidoptera
- Family: Yponomeutidae
- Genus: Syncathartis; Meyrick, 1921
- Species: S. Argestis

Binomial name
- Syncathartis Argestis Meyrick, 1921

Genus of moths

Syncathartis is a monotypic genus of moths of the family Yponomeutidae. It contains only the species Syncathartis argestis.
