= Spaniophylla =

Scientific classification
- Kingdom: Animalia
- Phylum: Arthropoda
- Class: Insecta
- Order: Lepidoptera
- Family: Yponomeutidae
- Subfamily: Yponomeutinae
- Genus: Spaniophylla; Turner, 1917

Type species
- Spaniophylla epiclithra Turner, 1917

Genus of moths

Spaniophylla is a monotypic genus of moths of the family Yponomeutidae. The type and only species in the genus is Spaniophylla epiclithra Turner, 1917. It is found in Australia. It is placed incertae sedis within Yponomeutoidea.

== Description ==
Spaniophylla epiclithra is described by Turner as follows:

♂ ♀ 10–11 mm. Head white. Palpi white; second joint grey externally except at apex. Antennæ white, apical ⅔ dark-fuscous; ciliations in ♂ 1. Thorax white. Abdomen pale-grey. Legs white; anterior tarsi fuscous; middle and posterior annulated with fuscous. Forewings moderate, costa gently arched, apex round-pointed, termen straight, oblique; white, but with most of posterior half of disc suffused with brownish-grey; costal edge near base fuscous; a fuscous subcostal dot near base, a second beneath that at ⅓, and a third between centre of disc and tornus; a broad ochreous bar with rounded ends in middle of disc between ¼ and centre; cilia brownish-grey. Hindwings and cilia grey.

— Alfred Jefferis Turner
