= Charicrita orthonina =

Scientific classification
- Domain: Eukaryota
- Kingdom: Animalia
- Phylum: Arthropoda
- Class: Insecta
- Order: Lepidoptera
- Family: Yponomeutidae
- Genus: Charicrita
- Species: C. orthonina

Binomial name
- Charicrita orthonina Turner, 1927

Synonyms
- Charicrita othonina

Species of moth

Charicrita orthonina is a moth of the family Yponomeutidae. It is found in Australia, including Tasmania.
