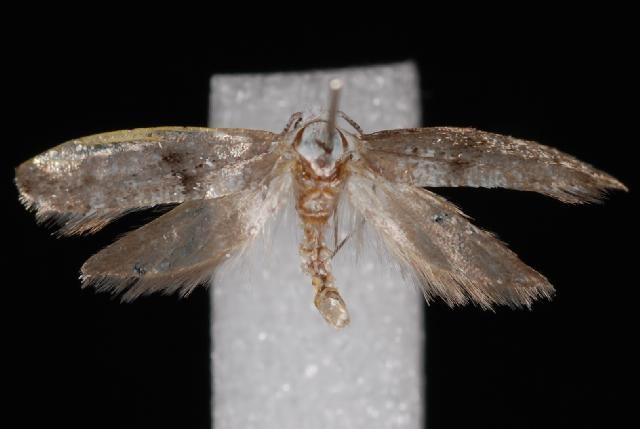

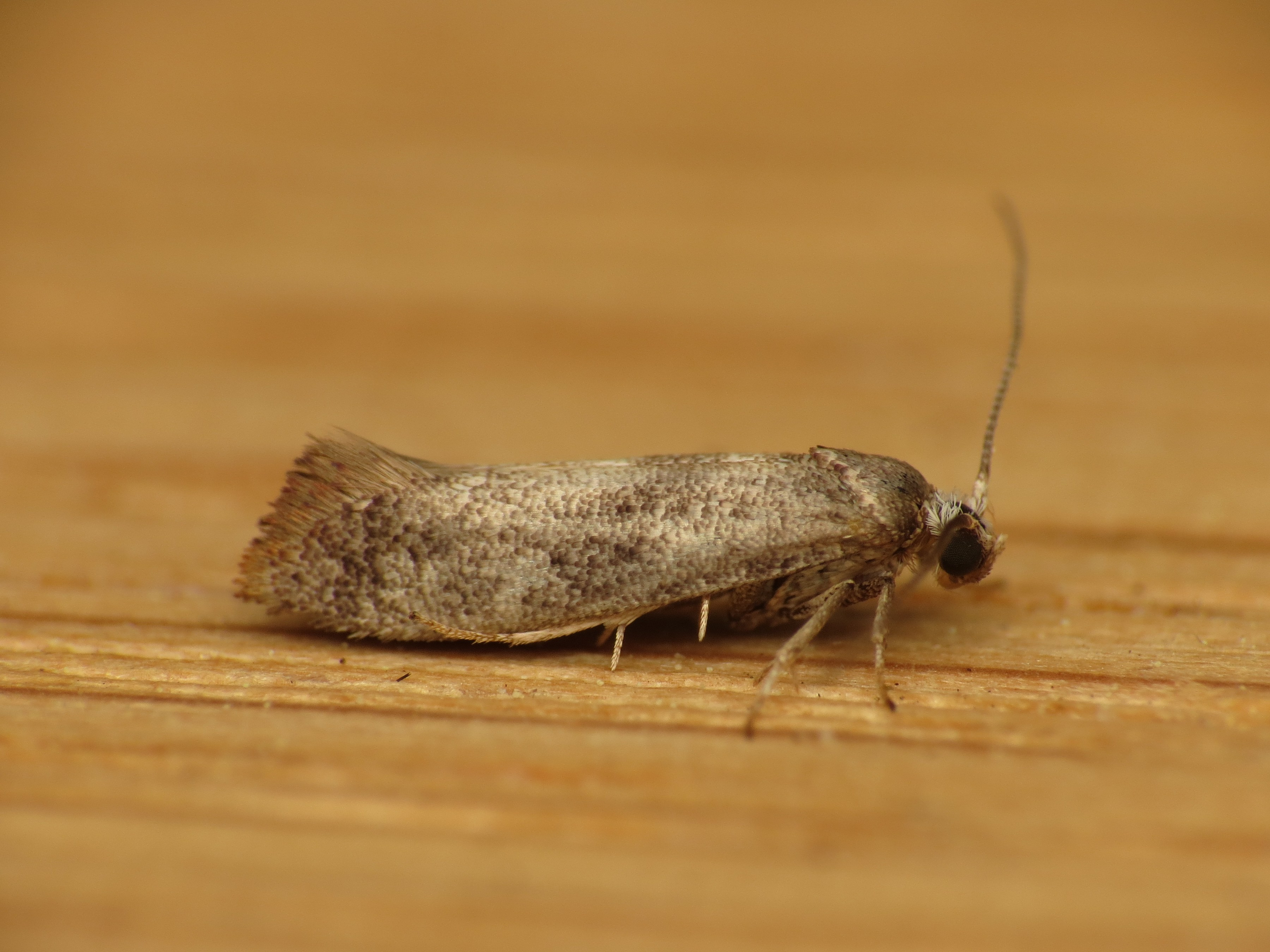

Scientific classification
- Kingdom: Animalia
- Phylum: Arthropoda
- Clade: Pancrustacea
- Class: Insecta
- Order: Lepidoptera
- Family: Yponomeutidae
- Genus: Swammerdamia
- Species: S. caesiella

Binomial name
- Swammerdamia caesiella (Hübner, 1796)

Synonyms
- Tinea caesiella Hübner, 1796; Swammerdamia heroldella Hübner, [1825]; Swammerdamia heroldella; Tinea nubeculella Tengström, 1848; Swammerdamia nubeculella; Tinea griseocapitella Stainton, 1851; Swammerdamia griseocapitella

= Swammerdamia caesiella =

Species of moth

Swammerdamia caesiella is a moth of the family Yponomeutidae. It is found from most of Europe to Japan. It is also present in North America, where it is possibly an introduced species.

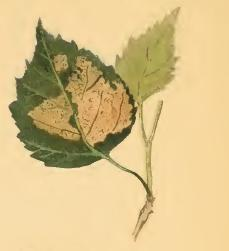
Gnawed birch leaves

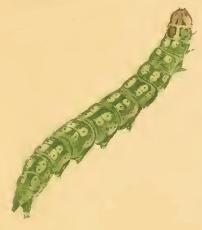
Larva

The wingspan is 9–13 mm. The head is white. The thorax is white, sometimes anteriorly fuscous-sprinkled. Forewings are white, irregularly irrorated with fuscous; some longitudinal series of blackish dots; antemedian dark fuscous fascia reduced to two spots, discal and dorsal; two white spots on costa posteriorly, separated by a dark fuscous spot; cilia coppery-tinged, with two dark purplish-fuscons lines. Hindwings are pale fuscous. The larva is reddish-brown; dorsal line broad, paler, becoming indistinct posteriorly; spiracular broad, yellowish-white; head pale yellow-ochreous.

They are on wing from May to June and again in August in two generations per year.

The larvae feed on Betula species.
