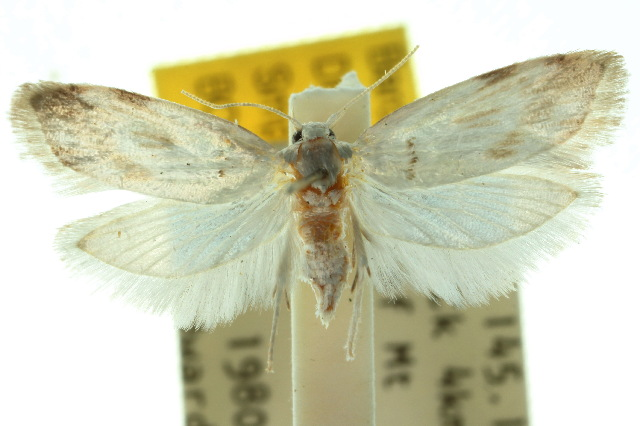

Scientific classification
- Kingdom: Animalia
- Phylum: Arthropoda
- Class: Insecta
- Order: Lepidoptera
- Family: Yponomeutidae
- Subfamily: Yponomeutinae
- Genus: Litaneutis; Meyrick, 1913

Species
- See text

= Litaneutis =

Genus of insects

Litaneutis is a genus of moths of the family Yponomeutidae. It is monotypic containing only one species Litaneutis sacrificia. It is found in Samoa, India, and Australia.
