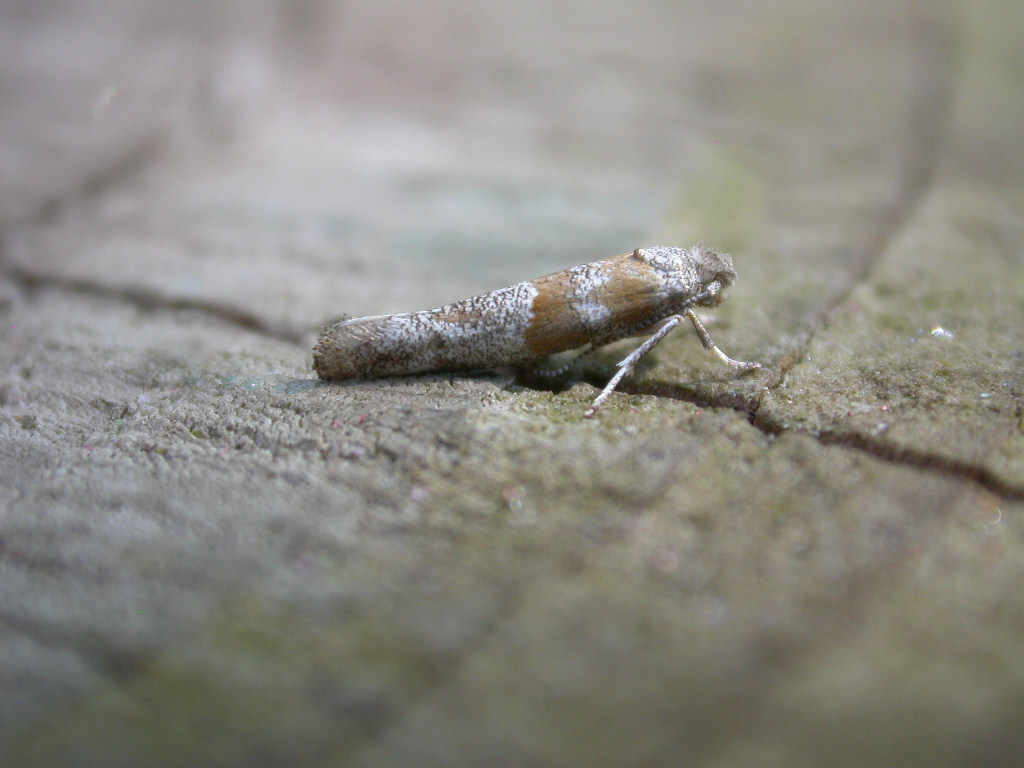

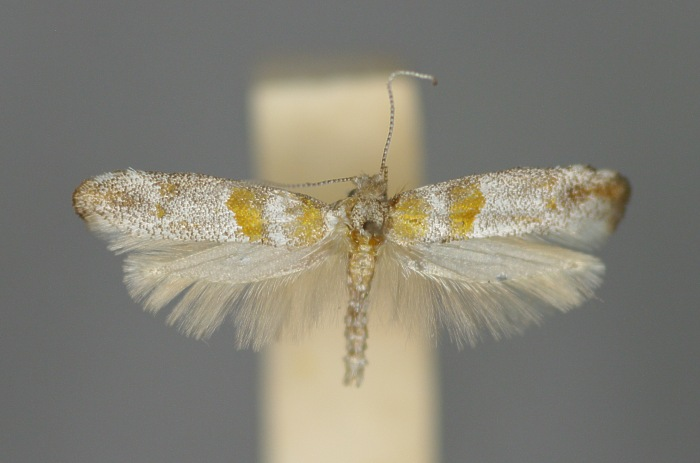

Scientific classification
- Kingdom: Animalia
- Phylum: Arthropoda
- Clade: Pancrustacea
- Class: Insecta
- Order: Lepidoptera
- Family: Yponomeutidae
- Genus: Cedestis
- Species: C. gysseleniella

Binomial name
- Cedestis gysseleniella (Zeller, 1839)

Synonyms
- Argyresthia gysseleniella Zeller, 1839; Oecophora gysselinella Duponchel, 1840; Eucedestis gysseleniella

= Cedestis gysseleniella =

Species of moth

Cedestis gysseleniella is a moth of the family Yponomeutidae. It is found in Europe and parts of Russia.

The wingspan is 11–13 mm. Adults are on wing from June to July depending on the location.

The larvae feed on Abies alba, Abies fabri, Pinus mugo, Pinus sylvestris, Pinus tabuliformis, and Pinus contorta. Although Vaccinium myrtillus has been listed as host plant in Gershenson and Ulenberg 1998, this listing is considered "suspicious" by the more recently published Lewis and Sohn 2015.
