= Teinoptila guttella =

Scientific classification
- Kingdom: Animalia
- Phylum: Arthropoda
- Class: Insecta
- Order: Lepidoptera
- Family: Yponomeutidae
- Genus: Teinoptila
- Species: T. guttella

Binomial name
- Teinoptila guttella Moriuti, 1977

Species of moth

Teinoptila guttella is a moth of the family Yponomeutidae. It is found in Taiwan and Japan.
