= Nymphonia zaleuca =

Scientific classification
- Kingdom: Animalia
- Phylum: Arthropoda
- Class: Insecta
- Order: Lepidoptera
- Family: Yponomeutidae
- Genus: Nymphonia
- Species: N. zaleuca

Binomial name
- Nymphonia zaleuca Meyrick, 1913

Species of moth

Nymphonia zaleuca is a moth of the family Yponomeutidae. It is found in Australia.
