= Buxeta =

Scientific classification
- Kingdom: Animalia
- Phylum: Arthropoda
- Class: Insecta
- Order: Lepidoptera
- Family: Yponomeutidae
- Genus: Buxeta; Walker, 1866
- Species: B. conflagrans

Binomial name
- Buxeta conflagrans Walker, 1864

Genus of moths

Buxeta is a genus of moths of the family Yponomeutidae. Buxeta conflagrans is the only species in the genus.
