= Betharga =

Scientific classification
- Kingdom: Animalia
- Phylum: Arthropoda
- Clade: Pancrustacea
- Class: Insecta
- Order: Lepidoptera
- Family: Yponomeutidae
- Genus: Betharga
- Species: B. lycoides

Binomial name
- Betharga lycoides Walker, 1865

Genus of moths

Betharga is a genus of moths of the family Yponomeutidae.It is monotypic containing only the species Betharga lycoides.
