= Protonoma =

Scientific classification
- Kingdom: Animalia
- Phylum: Arthropoda
- Class: Insecta
- Order: Lepidoptera
- Family: Yponomeutidae
- Genus: Protonoma

Species
- See text

Genus of moths

Protonoma is a genus of moths of the family Yponomeutidae.

== Species ==
- Protonoma glomeratrix - Meyrick, 1938
