= Metanomeuta =

Scientific classification
- Kingdom: Animalia
- Phylum: Arthropoda
- Class: Insecta
- Order: Lepidoptera
- Family: Yponomeutidae
- Genus: Metanomeuta; Meyrick, 1935

Species
- See text

Genus of moths

Metanomeuta is a genus of moths of the family Yponomeutidae found in China and Japan.

== Species ==
There are currently three recognized species in Metanomeuta.

- Metanomeuta fulvicrinis Meyrick, 1935
- Metanomeuta spinisparsula Jin & Wang, 2008
- Metanomeuta yuexiensis Jin & Wang, 2008
