= Ithutomus =

Scientific classification
- Kingdom: Animalia
- Phylum: Arthropoda
- Class: Insecta
- Order: Lepidoptera
- Family: Yponomeutidae
- Genus: Ithutomus

Species
- See text

Genus of moths

Ithutomus is a genus of moths of the family Yponomeutidae. At least one of its species, Ithutomus valdivianus has a range in the Valdivia region of Chile.

== Species ==
- Ithutomus formosus - Butler, 1883
- Ithutomus valdivianus - Beécher and Parra, 1998
