= Pronomeuta sarcopis =

Scientific classification
- Kingdom: Animalia
- Phylum: Arthropoda
- Class: Insecta
- Order: Lepidoptera
- Superfamily: Zygaenoidea
- Family: Zygaenidae
- Genus: Pronomeuta
- Species: P. sarcopis

Binomial name
- Pronomeuta sarcopis Meyrick, 1905

Species of moth

Pronomeuta sarcopis is a moth in the family Zygaenidae. It was described by Edward Meyrick in 1905 from Sri Lanka.

The wingspan is 15–18 mm. The forewings are light fuscous or fuscous-ochreous, irregularly strewn with small dark fuscous dots. The discal stigmata are rather large and dark fuscous. The hindwings are dull fuscous-reddish.

The larvae are known to attack Hydnocarpus wightianus.
