= Palaetheta =

Scientific classification
- Kingdom: Animalia
- Phylum: Arthropoda
- Class: Insecta
- Order: Lepidoptera
- Family: Yponomeutidae
- Genus: Palaetheta

Species
- See text

Genus of moths

Palaetheta is a genus of moths of the family Yponomeutidae.

== Species ==
- Palaetheta innocua - Meyrick, 1911
- Palaetheta ischnozona - Meyrick, 1909
