= Pseudorinympha =

Scientific classification
- Kingdom: Animalia
- Phylum: Arthropoda
- Class: Insecta
- Order: Lepidoptera
- Family: Yponomeutidae
- Genus: Pseudorinympha
- Species: P. laeta

Binomial name
- Pseudorinympha laeta Clarke, 1971

Genus of moths

Pseudorinympha is a genus of moths of the family Yponomeutidae found on rapa. It is a monotypic genus containing only the species Pseudorinympha laeta.
