= Abacistis =

Scientific classification
- Kingdom: Animalia
- Phylum: Arthropoda
- Class: Insecta
- Order: Lepidoptera
- Family: Yponomeutidae
- Genus: Abacistis

Species
- See text

Genus of moths

Abacistis is a genus of moths of the family Yponomeutidae.

== Species ==
- Abacistis hexanoma - Meyrick, 1913
- Abacistis teligera - Meyrick, 1914
