= Cymonympha =

Scientific classification
- Kingdom: Animalia
- Phylum: Arthropoda
- Class: Insecta
- Order: Lepidoptera
- Family: Yponomeutidae
- Genus: Cymonympha

Species
- See text

Genus of moths

Cymonympha is a genus of moths of the family Yponomeutidae. This genus only contains one species, that has a wingspan of 7mm:

== Species ==
- Cymonympha xantholeuca - Meyrick, 1927 (from Samoa)
