= Euarne =

Scientific classification
- Kingdom: Animalia
- Phylum: Arthropoda
- Clade: Pancrustacea
- Class: Insecta
- Order: Lepidoptera
- Family: Yponomeutidae
- Genus: Euarne

Species
- See text

Genus of moths

Euarne is a genus of moths of the family Yponomeutidae. It is named after Euarne, one of Hesiod's 50 Nereids (Hesiod, Theogony, Paragraph 240).

== Species ==
- Euarne obligatella - Möschler, 1890
