= Syncrotaulella =

Scientific classification
- Kingdom: Animalia
- Phylum: Arthropoda
- Class: Insecta
- Order: Lepidoptera
- Family: Yponomeutidae
- Genus: Syncrotaulella; Fletcher, 1940
- Species: S. strepsicentra

Binomial name
- Syncrotaulella strepsicentra Meyrick, 1937

Synonyms
- Syncrotaula Meyrick, 1937

Genus of moths

Syncrotaulella is a monotypic genus of moths of the family Yponomeutidae. It contains only the species Syncrotaulella strepsicentra.
