= Diaphragmistis =

Scientific classification
- Kingdom: Animalia
- Phylum: Arthropoda
- Class: Insecta
- Order: Lepidoptera
- Family: Yponomeutidae
- Genus: Diaphragmistis; Meyrick, 1914

Type species
- Diaphragmistis macroglena Meyrick, 1914

Species
- See text

Genus of moths

Diaphragmistis is a genus of moths of the family Yponomeutidae. It was described in 1914 by Edward Meyrick, with Diaphragmistis macroglena from India as the type species. Two additional species, D. trapezia and D. ventiprocessa were discovered in China in 2013.

== Species ==
- Diaphragmistis macroglena - Meyrick, 1914
- Diaphragmistis trapezia - Wang, 2013
- Diaphragmistis ventiprocessa - Wang, 2013
