= Zygographa =

Scientific classification
- Kingdom: Animalia
- Phylum: Arthropoda
- Class: Insecta
- Order: Lepidoptera
- Family: Yponomeutidae
- Genus: Zygographa

Species
- See text

Genus of moths

Zygographa is a genus of moths of the family Yponomeutidae. It containins only one species Zygographa asaphochalca.
