= Exanthica =

Scientific classification
- Kingdom: Animalia
- Phylum: Arthropoda
- Class: Insecta
- Order: Lepidoptera
- Family: Yponomeutidae
- Genus: Exanthica

Species
- See text

Genus of moths

Exanthica is a genus of moths of the family Yponomeutidae.

== Species ==
- Exanthica atelacma - Meyrick, 1926
- Exanthica trigonella - Felder, 1875
