= Aictis =

Scientific classification
- Kingdom: Animalia
- Phylum: Arthropoda
- Class: Insecta
- Order: Lepidoptera
- Family: Yponomeutidae
- Genus: Aictis
- Species: A. erythrozona

Binomial name
- Aictis erythrozona Turner, 1926

Genus of moths

Aictis is a genus of moths of the family Yponomeutidae. It is monotypic containing only the species Aictis erythrozona.
