= Conchiophora =

Scientific classification
- Kingdom: Animalia
- Phylum: Arthropoda
- Class: Insecta
- Order: Lepidoptera
- Family: Yponomeutidae
- Genus: Conchiophora; Chrétien, 1915
- Species: C. spinosella

Binomial name
- Conchiophora spinosella Chrétien, 1916

Genus of moths

Conchiophora is a monotypic genus of moths of the family Yponomeutidae. It contains only the species Conchiophora spinosella.
