= Amalthina =

Scientific classification
- Kingdom: Animalia
- Phylum: Arthropoda
- Clade: Pancrustacea
- Class: Insecta
- Order: Lepidoptera
- Family: Yponomeutidae
- Genus: Amalthina
- Species: A. Laceata

Binomial name
- Amalthina Laceata Meyrick, 1914

Genus of moths

Amalthina is a genus of moths of the family Yponomeutidae. It contains only the species Amalthina Laceata.
