= Pseudozelota =

Scientific classification
- Kingdom: Animalia
- Phylum: Arthropoda
- Class: Insecta
- Order: Coleoptera
- Suborder: Polyphaga
- Infraorder: Cucujiformia
- Family: Cerambycidae
- Tribe: Mesosini
- Genus: Pseudozelota

Genus of beetles

Pseudozelota is a genus of longhorn beetles of the subfamily Lamiinae, containing the following species:

subgenus Hefferniella

- Pseudozelota mima (Breuning, 1938)
- Pseudozelota punctipennis (Schwarzer, 1930)

subgenus Pseudozelota

- Pseudozelota capito (Pascoe, 1865)
