= Caminophantis =

Scientific classification
- Kingdom: Animalia
- Phylum: Arthropoda
- Class: Insecta
- Order: Lepidoptera
- Family: Yponomeutidae
- Genus: Caminophantis
- Species: C. mystolitha

Binomial name
- Caminophantis mystolitha Meyrick, 1933

Genus of moths

Caminophantis is a monotypic genus of moths of the family Yponomeutidae. It presently includes only one species, Caminophantis mystolitha which is found in Fiji.
