= Dascia =

Scientific classification
- Kingdom: Animalia
- Phylum: Arthropoda
- Class: Insecta
- Order: Lepidoptera
- Family: Yponomeutidae
- Genus: Dascia
- Species: D. sagittifera

Binomial name
- Dascia sagittifera Meyrick, 1893

Genus of moths

Dascia is a genus of moths of the family Yponomeutidae. It is monotypic and contains only the species Dascia sagittifera.
