= Nematobola =

Scientific classification
- Kingdom: Animalia
- Phylum: Arthropoda
- Class: Insecta
- Order: Lepidoptera
- Family: Yponomeutidae
- Genus: Nematobola

Species
- See text

Genus of moths

Nematobola is a genus of moths of the family Yponomeutidae.

== Species ==
- Nematobola candescens - Meyrick, 1892
- Nematobola isorista - Meyrick, 1892
- Nematobola orthotricha - Meyrick, 1892
