= Balanoptica =

Scientific classification
- Kingdom: Animalia
- Phylum: Arthropoda
- Class: Insecta
- Order: Lepidoptera
- Family: Yponomeutidae
- Genus: Balanoptica; Meyrick, 1930
- Species: B. orbicularis

Binomial name
- Balanoptica orbicularis Felder & Rogenhofer, 1875

Genus of moths

Balanoptica is a genus of moths of the family Yponomeutidae. It contains only one species, Balanoptica orbicularis.
