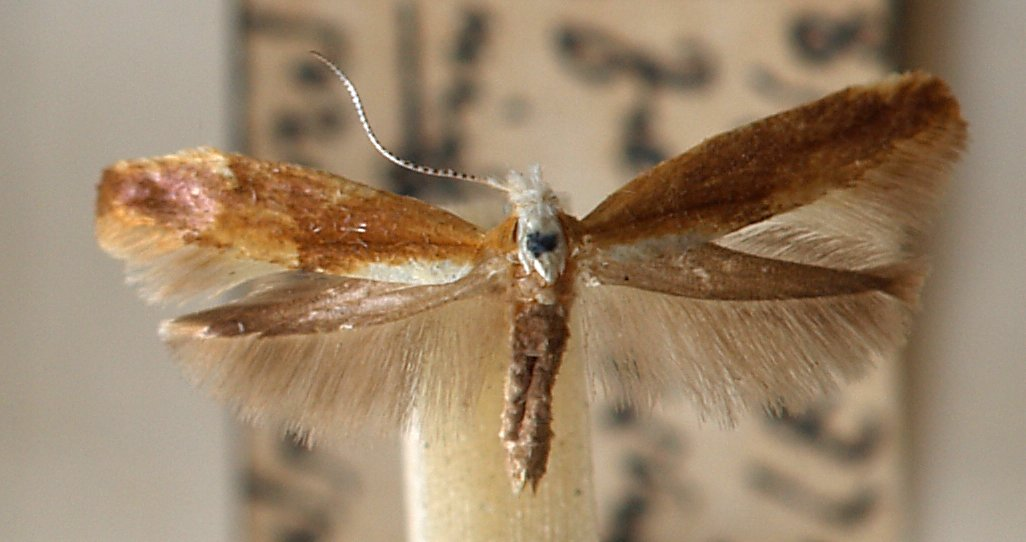
- Argyresthia albistria

Scientific classification
- Kingdom: Animalia
- Phylum: Arthropoda
- Class: Insecta
- Order: Lepidoptera
- Family: Yponomeutidae
- Genus: Argyresthites

Species
- See text

= Argyresthites =

Genus of moths

Argyresthites is a genus of moths of the family Yponomeutidae.

== Species ==
- Argyresthites balticella - Rebel, 1935
- Argyresthites succinella - Rebel, 1934
