= Parexaula =

Scientific classification
- Kingdom: Animalia
- Phylum: Arthropoda
- Class: Insecta
- Order: Lepidoptera
- Family: Yponomeutidae
- Genus: Parexaula

Species
- See text

Genus of moths

Parexaula is a genus of moths of the family Yponomeutidae.

== Species ==
- Parexaula isomima - Meyrick, 1909
