= Oridryas =

Scientific classification
- Kingdom: Animalia
- Phylum: Arthropoda
- Class: Insecta
- Order: Lepidoptera
- Family: Yponomeutidae
- Genus: Oridryas; Meyrick, 1938

Species
- See text

Genus of moths

Oridryas is a genus of moths of the family Yponomeutidae. However, Sohn and Stᾰnescu (2016) consider it a synonym of Ypsolopha.

== Species ==
There are two accepted species:

- Oridryas angarensis Caradja, 1939 – Shanxi, China
- Oridryas isalopex Meyrick, 1938 – Yunnan, China
