= Citrinarchis =

Scientific classification
- Kingdom: Animalia
- Phylum: Arthropoda
- Clade: Pancrustacea
- Class: Insecta
- Order: Lepidoptera
- Family: Yponomeutidae
- Genus: Citrinarchis
- Species: C. oxyphanta

Binomial name
- Citrinarchis oxyphanta Meyrick, 1938

Genus of moths

Citrinarchis is a genus of moths of the family Yponomeutidae.
