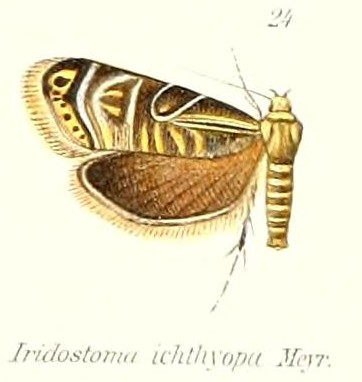
- Iridostoma ichthyopa

Scientific classification
- Kingdom: Animalia
- Phylum: Arthropoda
- Class: Insecta
- Order: Lepidoptera
- Family: Yponomeutidae
- Genus: Iridostoma

Species
- See text

= Iridostoma =

Genus of moths

Iridostoma is a genus of moths of the family Yponomeutidae.

== Species ==
- Iridostoma catatella - Viette, 1956
- Iridostoma diana - Bradley, 1957
- Iridostoma ichthyopa - Meyrick, 1909
