= Scythropites =

Scientific classification
- Kingdom: Animalia
- Phylum: Arthropoda
- Class: Insecta
- Order: Lepidoptera
- Family: Yponomeutidae
- Genus: Scythropites; Rebel, 1936

Species
- See text

Genus of moths

Scythropites is a genus of moths of the family Yponomeutidae.

== Species ==
- Scythropites balticella - Rebel, 1935
