= Callithrinca =

Scientific classification
- Kingdom: Animalia
- Phylum: Arthropoda
- Class: Insecta
- Order: Lepidoptera
- Family: Yponomeutidae
- Genus: Callithrinca; Meyrick, 1913

Type species
- Psecadia evocatella Walker, 1863

Species
- See text

Genus of moths

Callithrinca is a genus of moths of the family Yponomeutidae.

== Species ==
- Callithrinca angoonae - Moriuti, 1982 (from Thailand)
- Callithrinca evocatella - (Walker, 1863) (from Borneo)
- Callithrinca niphopyrrha - Meyrick, 1927 (from Fiji)
- Callithrinca sphendonista - Meyrick, 1927 (from Samoa)
