= Trochastica =

Scientific classification
- Kingdom: Animalia
- Phylum: Arthropoda
- Class: Insecta
- Order: Lepidoptera
- Family: Yponomeutidae
- Genus: Trochastica

Species
- Trochastica albifrenis - Meyrick, 1913; See text

Genus of moths

Trochastica is a monotypic genus of moths of the family Yponomeutidae. Its sole member species is Trochastica albifrenis.
