= Pauridioneura =

Scientific classification
- Kingdom: Animalia
- Phylum: Arthropoda
- Class: Insecta
- Order: Lepidoptera
- Family: Yponomeutidae
- Genus: Pauridioneura

Species
- See text

Genus of moths

Pauridioneura is a genus of moths of the family Yponomeutidae.

== Species ==
- Pauridioneura acrospila - Turner, 1926
