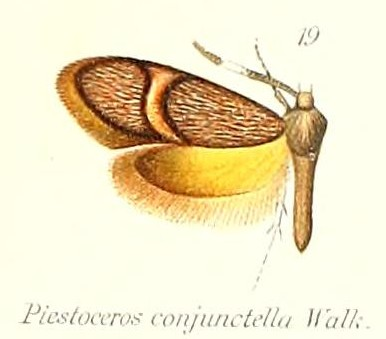
- Piestoceros conjunctella

Scientific classification
- Kingdom: Animalia
- Phylum: Arthropoda
- Class: Insecta
- Order: Lepidoptera
- Family: Yponomeutidae
- Genus: Piestoceros

Species
- See text

= Piestoceros =

Genus of moths

Piestoceros is a genus of moths of the family Yponomeutidae.

== Species ==
- Piestoceros conjunctella - Walker, 1863
