= Toecorhychia =

Scientific classification
- Kingdom: Animalia
- Phylum: Arthropoda
- Clade: Pancrustacea
- Class: Insecta
- Order: Lepidoptera
- Family: Yponomeutidae
- Genus: Toecorhychia; Butler, 1883
- Species: T. cinerea

Binomial name
- Toecorhychia cinerea Butler, 1883

Genus of moths

Toecorhychia is a monotypic genus of moths. The sole species is Toecorhychia cinerea. Although the genus was formerly placed in the family Yponomeutidae, it is currently not placed in any family.

Toecorhychia cinerea was described based on specimens from Las Zorras, Chile. Its wingspan is 27–29 mm (1.1–1.1 in).
