= Sympetalistis =

Scientific classification
- Kingdom: Animalia
- Phylum: Arthropoda
- Class: Insecta
- Order: Lepidoptera
- Family: Yponomeutidae
- Genus: Sympetalistis; Meyrick, 1935
- Species: S. petrograpta

Binomial name
- Sympetalistis petrograpta Meyrick, 1935

Genus of moths

Sympetalistis is a monotypic genus of moths of the family Yponomeutidae. The only species it contains is Sympetalistis petrograpta.
