= Acrataula =

Scientific classification
- Kingdom: Animalia
- Phylum: Arthropoda
- Clade: Pancrustacea
- Class: Insecta
- Order: Lepidoptera
- Family: Yponomeutidae
- Genus: Acrataula
- Species: A. catapachna

Binomial name
- Acrataula catapachna Meyrick, 1921

Genus of moths

Acrataula is a genus of moths of the family Yponomeutidae. It contains only one species Acrataula catapachna.
