= Thyrsotarsa =

Scientific classification
- Kingdom: Animalia
- Phylum: Arthropoda
- Class: Insecta
- Order: Lepidoptera
- Family: Yponomeutidae
- Genus: Thyrsotarsa; Meyrick, 1921
- Species: T. platybyrsa

Binomial name
- Thyrsotarsa platybyrsa Meyrick, 1921

Genus of moths

Thyrsotarsa is a genus of moths of the family Yponomeutidae. It is monotypic and contains only the species Thyrsotarsa platybyrsa.
