= Calamotis =

Scientific classification
- Kingdom: Animalia
- Phylum: Arthropoda
- Clade: Pancrustacea
- Class: Insecta
- Order: Lepidoptera
- Family: Yponomeutidae
- Genus: Calamotis
- Species: C. prophracta

Binomial name
- Calamotis prophracta Meyrick, 1918

Genus of moths

Calamotis is a genus of moths of the family Yponomeutidae.
