= Acmosara =

Scientific classification
- Kingdom: Animalia
- Phylum: Arthropoda
- Clade: Pancrustacea
- Class: Insecta
- Order: Lepidoptera
- Family: Yponomeutidae
- Genus: Acmosara
- Species: A. polyxena

Binomial name
- Acmosara polyxena Meyrick, 1886

Genus of moths

Acmosara is a genus of moths of the family Yponomeutidae found in Australia. It has one species Acmosara polyxena.
