= Aemylurgis =

Scientific classification
- Kingdom: Animalia
- Phylum: Arthropoda
- Class: Insecta
- Order: Lepidoptera
- Family: Yponomeutidae
- Genus: Aemylurgis
- Species: A. xanthoclina

Binomial name
- Aemylurgis xanthoclina Meyrick,1936

Genus of moths

Aemylurgis is a genus of moths of the family Yponomeutidae. It has only one species Aemylurgis xanthoclina from Brazil (Para).
