= Trisophista =

Scientific classification
- Kingdom: Animalia
- Phylum: Arthropoda
- Class: Insecta
- Order: Lepidoptera
- Family: Yponomeutidae
- Genus: Trisophista; Meyrick, 1924

Type species
- Trisophista doctissima Meyrick, 1923

Species
- See text

Genus of moths

Trisophista is a genus of moths of the family Yponomeutidae.

The species of this genus are allied to Hyponomeuta though resembling Ethmia.

== Species ==
- Trisophista doctissima - Meyrick, 1923
- Trisophista pauli - Viette, 1967
