= Iriania =

Scientific classification
- Kingdom: Animalia
- Phylum: Arthropoda
- Class: Insecta
- Order: Lepidoptera
- Family: Yponomeutidae
- Genus: Iriania

Type species
- Iriania mystica Diakonoff, 1955

Species
- See text

Genus of moths

Iriania is a genus of moths of the ermine moth family, Yponomeutidae. The genus was erected in 1955 by Russian-Dutch entomologist Alexey Diakonoff, based on specimens collected during an expedition to Dutch New Guinea. Diakonoff wrote that the genus appeared superficially similar to members of the concealer moth family, Oecophoridae, differing in the venation of the forewing, having a flattened, smooth head, and having short, diverging labial palpi.

== Species ==
There are seven known species of Iriania, all of were described from specimens collected at collecting stations established during the third Archibold Expedition (1938-1939).

- Iriania anisoptera (Diakonoff, 1955) - type specimen collected at 1,200 m (3,900 ft) from Rotan camp.
- Iriania auriflua (Diakonoff, 1955) - type specimen collected at 1,500 m (4,900 ft) from Sigi Camp.
- Iriania lutescens (Diakonoff, 1955) - type specimen collected at 1,500 m (4,900 ft) from Sigi Camp.
- Iriania minor (Diakonoff, 1955) - type specimen collected at 1,200 m (3,900 ft) from Rotan Camp.
- Iriania mystica - Diakonoff, 1955 - type specimen collected at 1,600 m (5,200 ft) from Lower Mist Camp.
- Iriania ochlodes - Diakonoff, 1955 - type specimen collected at 1,500 m (4,900 ft) from Sigi Camp.
- Iriania tricosma (Diakonoff, 1955) - type specimen collected at 800 m (2,600 ft) from Araucaria Camp.
