= Chionaemopsis =

Scientific classification
- Kingdom: Animalia
- Phylum: Arthropoda
- Class: Insecta
- Order: Lepidoptera
- Family: Yponomeutidae
- Genus: Chionaemopsis
- Species: C. quadrifasciatus

Binomial name
- Chionaemopsis quadrifasciatus Cockerell & Le Veque, 1931

Genus of moths

Chionaemopsis is a genus of moths of the family Yponomeutidae. It contains only the species Chionaemopsis quadrifasciatus.
