= Syncerastis =

Scientific classification
- Kingdom: Animalia
- Phylum: Arthropoda
- Clade: Pancrustacea
- Class: Insecta
- Order: Lepidoptera
- Family: Yponomeutidae
- Genus: Syncerastis

Species
- See text

Genus of moths

Syncerastis is a monotypic genus of moths of the family Yponomeutidae. Its sole species is Syncerastis ptisanopa, first described by Meyrick in 1931.
