= Artenacia =

Scientific classification
- Kingdom: Animalia
- Phylum: Arthropoda
- Class: Insecta
- Order: Lepidoptera
- Family: Yponomeutidae
- Genus: Artenacia
- Species: A. jaurella

Binomial name
- Artenacia jaurella Chrétien, 1905

Genus of moths

Artenacia is a genus of moths of the family Yponomeutidae. It contains one species, Artenacia jaurella.
