= Hierodryas =

Scientific classification
- Kingdom: Animalia
- Phylum: Arthropoda
- Clade: Pancrustacea
- Class: Insecta
- Order: Lepidoptera
- Family: Yponomeutidae
- Genus: Hierodryas; Meyrick, 1931
- Species: H. eriochiras

Binomial name
- Hierodryas eriochiras Meyrick, 1931

Genus of moths

Hierodryas is a genus of moths of the family Yponomeutidae. It contains only the species Hierodryas eriochiras.

Hierodryas eriochiras is known from Shillong in Northeast India. The females measure 18–20 mm (0.71–0.79 in).
