= Pseudozelota capito =

Scientific classification
- Kingdom: Animalia
- Phylum: Arthropoda
- Class: Insecta
- Order: Coleoptera
- Suborder: Polyphaga
- Infraorder: Cucujiformia
- Family: Cerambycidae
- Genus: Pseudozelota
- Species: P. capito

Binomial name
- Pseudozelota capito (Pascoe, 1865)

Synonyms
- Cacia capito (Pascoe, 1865); Pseudozelota annamensis Breuning,

Species of beetle

Pseudozelota capito is a species of beetle in the family Cerambycidae. It was described by Francis Polkinghorne Pascoe in 1865. It is known from Malaysia and Borneo.
