= Orencostoma =

Scientific classification
- Kingdom: Animalia
- Phylum: Arthropoda
- Class: Insecta
- Order: Lepidoptera
- Family: Yponomeutidae
- Genus: Orencostoma; Moriuti, 1971

Type species
- Orencostoma bicornigerum Moriuti, 1971

Genus of moths

Orencostoma is a small genus of ermine moths in the family Yponomeutidae. The genus was erected by Sigeru Moriuti in 1971 for the type species O. bicornigerum from Kashmir, India. Two additional species from northern China were described in 2019, expanding the known range of the genus into East Asia.

== Species ==
The following species are currently placed in Orencostoma:

- Orencostoma bicornigerum Moriuti, 1971 – type species; described from Gulmarg, Kashmir (India).
- Orencostoma divulgatum Wang in Lou, Li & Wang, 2019 – described from Mt. Baxian, Tianjin (China).
- Orencostoma semicirculum Wang in Lou, Li & Wang, 2019 – described from Mt. Qian, Anshan (Liaoning, China).

== Distribution ==
Records currently span the western Himalaya (Kashmir) and northern China (Tianjin and Liaoning), based on the original description and subsequent Chinese material.
