= Pseudozelota punctipennis =

Scientific classification
- Kingdom: Animalia
- Phylum: Arthropoda
- Class: Insecta
- Order: Coleoptera
- Suborder: Polyphaga
- Infraorder: Cucujiformia
- Family: Cerambycidae
- Genus: Pseudozelota
- Species: P. punctipennis

Binomial name
- Pseudozelota punctipennis (Schwarzer, 1930)

Synonyms
- Acanthocacia punctipennis Schwarzer, 1930

Species of beetle

Pseudozelota punctipennis is a species of beetle in the family Cerambycidae. It was described by Bernhard Schwarzer in 1930, originally under the genus Acanthocacia.
