= Thyridectis =

Scientific classification
- Kingdom: Animalia
- Phylum: Arthropoda
- Class: Insecta
- Order: Lepidoptera
- Family: Yponomeutidae
- Genus: Thyridectis

Species
- See text

Genus of moths

Thyridectis is a genus of moths of the family Yponomeutidae.

== Species ==
- Thyridectis psephonoma - Meyrick, 1886
