= Parazelota =

Scientific classification
- Kingdom: Animalia
- Phylum: Arthropoda
- Clade: Pancrustacea
- Class: Insecta
- Order: Lepidoptera
- Family: Yponomeutidae
- Genus: Parazelota

Species
- See text

Genus of moths

Parazelota is a genus of moths of the family Yponomeutidae.

== Species ==
- Parazelota dryotoma - Meyrick, 1913
