= Pronomeuta =

Scientific classification
- Kingdom: Animalia
- Phylum: Arthropoda
- Class: Insecta
- Order: Lepidoptera
- Family: Zygaenidae
- Genus: Pronomeuta; Meyrick, 1905

Genus of moths

Pronomeuta is a genus of Burnet Moths in the moth family Zygaenidae. There are at least two described species in Pronomeuta.

== Species ==
These two species belong to the genus Pronomeuta:

- Pronomeuta lemniscata Meyrick, 1922 (Indonesia)
- Pronomeuta sarcopis Meyrick, 1905 (Sri Lanka)
