= Metharmostis =

Scientific classification
- Kingdom: Animalia
- Phylum: Arthropoda
- Class: Insecta
- Order: Lepidoptera
- Family: Cosmopterigidae
- Genus: Metharmostis

Species
- See text

Genus of moths

Metharmostis is a genus of moths of the family Cosmopterigidae. The genus is defined by its distinct forewing pattern featuring two rows of grayish-yellow streaks from base of cell to crossvein, a cluster of long hair-pencils from the base frenulum in males, and divided halves of the seventh sternum bearing a dense cluster of sex scales in females.

One species of the genus Mathamostis multileneata was considered for use as biological control agent for Rhodomyrtus tomentosa in Florida however it was ultimately deemed not sufficiently host-specific.

== Species ==
- Metharmostis asaphaula Meyrick, 1921
- Metharmostis multilineata Adamski, 2014
