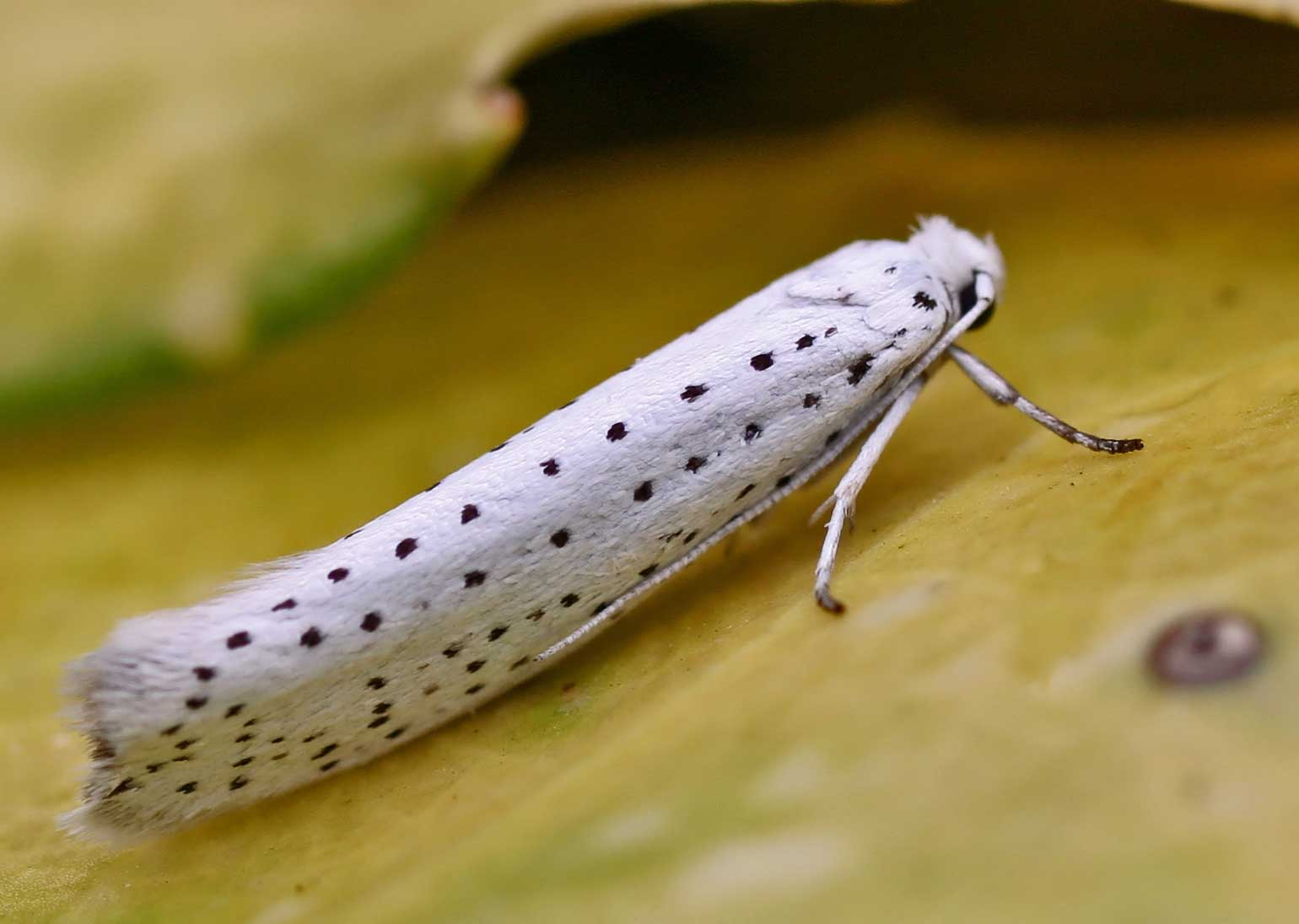
- Yponomeuta evonymella
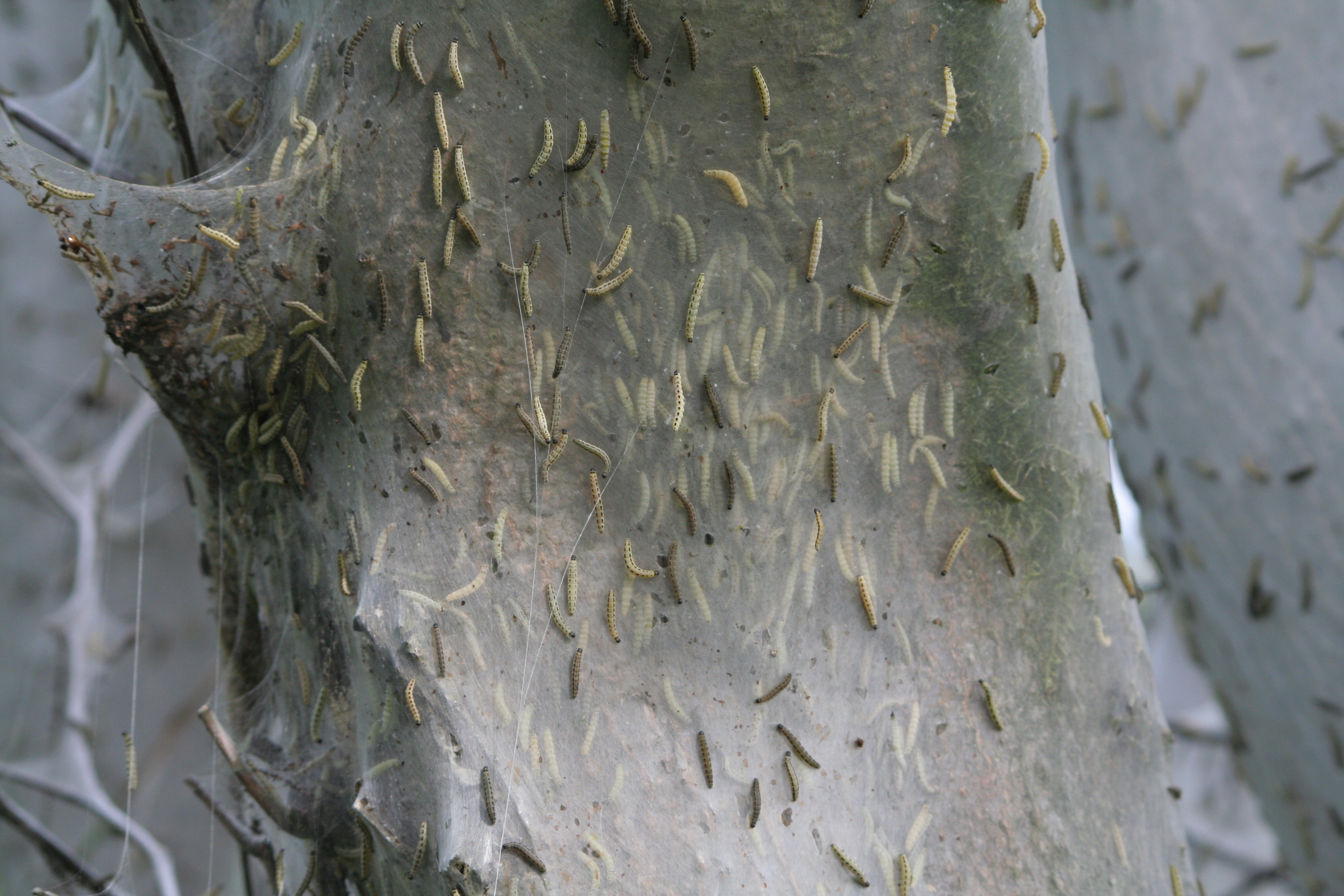
- Communal larval web

Scientific classification
- Kingdom: Animalia
- Phylum: Arthropoda
- Clade: Pancrustacea
- Class: Insecta
- Order: Lepidoptera
- Superfamily: Yponomeutoidea
- Family: Yponomeutidae; Stephens, 1829

Diversity
- 600 species

= Ermine moth =

Family of moths

Certain members of the unrelated snout moths (Pyralidae) are also known as "ermine moths." Spilosoma lubricipeda is an unrelated moth with the common name "white ermine."

An ermine moth is any moth in the family Yponomeutidae, which has several hundred species, most of them in the tropics. The larvae tend to form communal webs, and some are minor pests in agriculture, forestry, and horticulture. Adult moths are minor pollinators.

== Taxonomy ==
The traditional morphology based taxonomy of Kyrki (1990) divided Yponomeutidae into six subfamilies, but this circumscription is not found to be monophyletic in molecular phylogenetic analyses. van Nieukerken et al (2011) split off Praydidae, Attevidae and Argyresthiidae as separate families, and Sohn (2013) elevated Scythropiinae to family to contain Scythropia.

The two remaining subfamilies are:

- Saridoscelinae
- Yponomeutinae

The following genera have not been assigned subfamilies:

- Abacistis
- Acrataula
- Aemylurgis
- Aictis
- Amalthina
- Anaphantis
- Argyresthites
- Artenacia
- Balanoptica
- Betharga
- Buxeta
- Calamotis
- Callithrinca
- Caminophantis
- Chionaemopsis
- Citrinarchis
- Conchiophora
- Coptoproctis
- Cymonympha
- Dascia
- Diaphragmistis
- Entrichiria
- Epactosaris
- Epichthonodes
- Eriopyrrha
- Euarne
- Exanthica
- Exaulistis
- Hesperarcha
- Hierodryas
- Ilychytis
- Iriania
- Iridostoma
- Isotornis
- Ithutomus
- Metanomeuta
- Metharmostis
- Mnemoses
- Mychonoa
- Nematobola
- Nosymna
- Orencostoma
- Oridryas
- Orinympha
- Orthosaris
- Palaetheta
- Parazelota
- Parexaula
- Pauridioneura
- Phasmatographa
- Piestoceros
- Podiasa
- Porphyrocrates
- Pronomeuta
- Protonoma
- Pseudorinympha
- Scythropites
- Syncerastis
- Thyridectis
- Thyrsotarsa
- Toiana
- Trisophista
- Typhogenes

Formerly in Yponomeutidae, currently not assigned to any family:

- Toecorhychia

== Characteristics ==
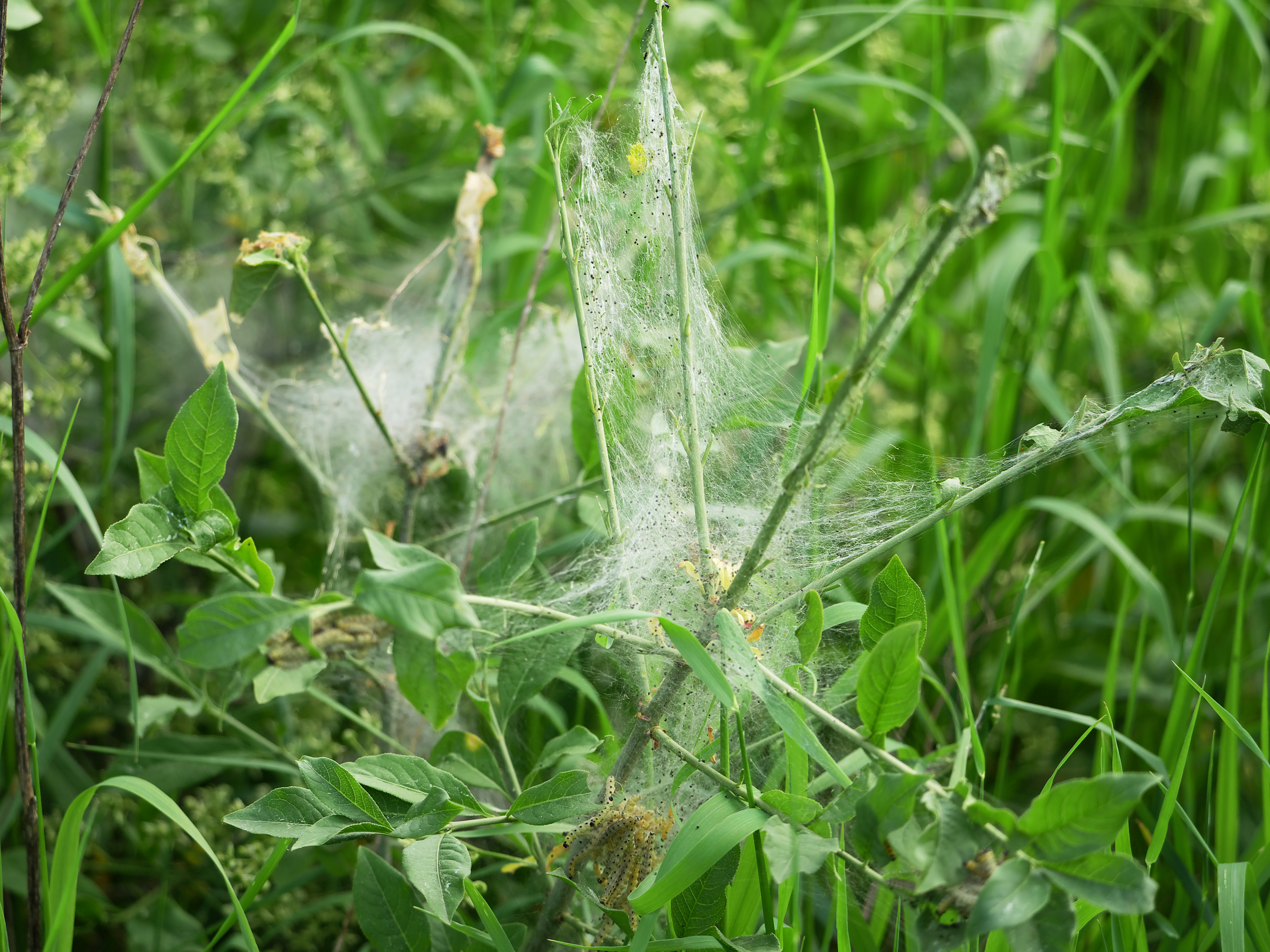
Larvae of Ermine moths at the bottom of their cocoon

Ermine moths are small to medium-sized moths varying in wingspan from 8 to 31 mm (0.3 to 1.2 in). The heads mostly have smooth scales, the haustellum is naked and the labial palps are curved upwards. The maxillary palps usually consist of one or two segments. The wings are long, often with fringes on the trailing edges of the hindwings. The colour is usually white, pale grey or drab, often with many dark speckles.

Adult ermine moths are mostly nocturnal.

The larvae are leaf-webbers, leaf skeletonizers, leafminers or needleminers and are found on a variety of host plants. Some cause economic damage to crops and trees.

== Species (selection) ==
Better-known species include:

- Spindle ermine, Yponomeuta cagnagella
- Bird-cherry ermine, Yponomeuta evonymella
- Orchard ermine, Yponomeuta padella
- Yponomeuta plumbella
- Acmosara polyxena
- Apple ermine Yponomeuta malinellus
- Ailanthus webworm

== Etymology ==
The word Yponomeutidae comes from the Ancient Greek ὑπό (ypo) meaning under and νομός (nomós) meaning food or dwelling, thus "feeding secretly, or burrow".
