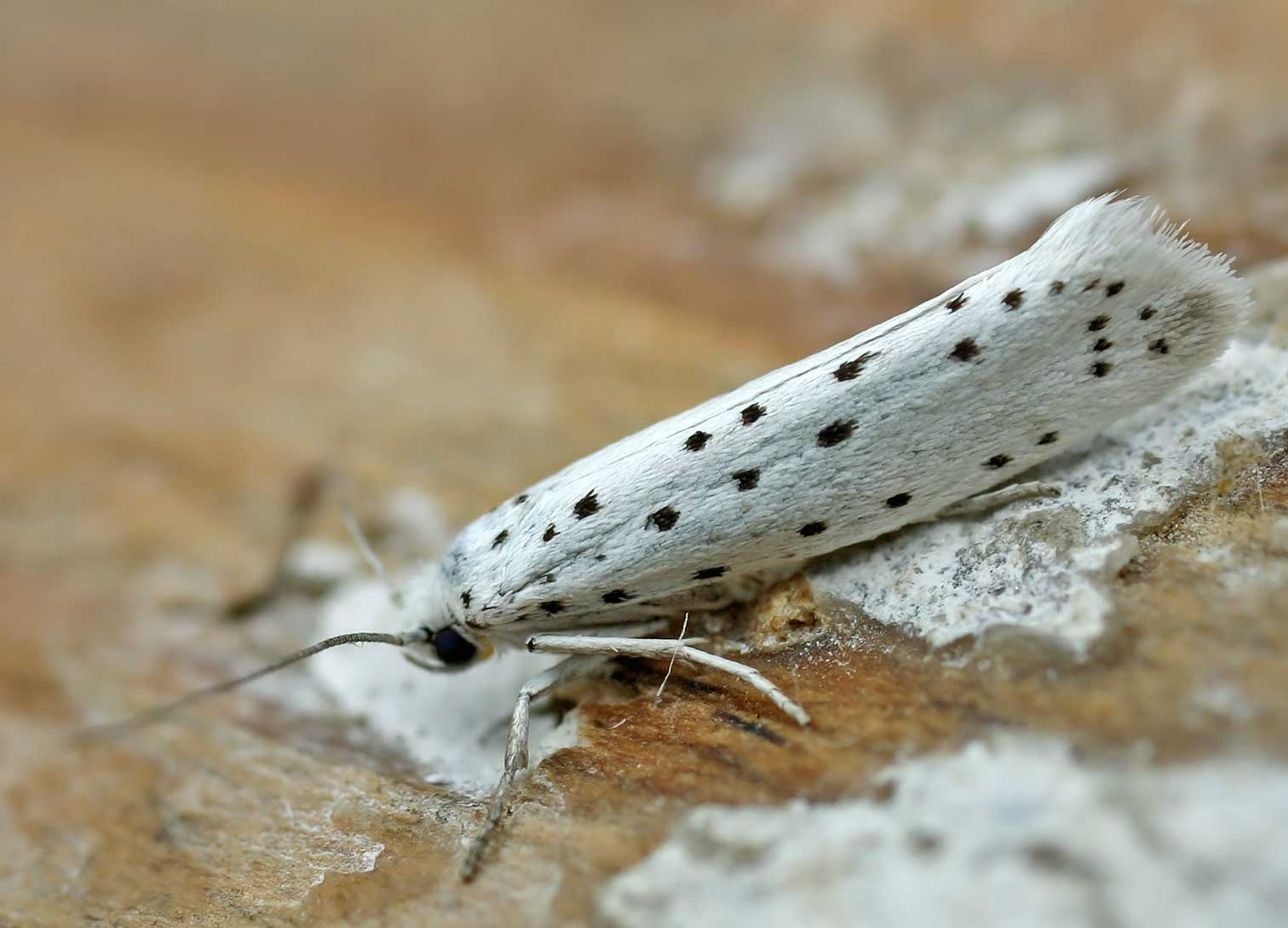

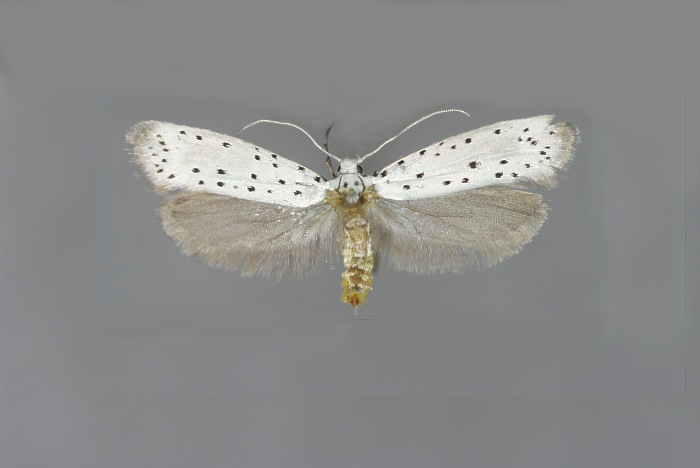

Scientific classification
- Kingdom: Animalia
- Phylum: Arthropoda
- Class: Insecta
- Order: Lepidoptera
- Family: Yponomeutidae
- Genus: Yponomeuta
- Species: Y. padella

Binomial name
- Yponomeuta padella (Linnaeus, 1758)

Synonyms
- Phalaena padella Linnaeus, 1758; Yponomeuta diffluellus Heinemann, 1870 ("Hyponomeuta"); Yponomeuta rhamnellus Gershenson, 1974

= Yponomeuta padella =

Orchard ermine

Species of moth

Yponomeuta padella (orchard ermine) is a lepidopteran from the family Yponomeutidae, the ermine moths. It is also known as the cherry ermine

The wingspan ranges from 19 to 22 millimetres (3/4 to 7/8 in). The head is white. Forewings are light grey, sometimes more or less suffused with white, especially towards dorsum; four longitudinal series of few black dots, first not reaching middle, second beginning beyond extremity of first, lowest including 4-6 dots; some additional black dots before termen; cilia light grey. Hindwings are rather dark grey. The larva is greenish-grey; spots black; head black.

== Biology ==
The flight time ranges from July to August. The moth is attracted to light.

== Host plant ==
The larvae feed on Prunus spinosa, other Prunus spp., Crataegus.

== Distribution ==
Yponomeuta padella is widespread in Europe and can be found in all biotopes where the food plants are found. In the former Soviet Union, it is widespread in the European part in the north up to the Saint Petersburg area. In the east it is distributed in Transcaucasia, southern Kazakhstan, and central Asia. The species was introduced into North America.

In Northern Ireland, Y. padella first appeared when defoliation was observed in hedges of common hawthorn (Crataegus monogyna) and blackthorn (Prunus spinosa) in 1972. Up to this point, there was no record of Y. padella, although Y. malinellus occurred locally. In parts of the Republic of Ireland, the distribution of Y. padella reached epidemic proportions within 30 years. In a period of 10 years, the species colonized an area of more than 600 square kilometres (230 sq mi) and is still spreading. Within this area, populations appeared random, most hedges were uninfested, while in infested areas populations persisted for many years.

Y. padella is introduced to North America, first found in British Columbia and then Washington.

== Similar species ==
Y. padella is part of a complex of species whose representatives can only be distinguished from similar species with great difficulty, even with genital examinations.From Yponomeuta malinellus it is most easily distinguished by the host plant, but even that is not always reliable. Usually the grayish fringed scales distinguish the Y. padella from Yponomeuta malinellus, while the greyish pollination of the forewings distinguishes it from Yponomeuta cagnagella. In Yponomeuta rorella (Hübner, 1796), the greyish pollination has a slightly different structure. According to Povel 1984, the number of antennae segments can be used for differentiation. Y. padella has 51 to 57, Y. malinellus 50 to 56 and Y. cagnagella 56 to 65 antennal segments. The complex also includes Yponomeuta evonymella.

== Taxonomy ==
Both Yponomeuta diffluellus Heinemann, 1870 and Yponomeuta rhamnellus Gershenson, 1974 were treated as valid species by Gershenson and Ulenberg in 1998, but most authors regard them as synonyms of Yponomeuta padella.

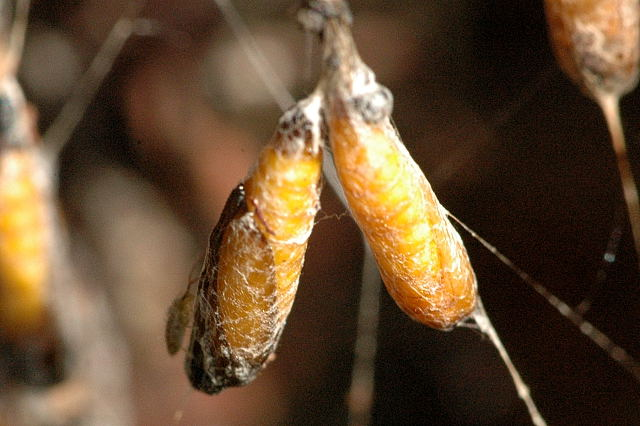
Pupae

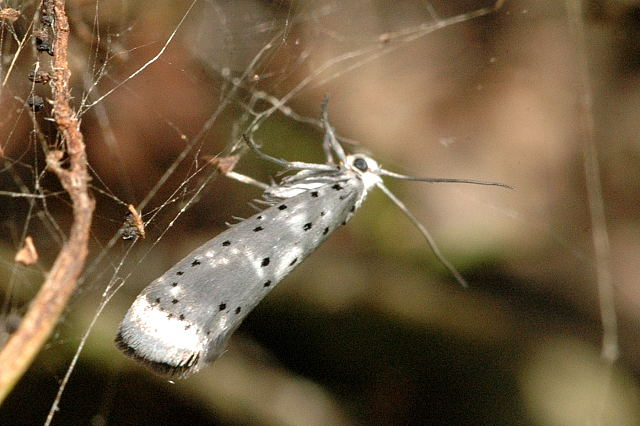

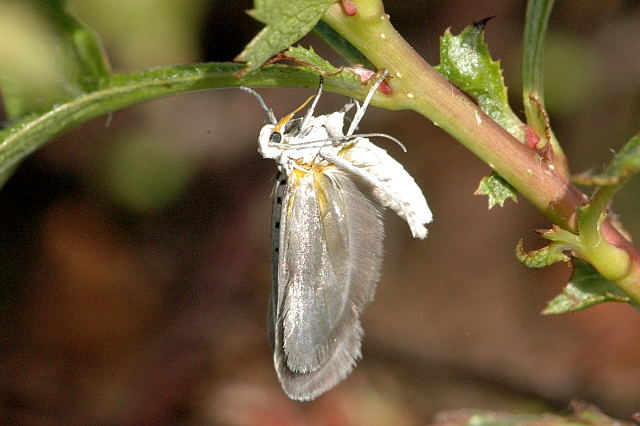

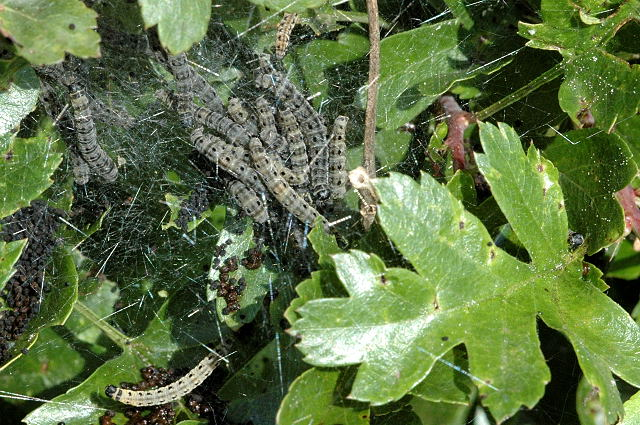
Caterpillars

In a few weeks the hedge is green again
