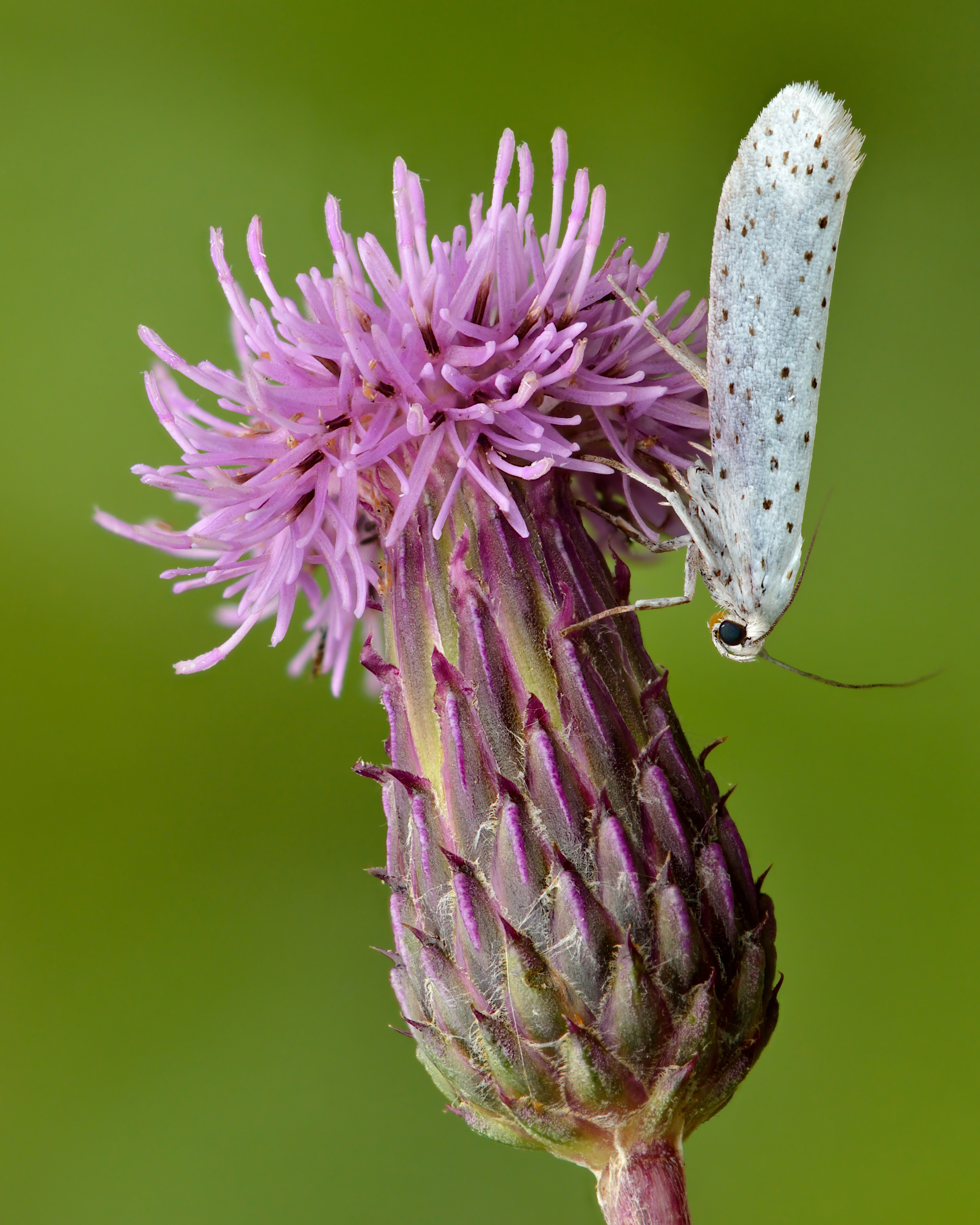

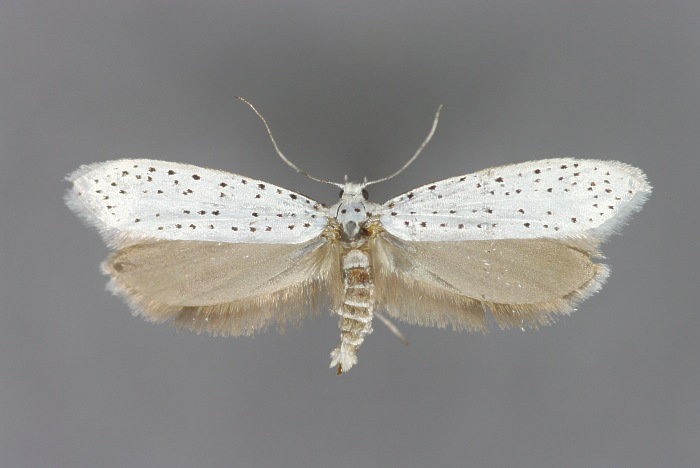

Scientific classification
- Kingdom: Animalia
- Phylum: Arthropoda
- Class: Insecta
- Order: Lepidoptera
- Family: Yponomeutidae
- Genus: Yponomeuta
- Species: Y. evonymella

Binomial name
- Yponomeuta evonymella (Linnaeus, 1758)

Synonyms
- Hyponomeuta padi Zeller, 1844; Phalaena evonymella Linnaeus, 1758; Yponomeuta evonymellus (Linnaeus, 1758)

= Bird-cherry ermine =

Species of moth

The bird-cherry ermine (Yponomeuta evonymella) is a species of moth in the family Yponomeutidae, the ermine moths. The wingspan of the moth ranges from 16 to 25 mm. The insect was first described in 1758 by the Swedish naturalist Carl Linnaeus who gave it the name Phalaena evonymella; it was later transferred to the genus Yponomeuta, becoming Yponomeuta evonymella. The moth can be found in almost the whole of Europe and the northern and eastern part of Asia.

== Description ==
The adult bird-cherry ermine is a distinctive moth with a wingspan of between 16 and 25 mm (0.6 and 1.0 in). The forewings are white with five longitudinal rows of small black spots. The hind wings are a smoky brown colour, with a dark edging. They are wider and shorter than the forewings. The fine, thread-like antennae reach two-thirds of the length of the wings. When the moths are resting, the wings are rolled and placed close to the body, so that the insect looks almost tubular. At the slightest disturbance, the moths skip away and skilfully drop to the ground.

== Distribution and habitat ==
This species may be found in almost the whole of Europe from the river lowlands to the deciduous forest border in alluvial forests, on stream banks with bushes and trees as well as in gardens and parks. Population sizes fluctuate over the years, but mass outbreaks that lead to the devouring of all the foliage on the tree are not uncommon.

== Ecology ==
The host plant of the bird-cherry ermine is the bird cherry, but occasionally the caterpillars are found on cherry or buckthorn. The females lay their eggs on the winter buds. The young caterpillars overwinter underneath the bud scales and become active when the buds burst in spring. The larvae feed until the end of May or early June and then pupate in tightly packed communal webs on the trunk or among the herbaceous plants below. Because the caterpillars are concealed inside an extensive web-like nest, they can eat a whole tree bare unhindered, although it is likely that the trees will survive, with reduced growth in the following growth seasons. They seem to have few predators, but their numbers are reduced as a result of attacks by parasitic wasps.

The adult insects are nocturnal and their flight time ranges from July to August. They feed on nectar and are attracted to lights.

== Usage of the nets in Cobweb Paintings ==
Other than the name suggests, cobweb paintings used webs of ermine moths as canvas, not actually spider webs.

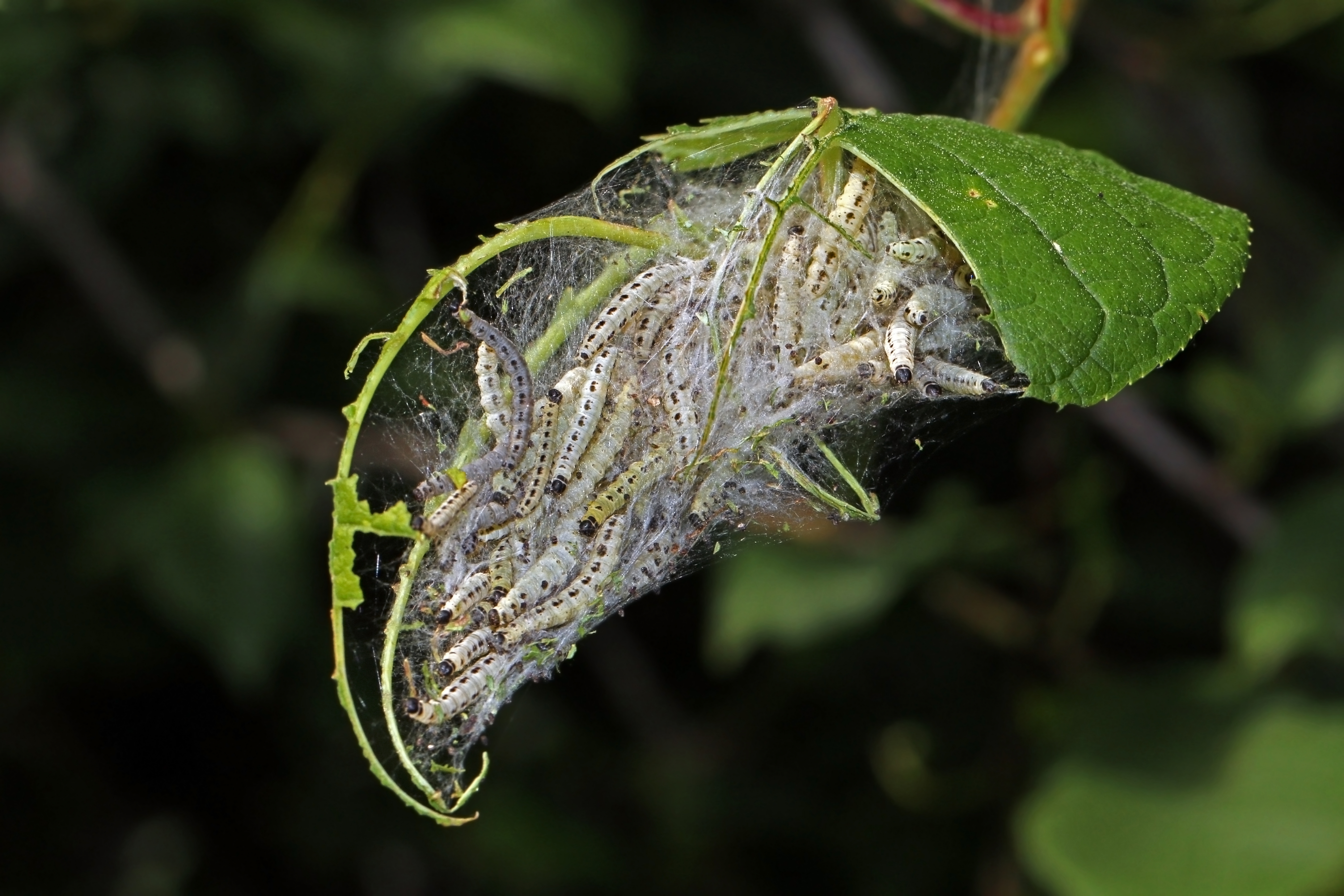
Caterpillars in nest

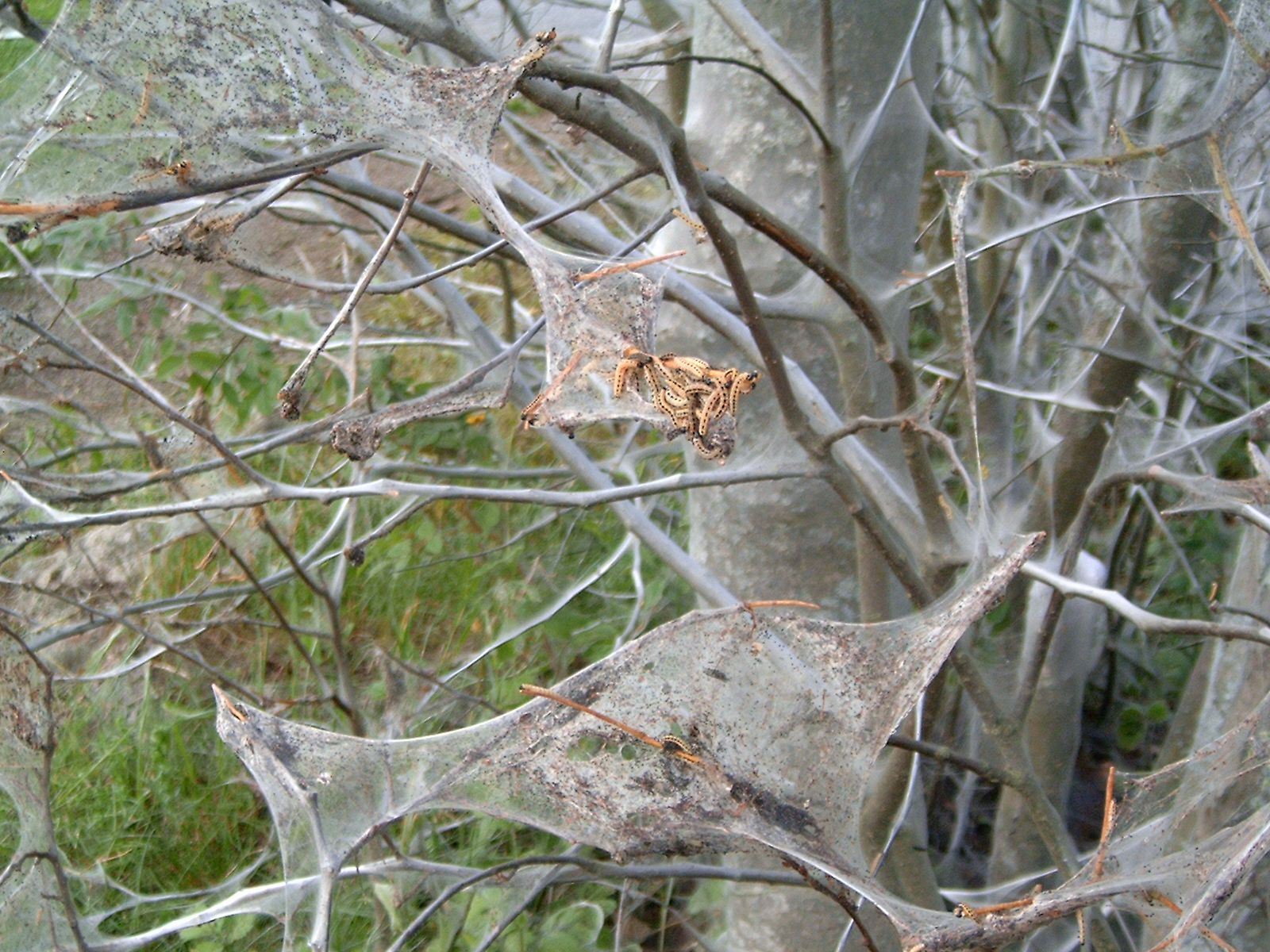
Damage done by the caterpillars

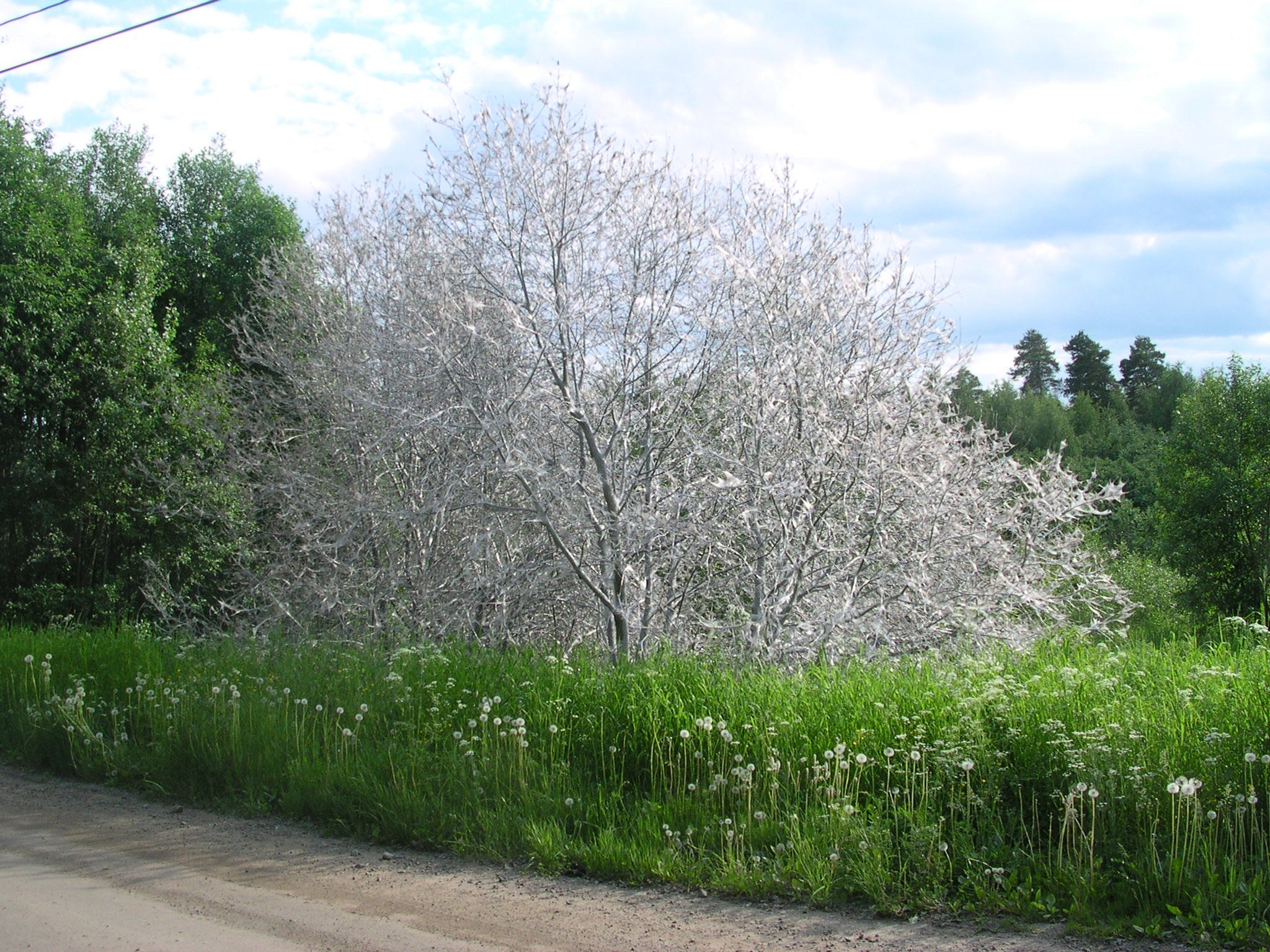
Tree stripped of foliage and covered in caterpillar silk

Similar species (also destructive pests):

- Cherry or orchard ermine, Yponomeuta padella (CEM)
- Apple ermine Yponomeuta malinellus (AEM)
