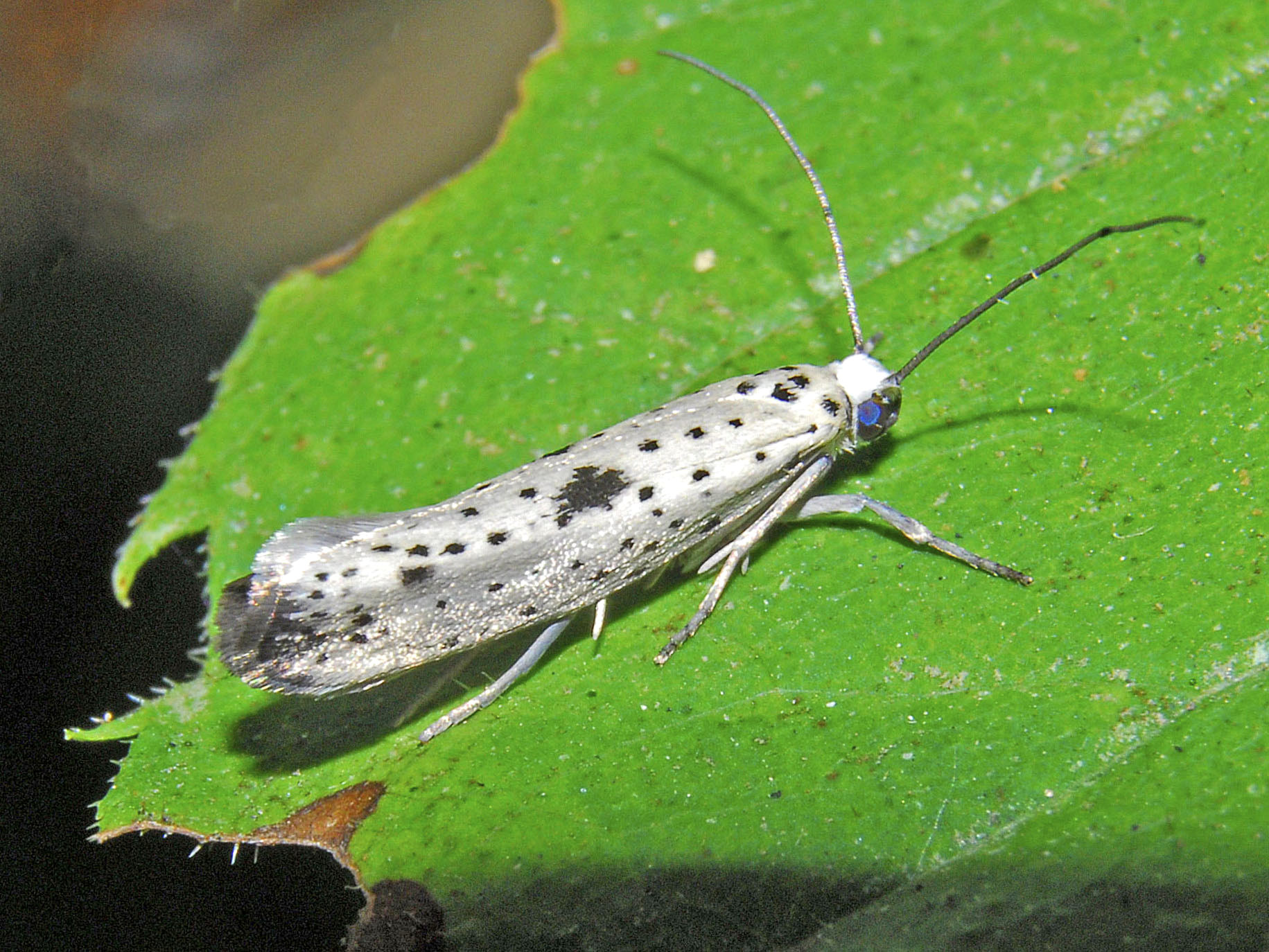
- Moth of Yponomeuta plumbella

Scientific classification
- Domain: Eukaryota
- Kingdom: Animalia
- Phylum: Arthropoda
- Class: Insecta
- Order: Lepidoptera
- Family: Yponomeutidae
- Genus: Yponomeuta
- Species: Y. plumbella

Binomial name
- Yponomeuta plumbella (Denis & Schiffermüller, 1775)

Synonyms
- Tinea plumbella Denis & Schiffermuller, 1775; Yponomeuta plumbellus

= Yponomeuta plumbella =

Species of moth

Yponomeuta plumbella is a moth from the family Yponomeutidae, the ermine moths.

== Distribution ==
This species is widespread in most of Europe and in Asia Minor.

== Description ==
The wingspan of Yponomeuta plumbella ranges from 16 to 20 millimeters. In the imago the fore wings are white punctuated with three rows of very small black spots (hence the family name of ermine moths) while the hindwings are greyish. These moths are clearly distinguished from related species by the larger black splotch in the middle of the inner rim of the forewing and the black marking at the tip of the forewing. The legs and the long antennae are white.

The larvae are straw-yellow in the first instar, with black spots on the sides. The head is yellow. At the end of its development, the caterpillar can reach a length of 18–20 millimetres (0.71–0.79 in).

== Habitat ==
These moths inhabit fields and parks where the host plant grows.

== Biology ==
Eggs are laid by the female in autumn on twigs and branches. The eggs hatch by releasing tiny caterpillars that at first feed within the shoots of the host plant. The caterpillars then become gregarious. As they grow they gather together and weave webs that may eventually envelop a whole tree. They develop by protecting themselves in these silk webs that constitute a collective nest. There are five larval instars in all.

The larva then forms a pupa. The adults begin to appear in April and May and can be found again in August. There are two generations per year, as it is a bivoltine species. The moths fly at night and are attracted to light.

The host plant of this moth is the European spindle (Euonymus europaeus). Other ermine moths that use this plant as their host are Yponomeuta cagnagella and Yponomeuta irrorella.

== Gallery ==
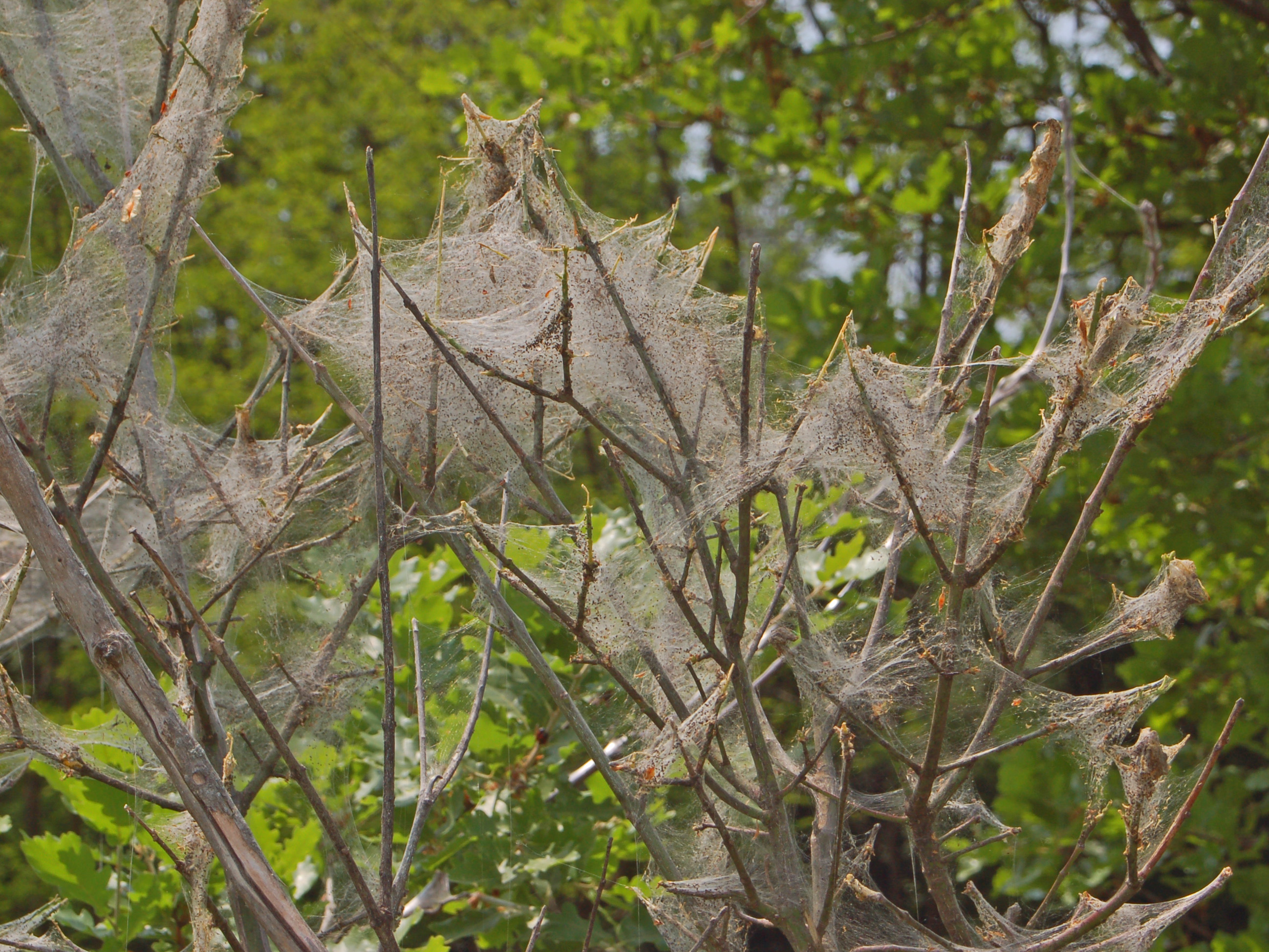
Collective nests

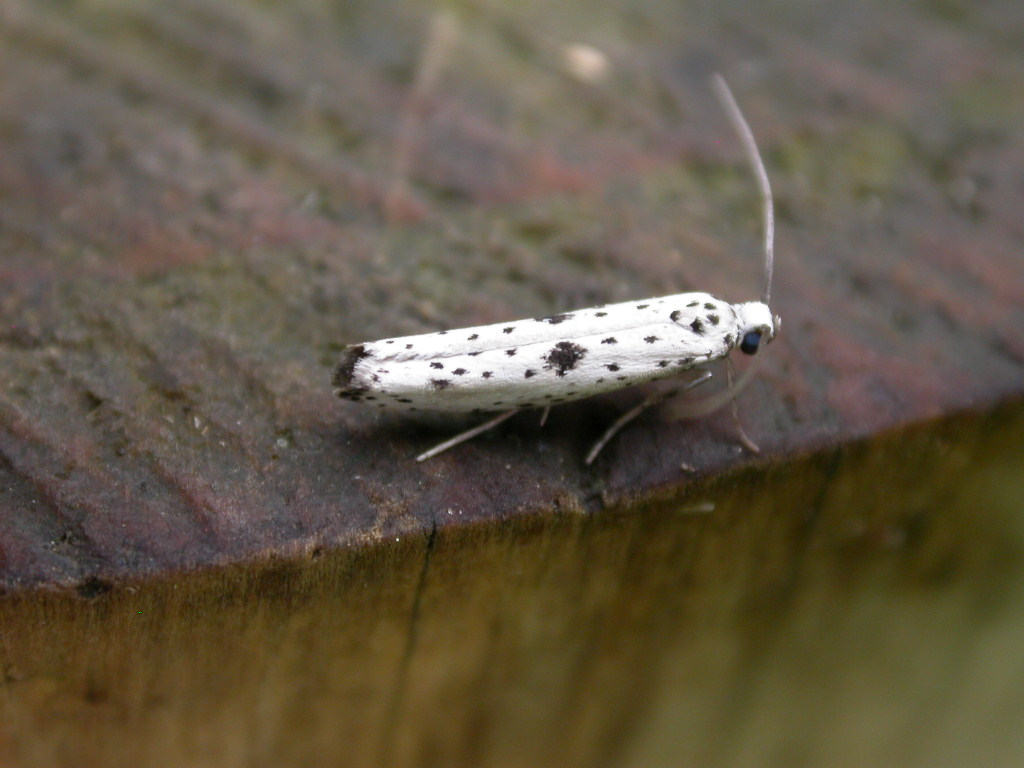
Dorsal view

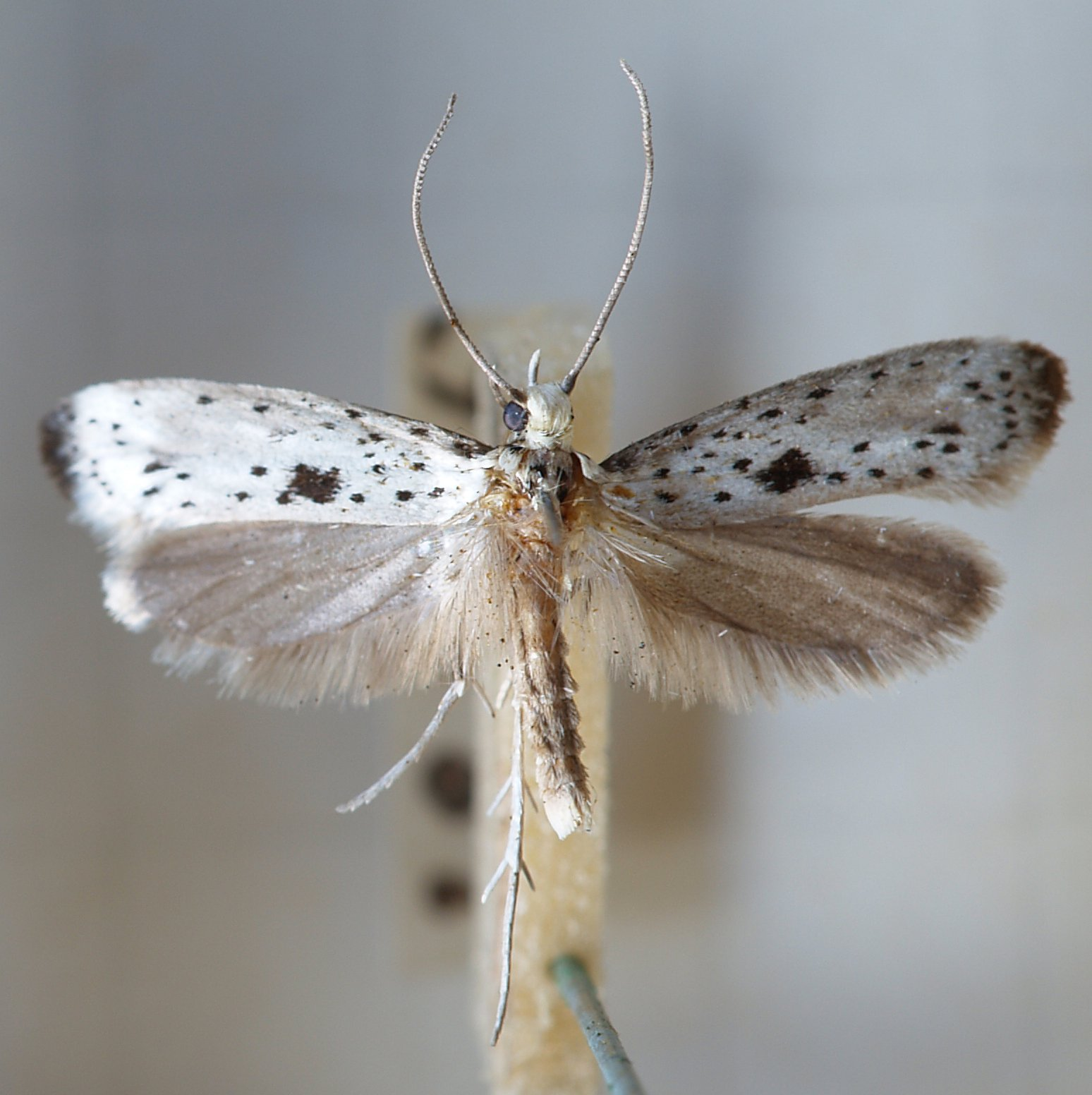
Mounted specimen
