= Yponomeuta mahalebella =

Scientific classification
- Kingdom: Animalia
- Phylum: Arthropoda
- Class: Insecta
- Order: Lepidoptera
- Family: Yponomeutidae
- Genus: Yponomeuta
- Species: Y. mahalebella

Binomial name
- Yponomeuta mahalebella Guenee, 1845

Species of moth

Yponomeuta mahalebella is a moth of the family Yponomeutidae. It is found in France, Italy and Ukraine.

The larvae feed on Prunus mahaleb.

== Taxonomy ==
Many authors regard Yponomeuta mahalebella as a form of Yponomeuta padella.
