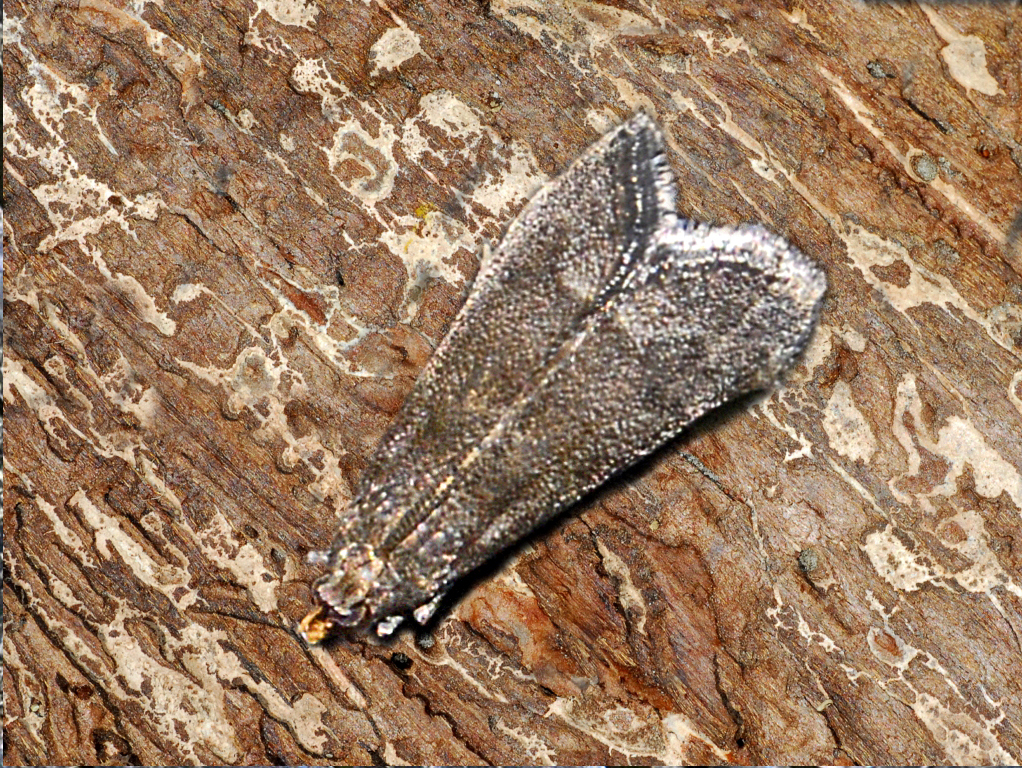
- Eccopisa effractella

Scientific classification
- Kingdom: Animalia
- Phylum: Arthropoda
- Clade: Pancrustacea
- Class: Insecta
- Order: Lepidoptera
- Family: Pyralidae
- Subfamily: Phycitinae
- Genus: Eccopisa; Zeller, 1848
- Species: E. effractella

Binomial name
- Eccopisa effractella Zeller, 1848

Synonyms
- Euzophera homoeosomella Zeller, 1881

= Eccopisa =

Genus of moths

Eccopisa is a genus of snout moths. It was described by Philipp Christoph Zeller in 1848.

== Species ==
The genus Eccopisa is monotypic. It contains only the following species:

- Eccopisa effractella Zeller, 1848

== Etymology ==
The species name effractella derives from Latin effractus, meaning “broken out”.

== Distribution and habitat ==
This species is present in most of Europe, including British Islands and except Fennoscandia, Ireland and Estonia. The distribution extends from west Portugal, across Central, Southern and Eastern Russia. In the south the area extends to Italy and Greece. These moths mainly occur in cultivated areas of gardens and parks.

== Description ==
Eccopisa effractella can reach a wingspan of 14–16.5 mm (0.55–0.65 in). This species shows brown forewings, black or dark brown eyes and yellowish labial palps. The hind wings are pale brown. In the male, there is a cutout in half of the front edge of the hind wing.

== Biology ==
Adults fly from mid May to October, with one to two generations, depending on the location. These moths are nocturnal. The phytophagous larvae live in groups of 7/8 specimens in spun leaves of various deciduous trees. Main host plants include Malus sylvestris, Euonymus europaeus, Prunus padus, Salix and Corylus. They feed also on big-leaved lupine (Lupinus polyphyllus) and on Yponomeuta species. Usually they overwinters as a larva in a white cocoon and pupation occurs in the next spring. However pupae were found sporadically in winter in oak and willow galls.

== Bibliography ==
- Comstock, J. H. 1880: Report of the Entomologist. – Annual Report of the Commissioner of Agriculture 1879: 185-348.
- Corley, M. F. V., Marabuto, E. & Pires, P - New Lepidoptera for the fauna of Portugal (Insecta: Lepidoptera). in SHILAP Revista de Lepidopterologia 35(139), 321-334. 2007
- Ivinskis, P. - Check-list of Lithuanian Lepidoptera. in Vilnius, 210 pp. 1993
- Sinev, S.Yu. - Family Phycitidae. in In: G. S. Medvedev (ed.), Keys to the Insects of the European Part of the USSR 4 (3): 251-340. [In Russian - English translation 1997]. 1986
- Zeller, P. C. 1839: Versuch einer naturgemäßen Eintheilung der Schaben. – Isis von Oken, Leipzig [32] (3): 167–219.
