= Yponomeuta meridionalis =

Scientific classification
- Domain: Eukaryota
- Kingdom: Animalia
- Phylum: Arthropoda
- Class: Insecta
- Order: Lepidoptera
- Family: Yponomeutidae
- Genus: Yponomeuta
- Species: Y. meridionalis

Binomial name
- Yponomeuta meridionalis Gershenson, 1972

Species of moth

Yponomeuta meridionalis is a moth of the family Yponomeutidae. It is found in Tajikistan and is also recorded from the Levant.

Larvae have been recorded on Crataegus korolkowii, Crataegus songarica and Crataegus turkestanica.
