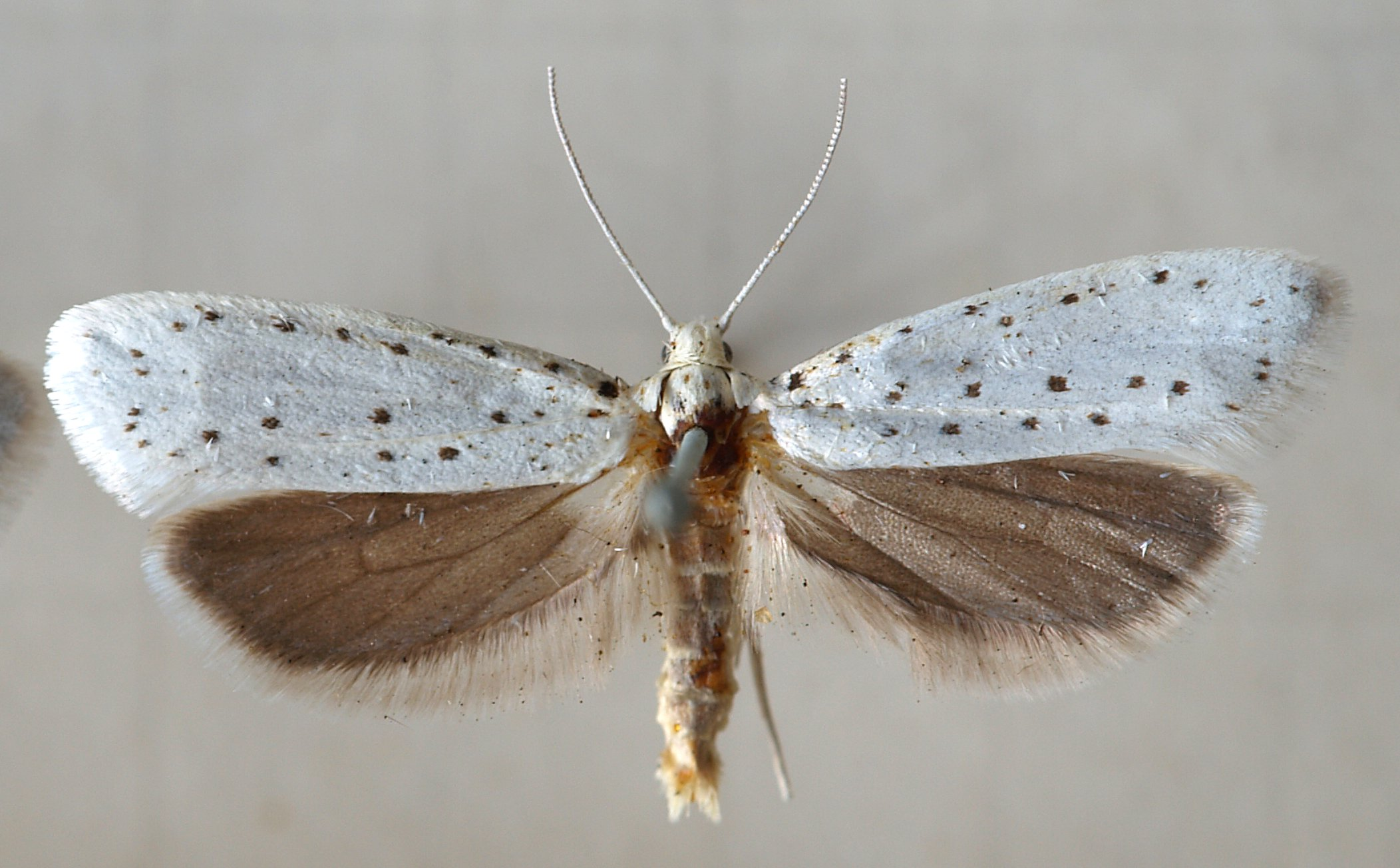

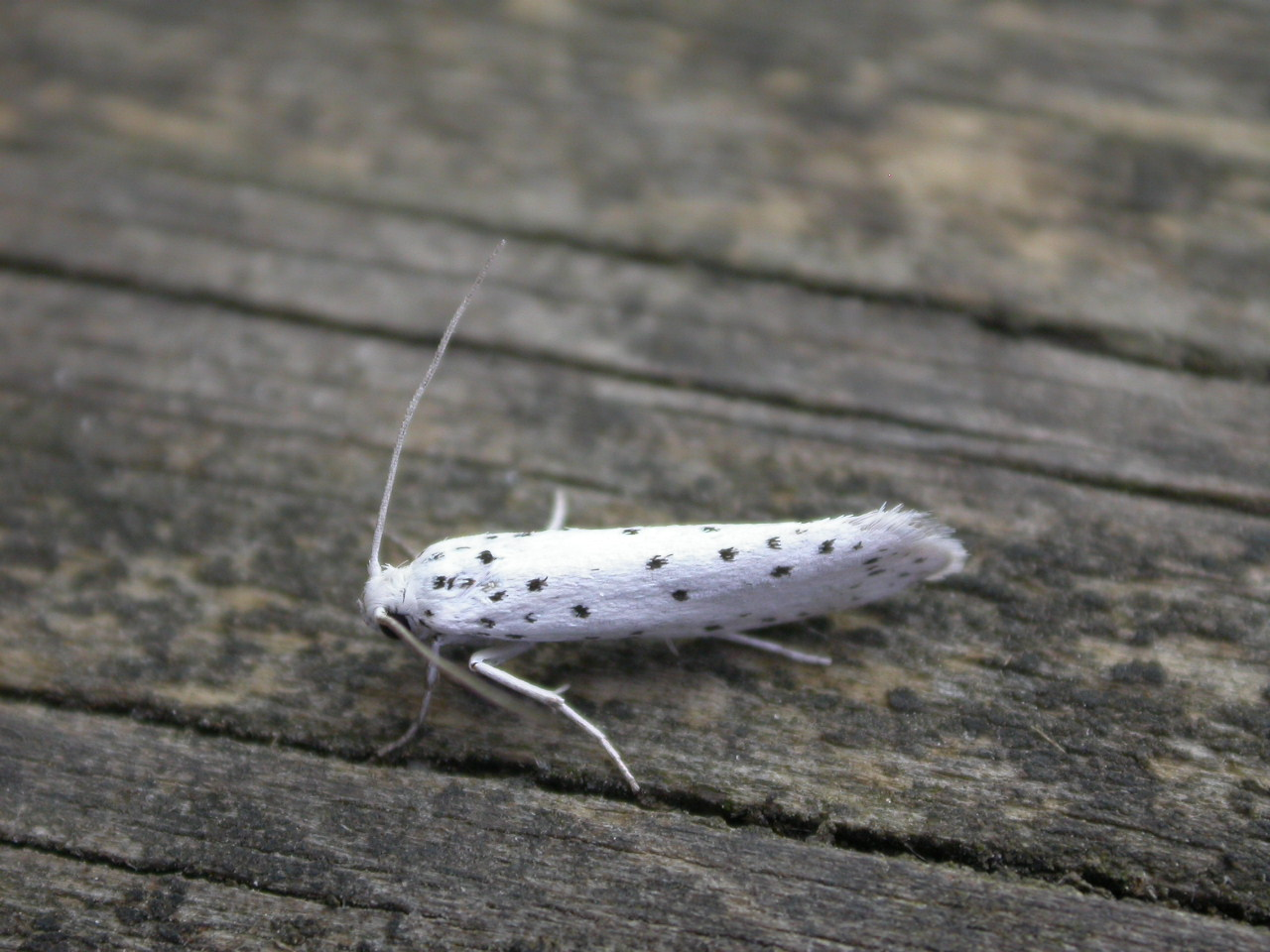

Scientific classification
- Kingdom: Animalia
- Phylum: Arthropoda
- Clade: Pancrustacea
- Class: Insecta
- Order: Lepidoptera
- Family: Yponomeutidae
- Genus: Yponomeuta
- Species: Y. cagnagella

Binomial name
- Yponomeuta cagnagella (Hübner, 1813)

Synonyms
- Tinea cagnagella Hubner, 1813; Nygmia cognatella Hubner, 1825; Yponomeuta cagnagellus

= Yponomeuta cagnagella =

Spindle ermine

Species of moth

Yponomeuta cagnagella, the spindle ermine, is a moth from the family Yponomeutidae, the ermine moths. The wingspan of the moth ranges from 19 to 26 millimetres. The head is white. Forewings are white; four longitudinal series of few black dots, first not reaching middle, second beginning near before middle, lowest including 4-7 dots; some additional black dots before termen; cilia white. Hindwings are dark grey. The larva is pale greyish-yellowish; spots black; head black.

Flight time ranges from the end of June to October. The moth is attracted to light.

== Host plant ==
The host plant of this moth is European spindle. Other ermine moths that use this plant as their host are Yponomeuta plumbella and Yponomeuta irrorella.

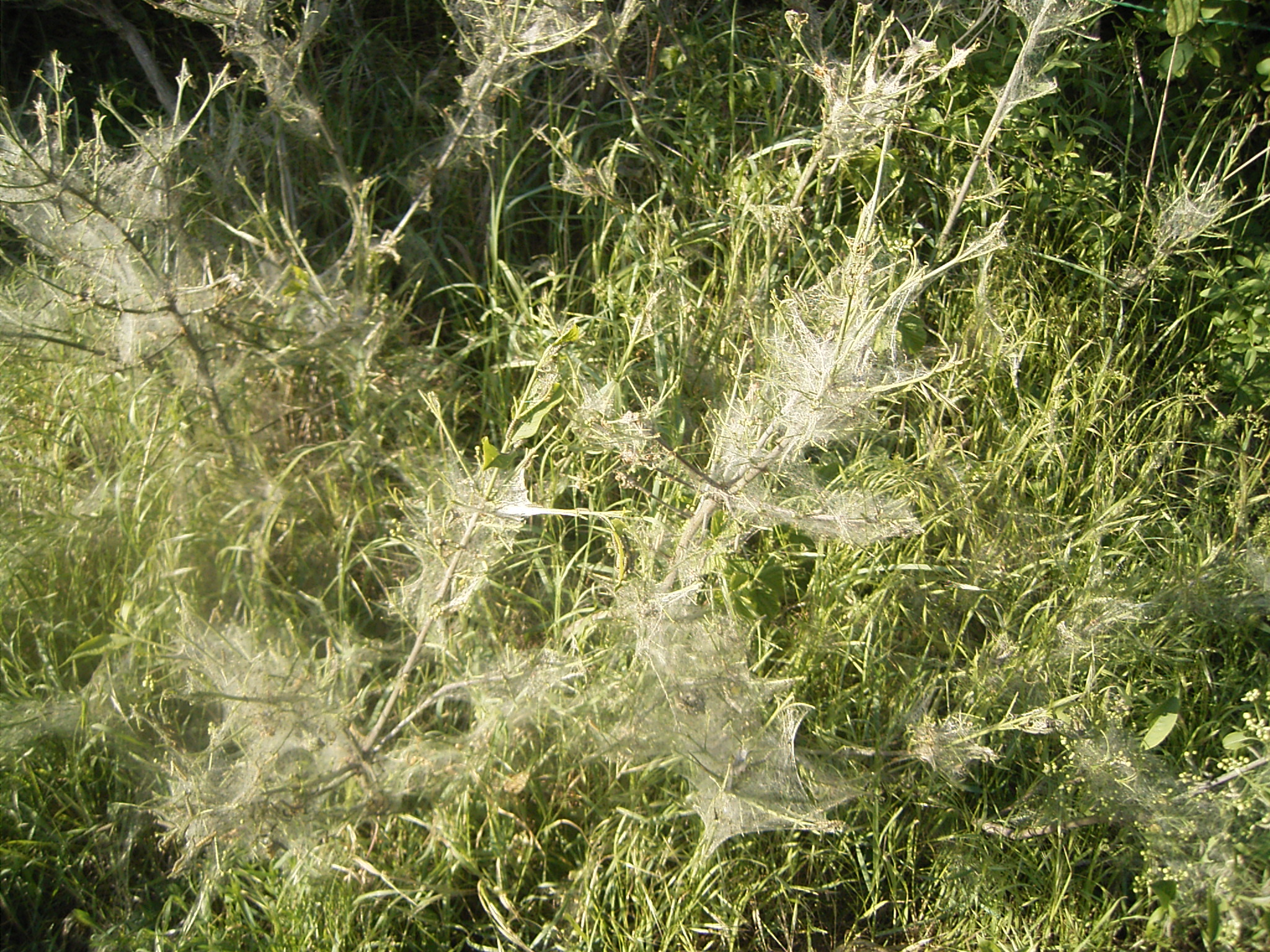
The silk of the larvae of Yponomeuta cagnagellus

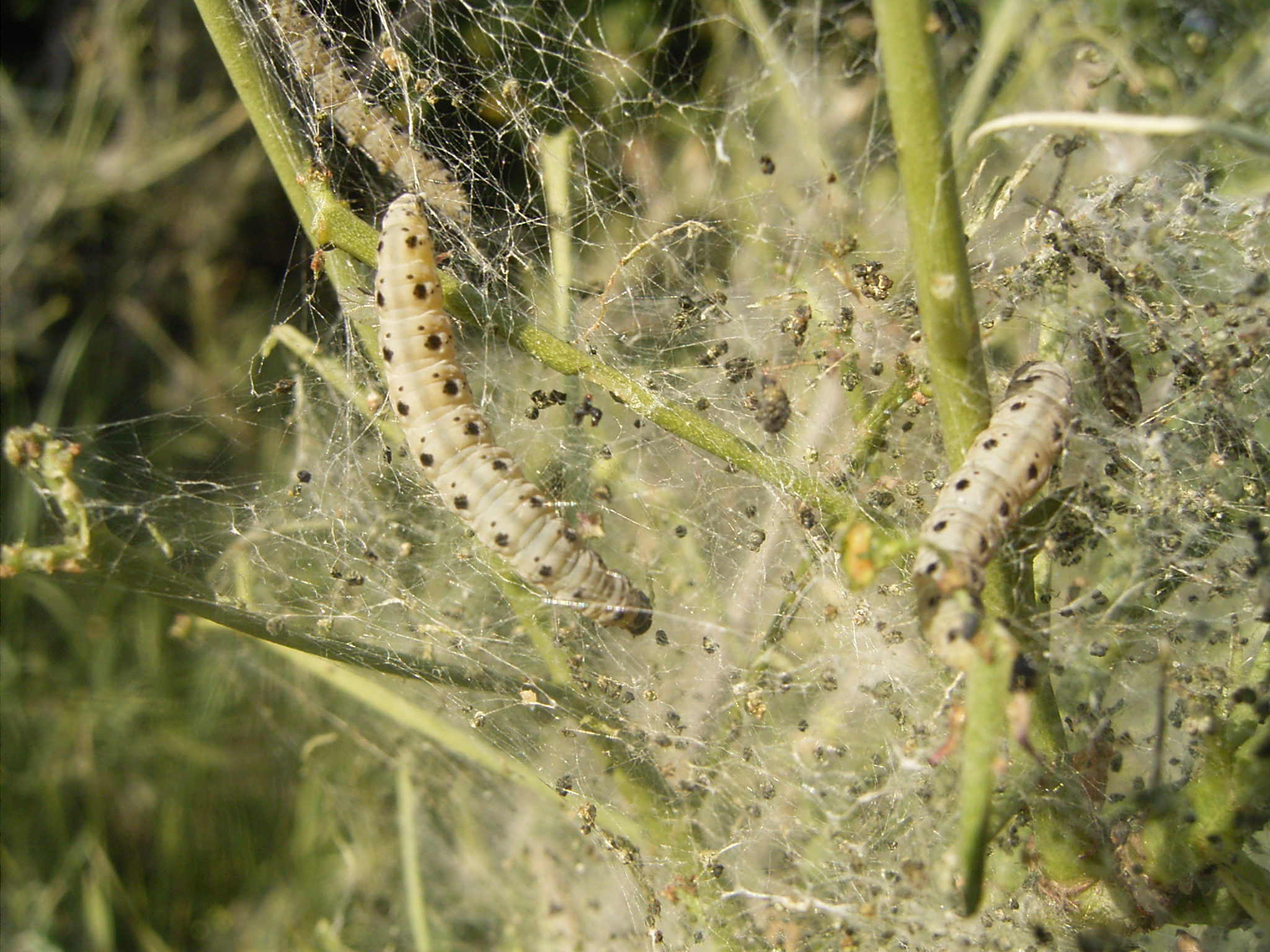
Larvae of Y. cagnagellus

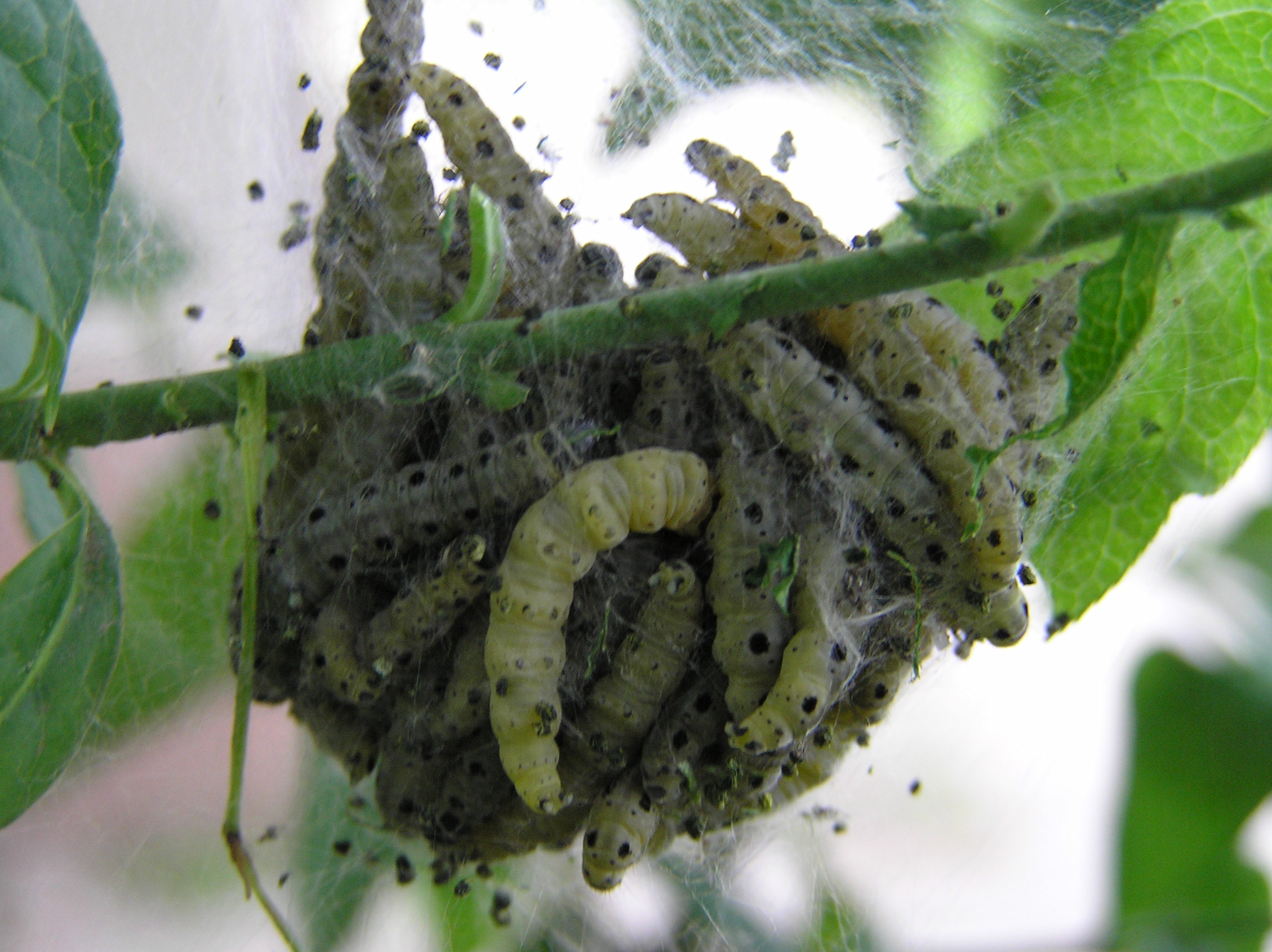
Larvae of Y. cagnagellus

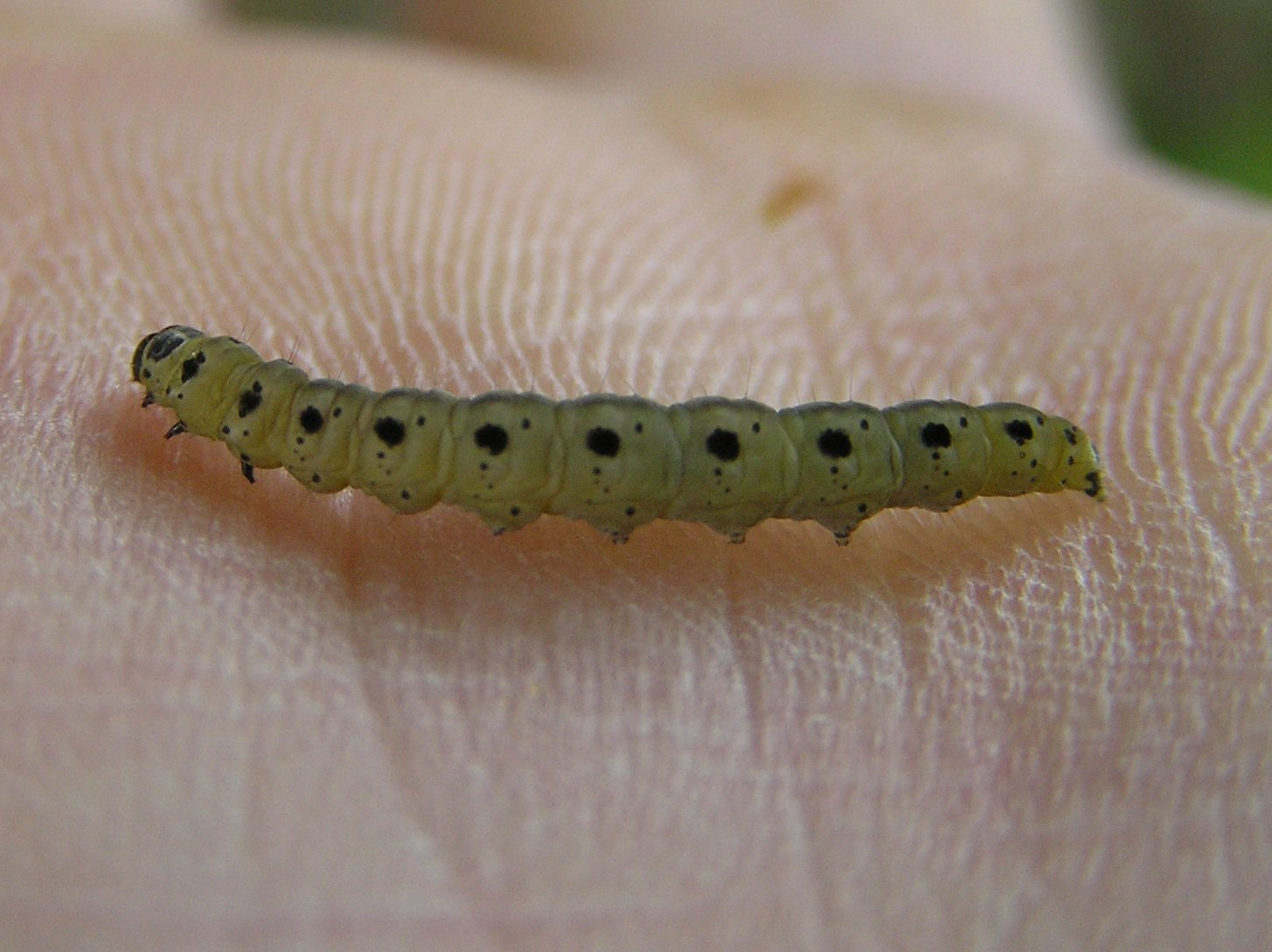
Larva of Y. cagnagellus
