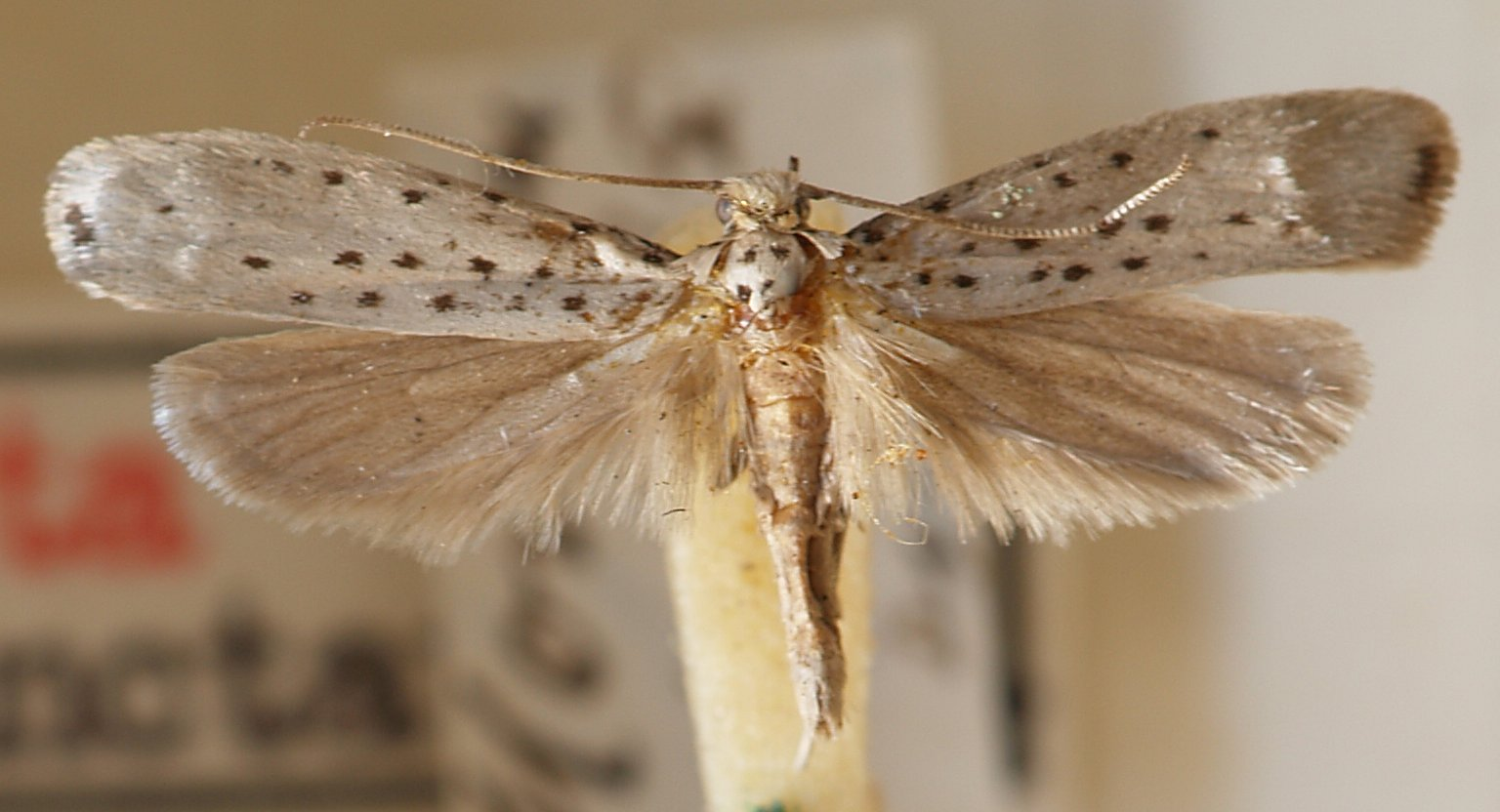

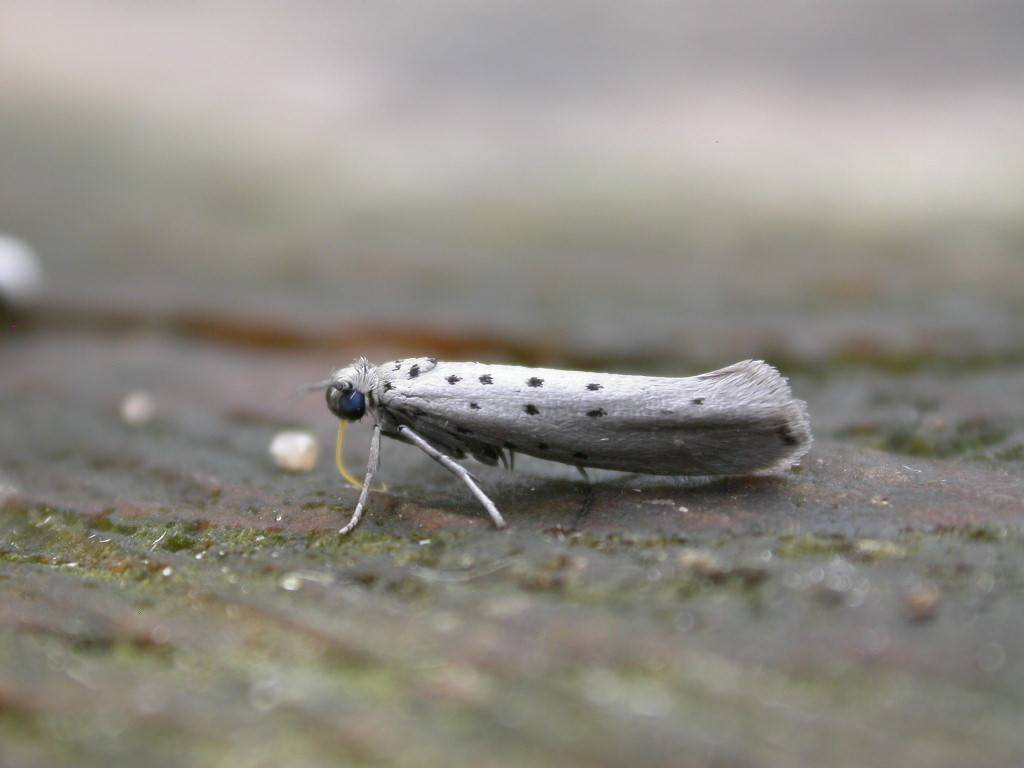

Scientific classification
- Domain: Eukaryota
- Kingdom: Animalia
- Phylum: Arthropoda
- Class: Insecta
- Order: Lepidoptera
- Family: Yponomeutidae
- Genus: Yponomeuta
- Species: Y. sedella

Binomial name
- Yponomeuta sedella Treitschke, 1832

Synonyms
- Phalaena vigintipunctata Retzius, 1783

= Yponomeuta sedella =

Species of moth

Yponomeuta sedella is a moth of the family Yponomeutidae. It is found in Europe.

The wingspan is 16–20 mm. The moth flies in two generations from May to September..

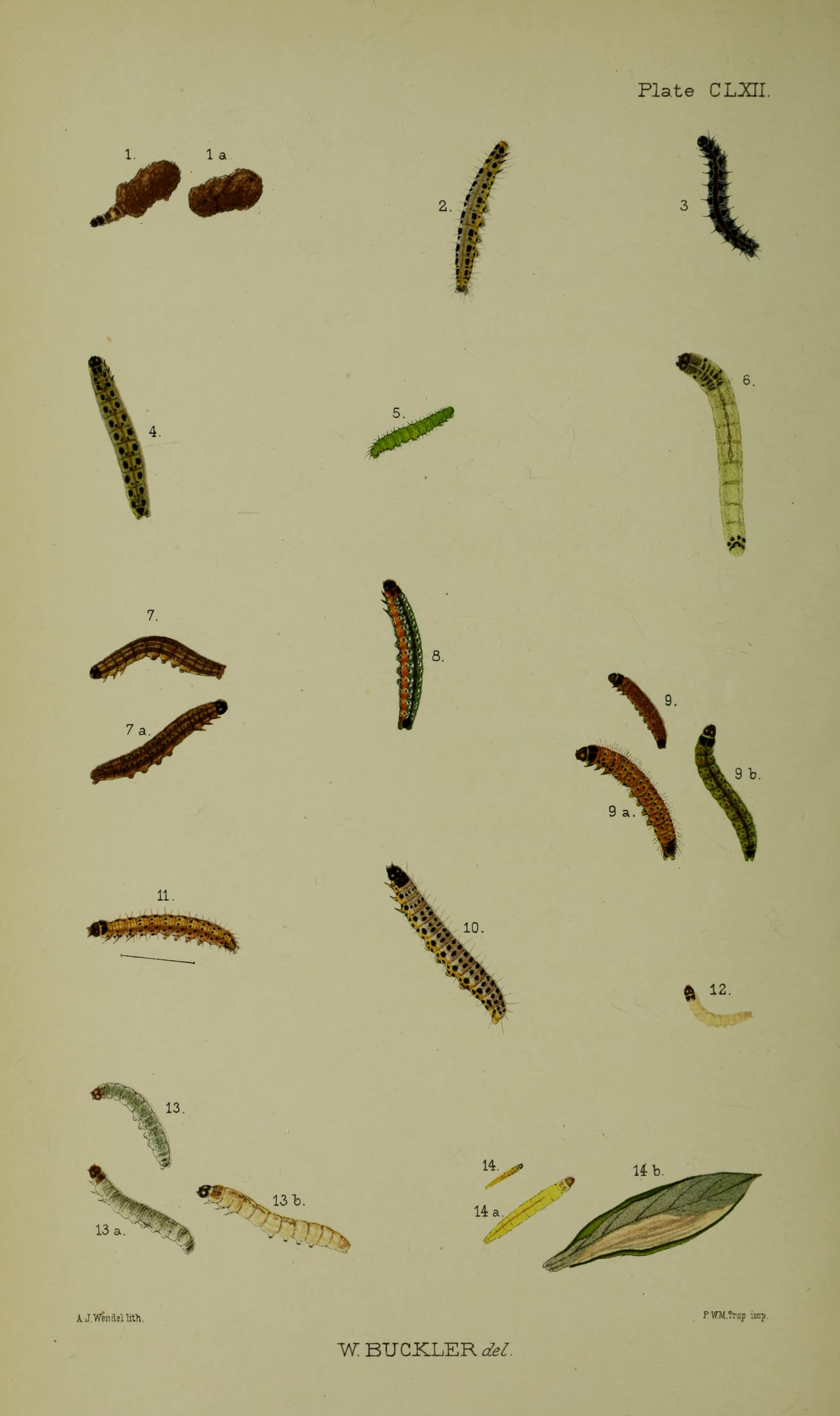
Fig. 2 larva after final moult

The larvae feed on Hylotelephium telephium and other Sedum species.

== Notes ==
1. The flight season refers to Belgium and the Netherlands. This may vary in other parts of the range.
