= Yponomeuta madagascariensis =

Scientific classification
- Domain: Eukaryota
- Kingdom: Animalia
- Phylum: Arthropoda
- Class: Insecta
- Order: Lepidoptera
- Family: Yponomeutidae
- Genus: Yponomeuta
- Species: Y. madagascariensis

Binomial name
- Yponomeuta madagascariensis Gershenson, 2003

Species of moth

Yponomeuta madagascariensis is a moth of the family Yponomeutidae. It is only known from Madagascar.

The wingspan is about 18 mm.
