= Yponomeuta internella =

Scientific classification
- Kingdom: Animalia
- Phylum: Arthropoda
- Class: Insecta
- Order: Lepidoptera
- Family: Yponomeutidae
- Genus: Yponomeuta
- Species: Y. internellus

Binomial name
- Yponomeuta internellus (Walker, 1863)

Synonyms
- Hyponomeuta internellus Walker, 1863

Species of moth

Yponomeuta internellus is a moth of the family Yponomeutidae. It is found in southern Queensland and in New South Wales. The scientific name of this species was published in 1863 by Francis Walker.

The wingspan is about 20 mm.

The larvae feed on Cassine australis. They live communally in a silken web on their food plant.
