= Yponomeuta myriosema =

Scientific classification
- Domain: Eukaryota
- Kingdom: Animalia
- Phylum: Arthropoda
- Class: Insecta
- Order: Lepidoptera
- Family: Yponomeutidae
- Genus: Yponomeuta
- Species: Y. myriosema

Binomial name
- Yponomeuta myriosema (Turner, 1898)

Synonyms
- Hyponomenta myriosema Turner, 1898

Species of moth

Yponomeuta myriosema is a moth of the family Yponomeutidae. It is found in Australia.
