= Yponomeuta paurodes =

Scientific classification
- Domain: Eukaryota
- Kingdom: Animalia
- Phylum: Arthropoda
- Class: Insecta
- Order: Lepidoptera
- Family: Yponomeutidae
- Genus: Yponomeuta
- Species: Y. paurodes

Binomial name
- Yponomeuta paurodes Meyrick, 1907

Synonyms
- Hyponomenta paurocentera Turner, 1898

Species of moth

Yponomeuta paurodes is a moth of the family Yponomeutidae. It is found in Australia in the states of Queensland and New South Wales.

The wingspan is about 20 mm.

The larvae feed on Cassine australis. They live solitarily in a small web on their food plant.
