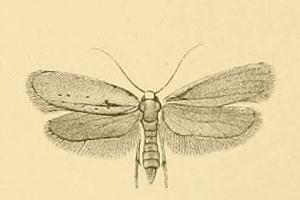

Scientific classification
- Domain: Eukaryota
- Kingdom: Animalia
- Phylum: Arthropoda
- Class: Insecta
- Order: Lepidoptera
- Family: Yponomeutidae
- Genus: Yponomeuta
- Species: Y. gigas

Binomial name
- Yponomeuta gigas (Rebel, 1892)

Synonyms
- Hyponomeuta gigas Rebel, 1892

= Yponomeuta gigas =

Species of moth

Yponomeuta gigas is a moth of the family Yponomeutidae. It is found on the Canary Islands.

The wingspan is 26–28 mm.

The larvae feed on Salix (including Salix canariensis) and Populus species (including Populus alba).
