= Yponomeuta pustulellus =

Scientific classification
- Kingdom: Animalia
- Phylum: Arthropoda
- Class: Insecta
- Order: Lepidoptera
- Family: Yponomeutidae
- Genus: Yponomeuta
- Species: Y. pustulellus

Binomial name
- Yponomeuta pustulellus (Walker, 1863)

Synonyms
- Hyponomeuta pustulellus Walker, 1863; Yponomeuta grossipunctella Guenée, 1879

Species of moth

Yponomeuta pustulellus is a moth of the family Yponomeutidae. Described by Francis Walker in 1863, it is found in Australia.
