= Cobweb painting =

Painting on canvas made from spiderweb

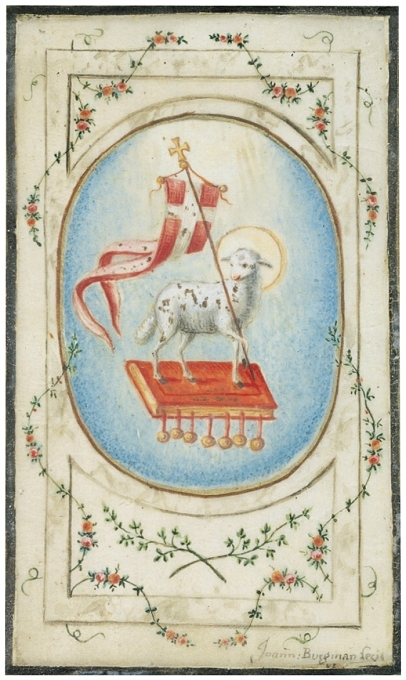
Agnus Dei, Watercolour on caterpillar web by Johann Burgmann, around 1790

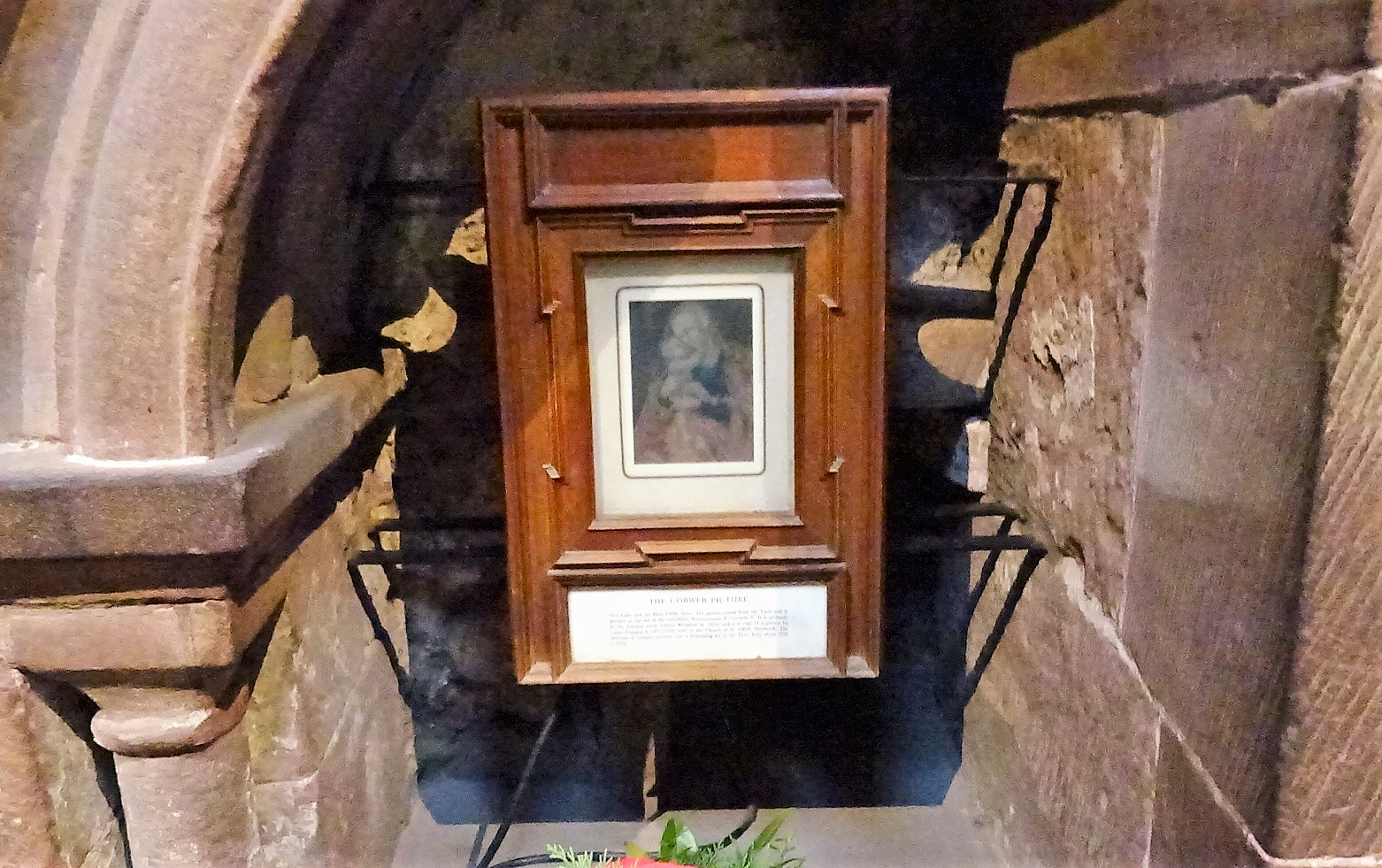
Madonna painting on caterpillar silk, Chester Cathedral

Cobweb painting, sometimes known as gossamer painting, is the delicate process of painting on canvases made from caterpillar and spider webs that have been collected, layered, cleaned, and framed. The fragile works of art on thin, translucent surfaces was practiced primarily in South Tyrol in the 18th and early 19th centuries. Fewer than 100 cobweb paintings are known to exist, many of which are housed in collections.

== Introduction ==
Cobwebs are formed by spiders from protein and extruded from spinnerets to form fine nets. The stickiness of spiders' webs that allows them to adhere to form a 'canvas' is due to droplets of glue suspended on the gossamer threads. Contrary to the name, the surface of most cobweb pictures is not an ordinary cobweb, but the felt-like web of caterpillars of the bird-cherry ermine (Yponomeuta evonymella). Therefore, the term "caterpillar web picture" would be the correct term, but "cobweb picture" was initially used for this art form and has been established as a synonym for more than 200 years. The caterpillars mainly attack bird cherry trees (Prunus padus) and cover the tree with a dense, tough web of silk secretion, under whose protection they devour the tree. Webs of funnel-web spiders (Agelenidae) were less frequently used as painting ground, although these were significantly more fragile and are more difficult to process. Also webs of the caterpillars of silkmoths and mediterranean flour moth were used less common. There is no evidence as to why artists painted on this webs.

== History ==
Web painting (Spinnwebenbilder) is first documented in the 16th century from the Puster Valley in the Austrian Tyrolean Alps, carried out by monks who produced paintings on canvases made entirely of spiders' webs or caterpillar silk. These religious miniatures were usually painted for convents, other religious institutions, the middle classes, and the minor aristocracy. Only around 100 are known to exist, primarily held in private collections.

Elias Prunner from the Puster Valley was the first secular artist to practice cobweb painting, and in 1765 he painted the Empress Maria Theresa.

Small paintings of celebrated beauty Philippine Welser in oval shaped frames were sold to tourists by Franz Unterberger (1838–1902) of Innsbruck, an artist who employed other local artists to produce the portraits. These cobweb paintings were exported to England, North America and Germany in significant numbers.

In the 19th and early 20th century the cobweb artists of Innsbruck painted landscapes and scenes involving local peasants, as well as military engagements of the wars of independence. The industrial revolution gave many new themes for cobweb artists to paint. From 1920 onwards no new cobweb paintings from the Tyrol have been recorded.

Anne Bradshaw Clopton (1878-1956) also created cobweb paintings.

== The cobweb canvas ==
Only a few instructions or recipes for processing the webs have survived, and they provide only imprecise information. The web can be cut with a knife or scissors and removed from the tree. Depending on the infestation and the size of the tree, it can reach up to 100 centimetres (3.3 ft) in length and up to 20 centimetres (0.66 ft) in width. Considerable attention must be taken to clean the web, removing insect parts, spider droppings, etc. For further cleaning and stabilization, it is placed in highly diluted milk so that the fibres swell and stick together to form a denser fleece. The treatment with milk was only reported by the painter August Trager, and the effect could be reproduced and confirmed in experiments in the 2010s. In this way, several webs can be placed on top of each other to achieve greater stability of the painting surface. The dried fleece is lightly stretched between two cardboard or wooden frames, with the area to be painted left out. The fabric is only clamped loosely, as it lightly shrinks during drying and painting. In terms of structure, the finished painting surface resembles very fine wrapping tissue.

It is noted that people were employed specifically to collect the large amount of cobwebs required for the many canvases.

Chester Cathedral possesses a cobweb image of the Virgin Mary, painted on the net of the moth caterpillar Yponomeuta evonymella, probably made by Johan Burgman (d. 1825) from the Tyrol, Austria. It is a copy of a painting by Lucas Cranach I (1472–1553) in Innsbruck Cathedral (Dom zu St. Jakob), Tyrol.

== The painting process ==
The painting is usually done with watercolors or ink. The painting starts from light to dark details, with highlights initially excluded, followed by several intermediate glaze layers with contour paintings to achieve the transparency of the motif. The painting surface is hydrophobic, so a relatively dry paint is used. Applied paint usually soaks through the entire canvas layers. Opaque applications of colors are rare. Cobweb canvas was used less frequently for printing engravings, etchings, or oil painting. Stippling is a technique that can be used to reduce the chance of damage to the canvas, however this can be very time-consuming. Chinese ink was also sometimes used.

== Conservation ==
Due to their fragile nature, cobweb paintings are very rare, and their preservation is challenging. In preserved originals, the painting appears largely stable, while the cobweb canvas itself is problematic. The cobweb fibres reacts sensitively to fluctuations in humidity, it dries out, becomes brittle, shrinks, and eventually cracks at relative humidity levels below 40% relative humidity. At this stage, repairs are hardly possible. Aging processes and high humidity promote the decomposition of fibre proteins and a drop of the pH value into a harmful acidic range. Exposed to ultraviolet light, the fibres tends to yellow due to photooxidation. It is almost impossible to remove intruded dirt, and additionally chemical reactions between the canvas fibres and the painting media occur. Due to the rarity of preserved originals, their fragile structure, and properties, makes it difficult to perform scientific analysis to identify the materials of the painting media used. To preserve the works of art, restorer Manuela Wiesend recommends dust-free and light-protected storage on a supportive surface at a constant relative humidity of 55%.

== See also ==
- Drawing
- Landscape painting
- Outline of painting
- Painting
- Visual arts
