= Yponomeuta liberalis =

Scientific classification
- Kingdom: Animalia
- Phylum: Arthropoda
- Class: Insecta
- Order: Lepidoptera
- Family: Yponomeutidae
- Genus: Yponomeuta
- Species: Y. liberalis

Binomial name
- Yponomeuta liberalis (Meyrick, 1913)

Synonyms
- Hyponomeuta liberalis Meyrick, 1913

Species of moth

Yponomeuta liberalis is a moth of the family Yponomeutidae. It is found in Australia.
