= Yponomeuta albonigratus =

Scientific classification
- Domain: Eukaryota
- Kingdom: Animalia
- Phylum: Arthropoda
- Class: Insecta
- Order: Lepidoptera
- Family: Yponomeutidae
- Genus: Yponomeuta
- Species: Y. albonigratus

Binomial name
- Yponomeuta albonigratus Gershenson, 1972

Species of moth

Yponomeuta albonigratus is a moth of the family Yponomeutidae. It is found in Tajikistan, Uzbekistan, Kyrgyzstan and is also recorded from the Levant.

Larvae have been recorded on Salicaceae species (Salix oxycarpa)
