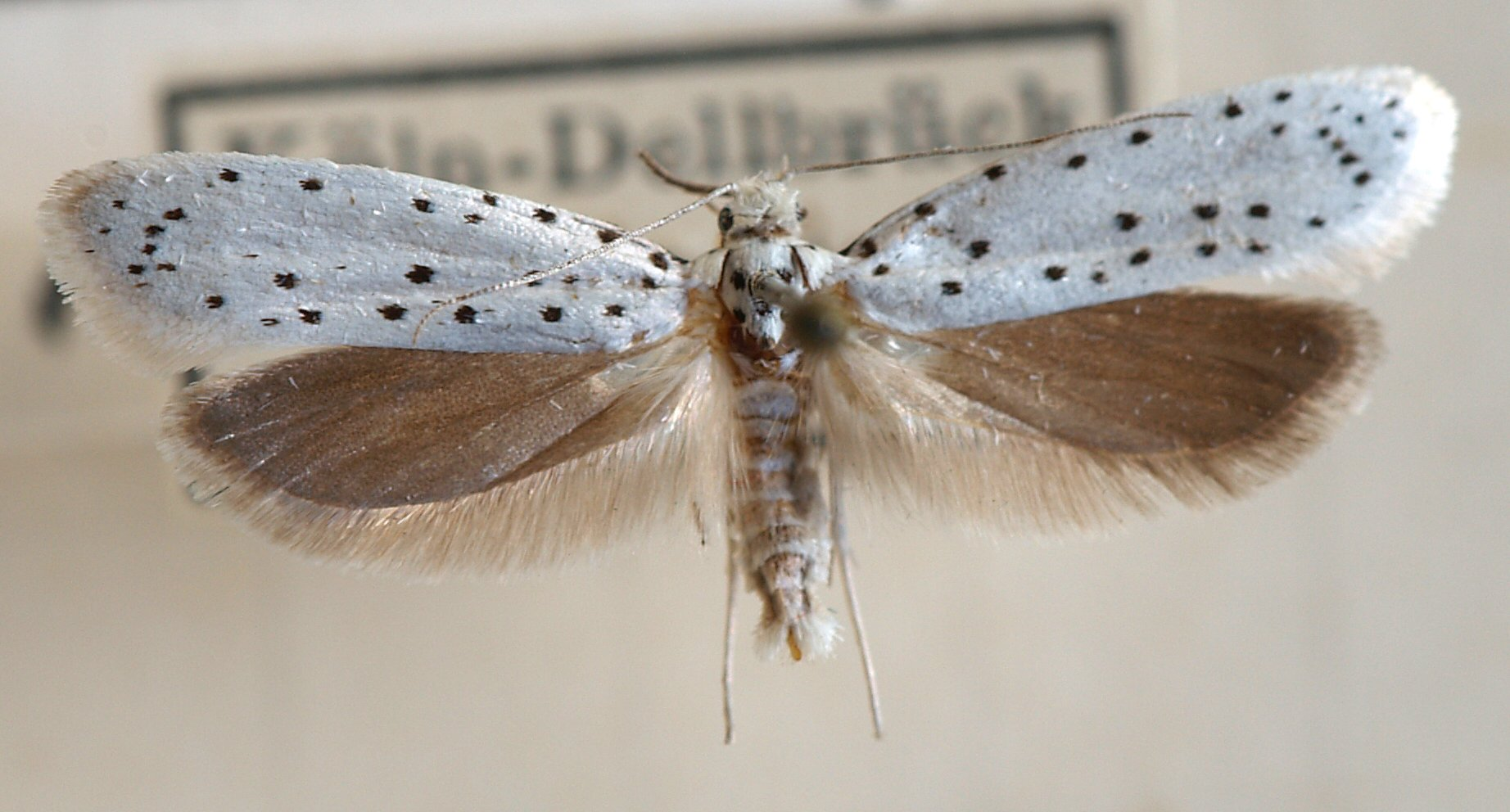

Scientific classification
- Kingdom: Animalia
- Phylum: Arthropoda
- Clade: Pancrustacea
- Class: Insecta
- Order: Lepidoptera
- Family: Yponomeutidae
- Genus: Yponomeuta
- Species: Y. rorrella

Binomial name
- Yponomeuta rorrella (Hübner, 1796)

Synonyms
- Tinea rorrella Hubner, 1796

= Yponomeuta rorrella =

Willow ermine moth

Species of moth

Yponomeuta rorrella (willow ermine moth) is a lepidopteran from the family Yponomeutidae, the ermine moths, probably a migrant, but abundantly found in Britain, mostly concentrated in Northumberland.
