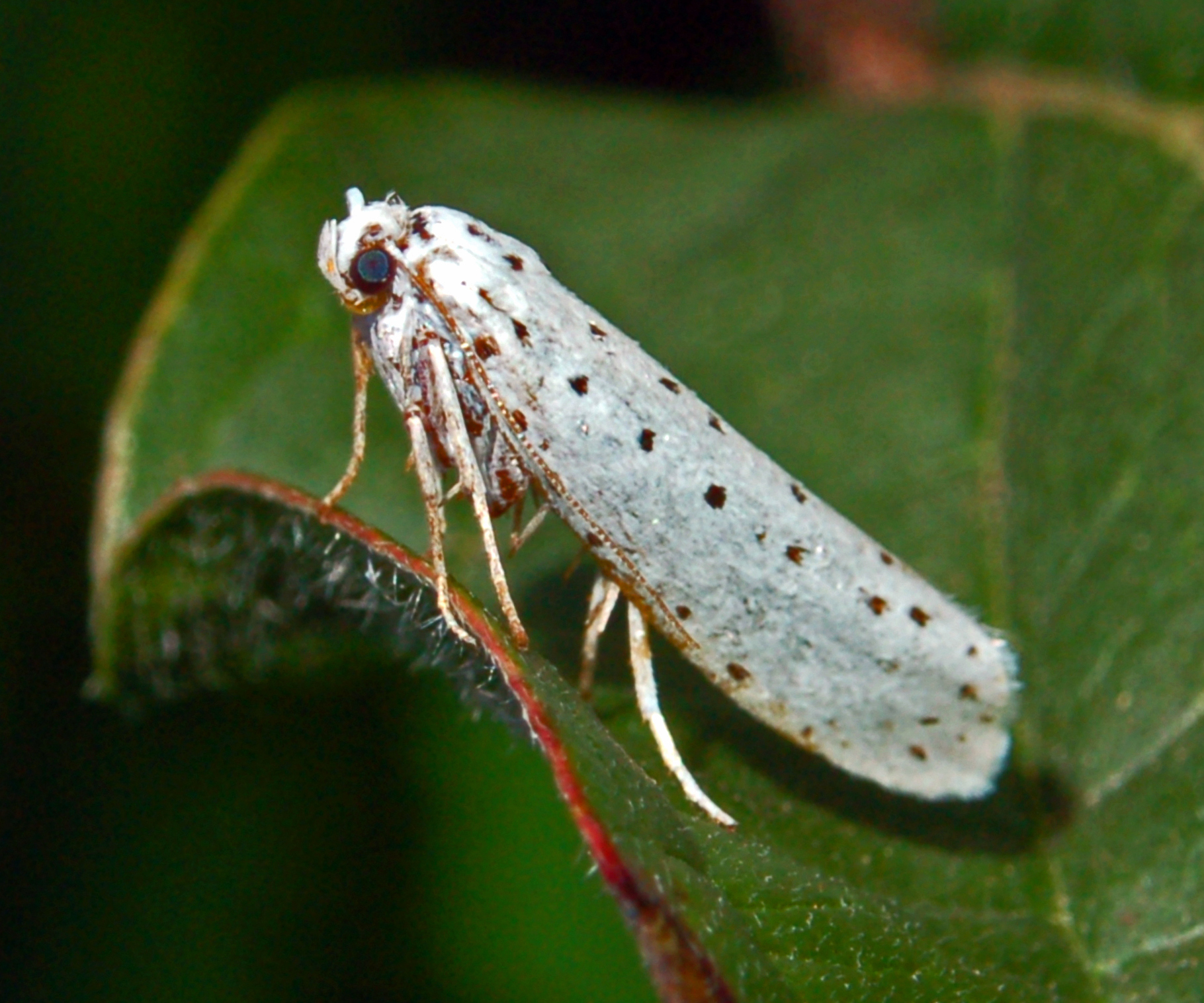
- Yponomeuta species

Scientific classification
- Kingdom: Animalia
- Phylum: Arthropoda
- Clade: Pancrustacea
- Class: Insecta
- Order: Lepidoptera
- Family: Yponomeutidae
- Subfamily: Yponomeutinae
- Genus: Yponomeuta; Latreille, [1796]

Species
- 100+, see text

Synonyms
- Hyponomeuta Billberg, 1820; Erminea Haworth, 1811; Coenyphantes Hübner, 1822; Nygmia Hübner, [1825] (nec Hübner, [1820]); Hyponomenta Turner, 1898

= Yponomeuta =

Genus of moths

Yponomeuta is a large genus of moths of the family Yponomeutidae. It has 103 described member species.

== Predator Defence ==
Several species have the ability to avoid predation by emitting a series of distinctive clicks as they fly. These clicks, broadcast at an amplitude that avoids attracting unnecessary attention, identify the moths as containing noxious substances and therefore discourage bats from eating them.

== Species ==
- Yponomeuta africana - Stainton, 1862
- Yponomeuta alba - Dufrane, 1960
- Yponomeuta albonigratus - Gershenzon, 1972
- Yponomeuta alienella - Walker, 1863
- Yponomeuta anatolica - Stringer, 1930
- Yponomeuta anomalella - Dufrane, 1960
- Yponomeuta athyris - Meyrick, 1928
- Yponomeuta cagnagella - (Hübner 1813)
- Yponomeuta calcarata - Meyrick, 1924
- Yponomeuta calculosa - Meyrick,
- Yponomeuta catharotis - Meyrick, 1935
- Yponomeuta chalcocoma - Meyrick, 1938
- Yponomeuta cinefacta - Meyrick, 1935
- Yponomeuta conisca - Meyrick, 1914
- Yponomeuta corpuscularis - Meyrick, 1907
- Yponomeuta delicata - Schultze, 1908
- Yponomeuta diaphorus - Walsingham, 1907
- Yponomeuta disemanta - Meyrick, 1933
- Yponomeuta effeta - Meyrick, 1924
- Yponomeuta elementaris - Meyrick, 1931
- Yponomeuta enneacentra - Meyrick, 1925
- Yponomeuta euonymella - Chambers, 1872
- Yponomeuta eurinellus - Zagulyayev, 1970
- Yponomeuta eusoma - Meyrick, 1914
- Yponomeuta evonymella - Linnaeus, 1758
- Yponomeuta evonymi - Zeller, 1844
- Yponomeuta favillacea - Meyrick, 1922
- Yponomeuta fumigata - Zeller, 1852
- Yponomeuta funesta - Meyrick, 1914
- Yponomeuta gigas - Rebel, 1892
- Yponomeuta glaphyropis - Meyrick, 1908
- Yponomeuta grisea - Dufrane, 1960
- Yponomeuta griseomaculatus - Gershenzon, 1970
- Yponomeuta helicella - Freyer, 1842
- Yponomeuta hemileuca - Meyrick, 1932
- Yponomeuta hexabola - Meyrick, 1935
- Yponomeuta horologa - Meyrick, 1935
- Yponomeuta hypsicrates - Meyrick, 1925
- Yponomeuta innotata - Walsingham, 1907
- Yponomeuta internella - Walker, 1863
- Yponomeuta interruptella - Sauber, 1902
- Yponomeuta irrorella - Hübner, 1796
- Yponomeuta kanaiella - Matsumura, 1931
- Yponomeuta leucothorax - Meyrick, 1913
- Yponomeuta leucotoma - Meyrick, 1935
- Yponomeuta liberalis - Meyrick, 1913
- Yponomeuta madagascariensis - Gershenson, 2001
- Yponomeuta mahalebella - Guenée, 1845
- Yponomeuta malinella (apple ermine moth) - Zeller, 1838
- Yponomeuta malivorella - Guenée, 1845
- Yponomeuta malinellus - (Zeller, 1838)
- Yponomeuta martinella - Walker, 1863
- Yponomeuta mayumivorella - Matsumura, 1931
- Yponomeuta meguronis - Matsumura, 1931
- Yponomeuta melanaster - Meyrick, 1907
- Yponomeuta meracula - Bradley, 1962
- Yponomeuta meridionalis - Gershenzon, 1972
- Yponomeuta millepunctatella - Warren, 1888
- Yponomeuta minuella - Walker, 1863
- Yponomeuta mochlocrossa - Meyrick, 1935
- Yponomeuta morbillosa - Zeller, 1877
- Yponomeuta multipunctella - Clemens, 1860
- Yponomeuta munda - Meyrick, 1921
- Yponomeuta myriosema - Turner, 1898
- Yponomeuta nigricola - Meyrick, 1912
- Yponomeuta nigrifimbrata - Christoph, 1882
- Yponomeuta numerosa - Meyrick, 1921
- Yponomeuta octocentra - Meyrick, 1921
- Yponomeuta ocypora - Meyrick, 1932
- Yponomeuta orbimaculella - Chambers, 1872
- Yponomeuta orientalis - Zagulyayev, 1970
- Yponomeuta padella - (Linnaeus, 1758)
- Yponomeuta paradoxus - Gershenzon, 1979
- Yponomeuta paurodes - Meyrick, 1907
- Yponomeuta perficitellus - Walker, 1863
- Yponomeuta plumbella - Schiffermüller, 1776
- Yponomeuta polysticta - Butler, 1879
- Yponomeuta polystigmellus - Felder, 1862
- Yponomeuta praetincta - Meyrick,
- Yponomeuta puncticornis - Walsingham, 1891
- Yponomeuta pustulella - Walker, 1863
- Yponomeuta refrigerata - Meyrick, 1931
- Yponomeuta rorella - Hübner, 1796
- Yponomeuta roscidella - Hübner, 1793
- Yponomeuta sedella - Treitschke, 1833
- Yponomeuta semialba - Meyrick, 1913
- Yponomeuta shansiella - Caradja,
- Yponomeuta sistrophora - Meyrick, 1909
- Yponomeuta sociatus - Moriuti, 1972
- Yponomeuta solitariellus - Moriuti, 1977
- Yponomeuta spodocrossa - Meyrick, 1935
- Yponomeuta stenodoxa - Meyrick, 1931
- Yponomeuta strigillata - Zeller, 1852
- Yponomeuta subplumbella - Walsingham, 1881
- Yponomeuta tokyonella - Matsumura, 1931
- Yponomeuta triangularis - Möschler, 1890
- Yponomeuta tyrodes - Meyrick, 1913
- Yponomeuta variabilis - Zeller, 1844
- Yponomeuta yanagawana - Matsumura, 1931
- Yponomeuta zagulajevi - Gershenzon, 1977
- Yponomeuta zebra - J.C. Sohn & C.S. Wu, 2010

== Former species ==
- Yponomeuta atomosella Dyar, 1902 is now known as Prays atomosella (Dyar, 1902)
