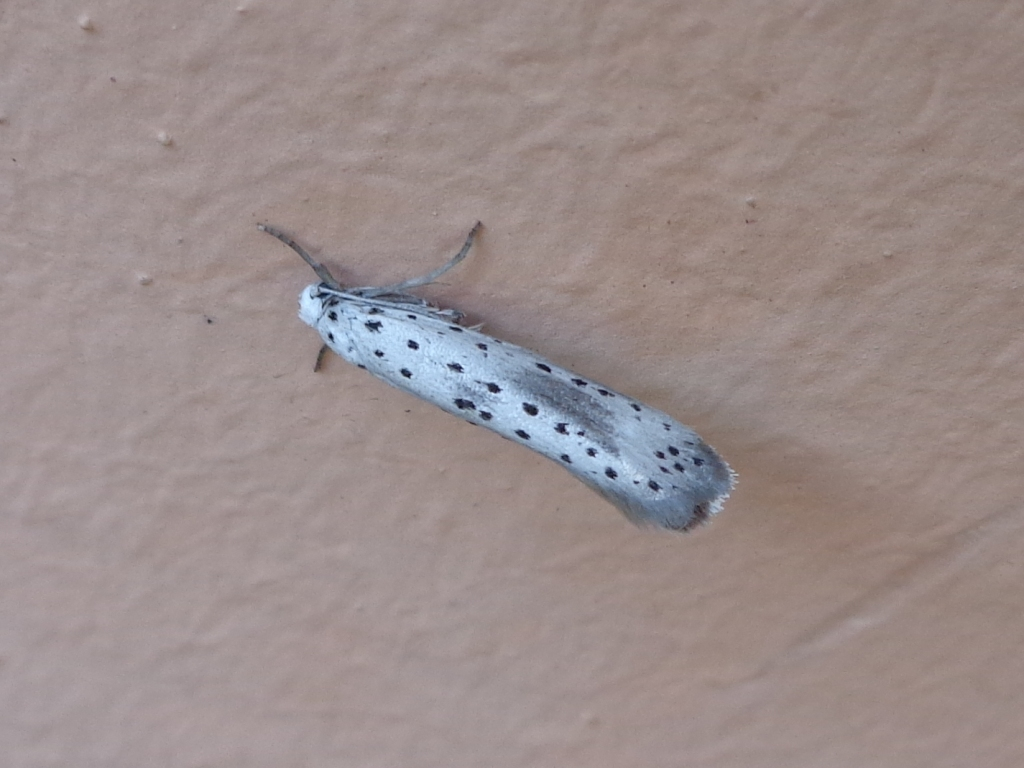

Scientific classification
- Kingdom: Animalia
- Phylum: Arthropoda
- Clade: Pancrustacea
- Class: Insecta
- Order: Lepidoptera
- Family: Yponomeutidae
- Genus: Yponomeuta
- Species: Y. irrorella

Binomial name
- Yponomeuta irrorella (Hübner, 1796)

Synonyms
- Tinea irrorella Hübner, 1796; Yponomeuta irrorellus

= Yponomeuta irrorella =

Species of moth

Yponomeuta irrorella is a moth of the family Yponomeutidae. It is found in most of Europe, except Ireland, Norway, Belgium, the Iberian Peninsula and the western and southern part of the Balkan Peninsula.

The wingspan is 19–25 mm. Adults are on wing from July to August.

The larvae feed on Euonymus europaeus from within a silken web.
