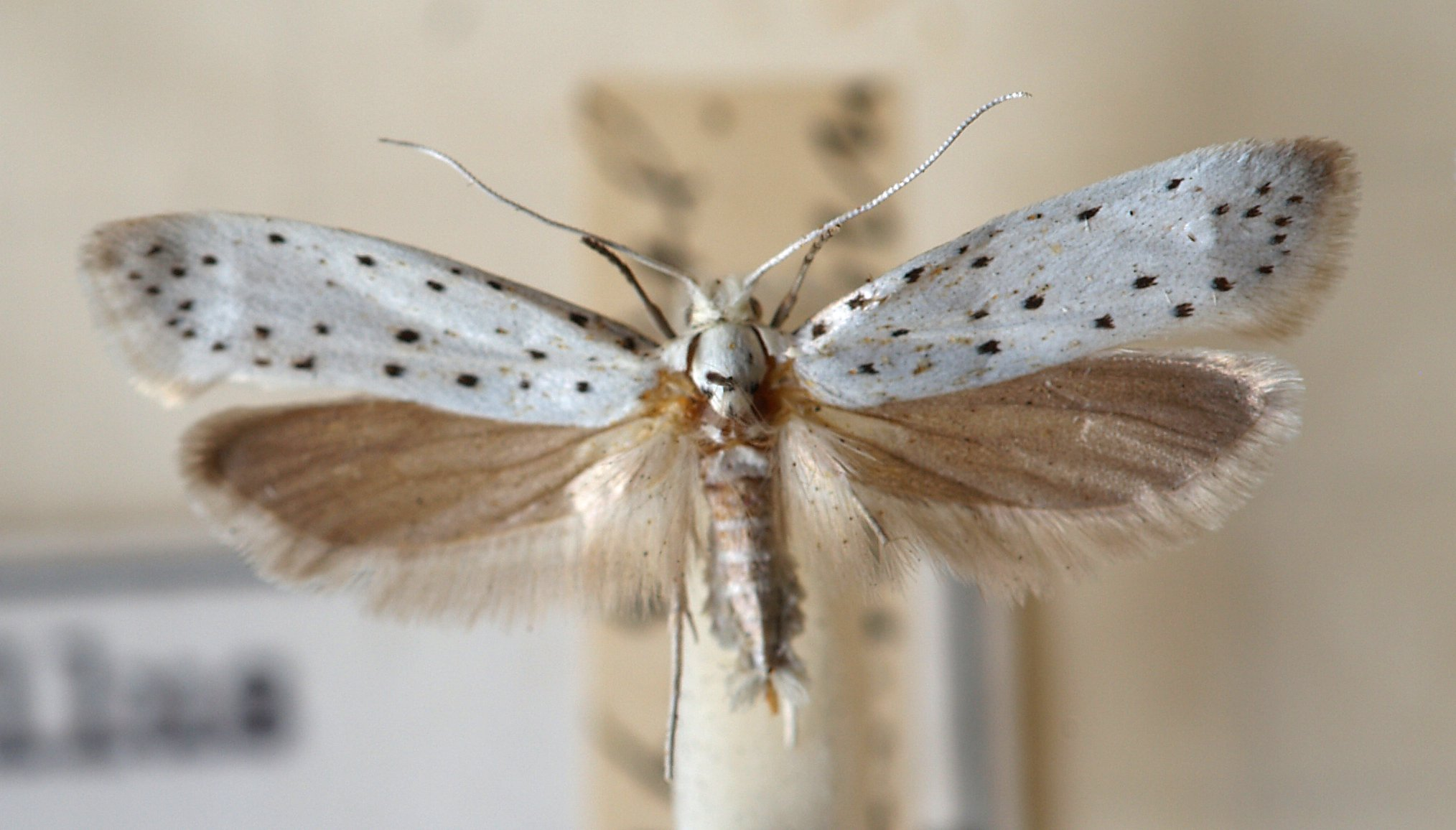

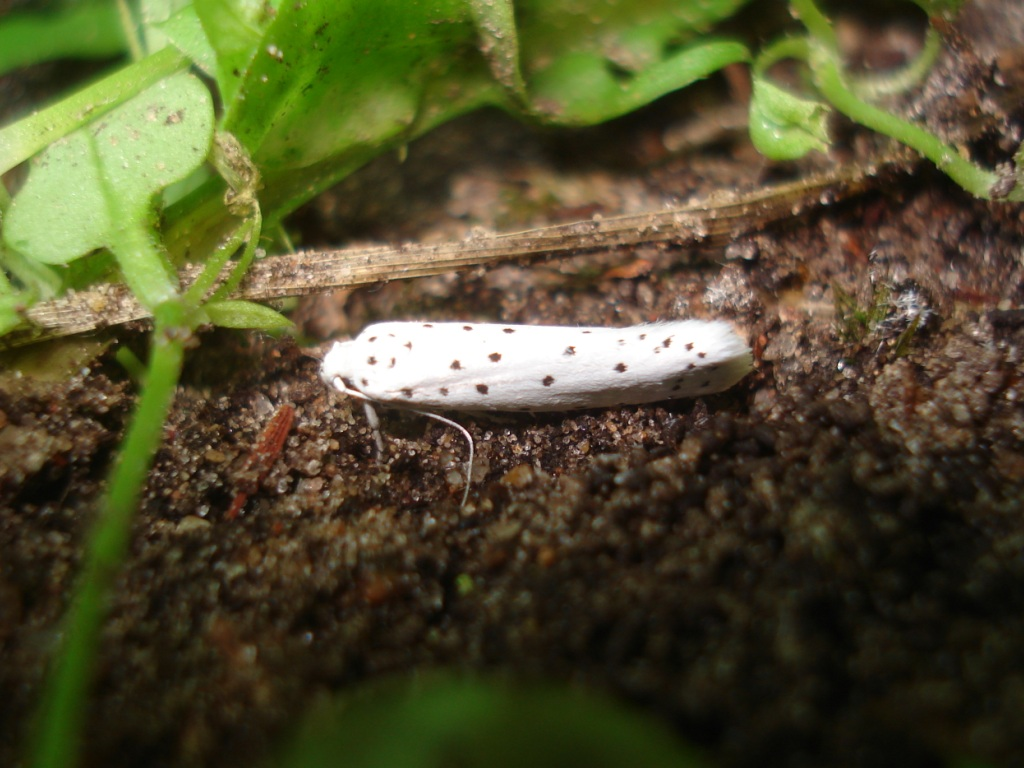

Scientific classification
- Kingdom: Animalia
- Phylum: Arthropoda
- Clade: Pancrustacea
- Class: Insecta
- Order: Lepidoptera
- Family: Yponomeutidae
- Genus: Yponomeuta
- Species: Y. malinellus

Binomial name
- Yponomeuta malinellus (Zeller, 1838)

Synonyms
- Hyponomeuta malinellus Zeller 1838; Yponomeuta malinella

= Yponomeuta malinellus =

Species of moth

Yponomeuta malinellus, the apple ermine, is a moth of the family Yponomeutidae. It is native to Europe and Asia, and it has spread to North America.

The wingspan is 16–20 millimetres (5/8–3/4 in). The forewings are white and have 12 to 16 black dots, which are arranged in three irregular lines. The moth flies from June to October.

The larvae feed on apple species. They can defoliate apple trees, and negatively impact fruit production for several years following an outbreak.

Y. malinellus larvae initially burrow into Malus leaves, and spin a silken tent in May and early June, within which they feed. The larvae, when fully grown, vary in length from 18 to 25 mm. The moth is found across England, whereas there are few reports of it in Scotland, Wales or Ireland. In Britain, the adult moth flies in July and August.

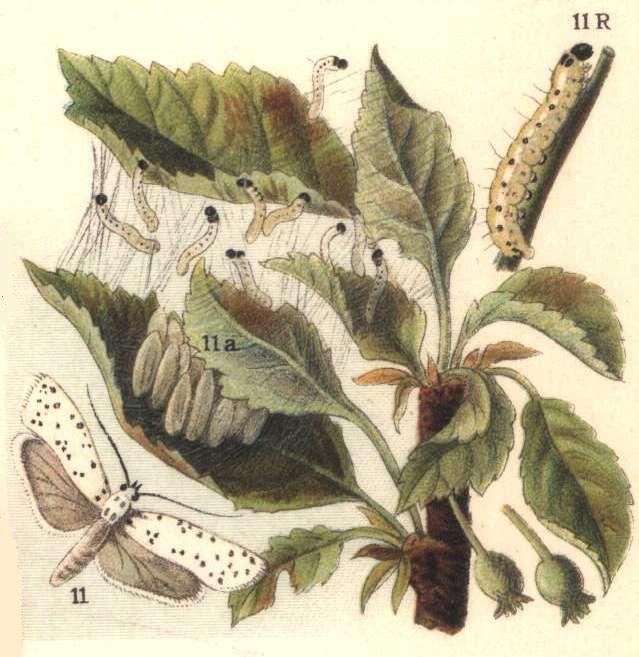
Drawing of the life-cycle

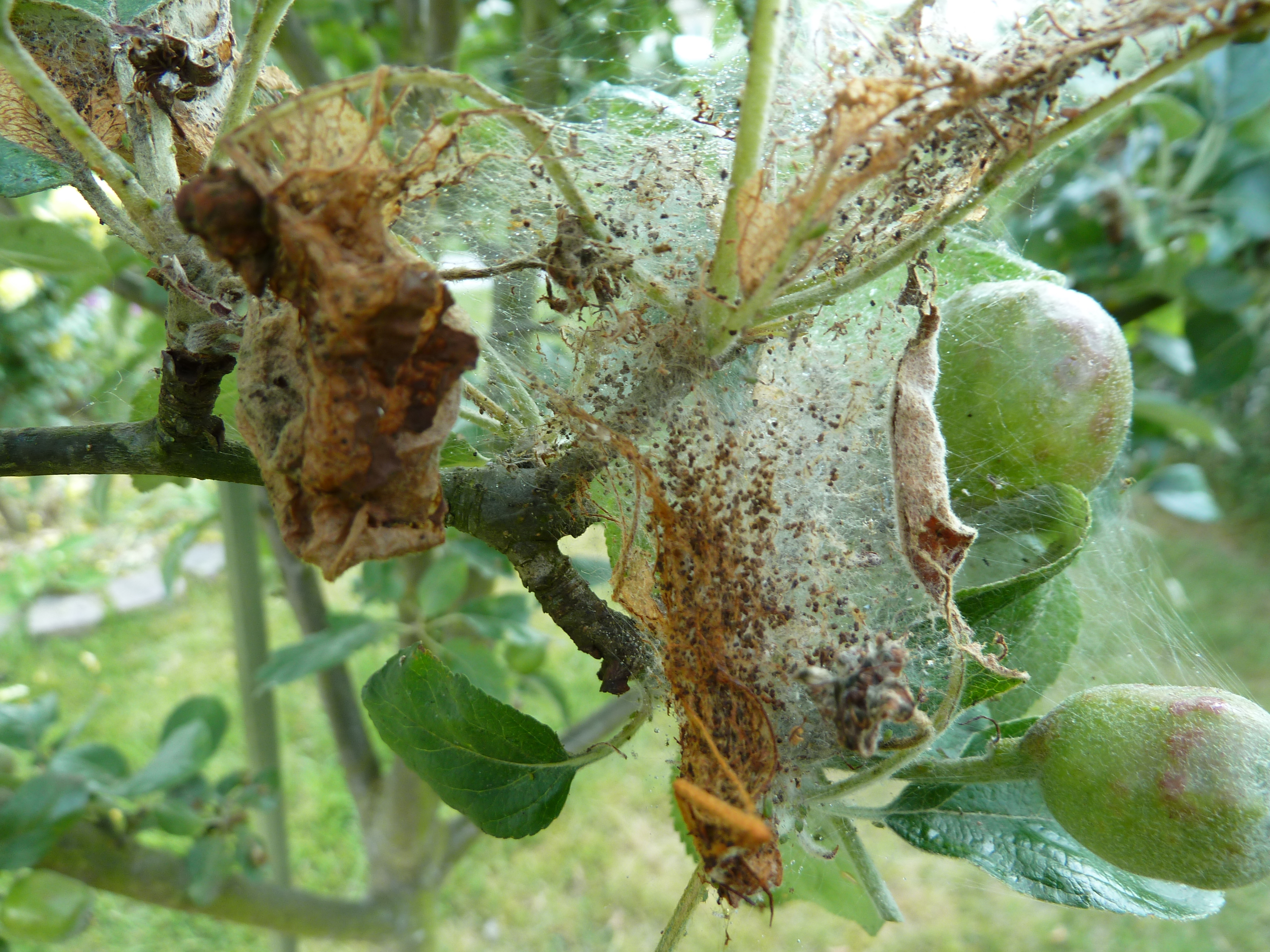
Tent made by the larvae. They eat the leaves inside the tent.
