= List of Lepidoptera of Ukraine =

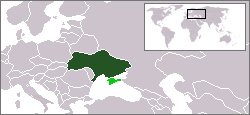
Location of Ukraine

The Lepidoptera of Ukraine consist of both the butterflies and moths recorded in Ukraine.

== Butterflies ==
=== Hesperiidae ===
- Carcharodus alceae (Esper, 1780)
- Carcharodus floccifera (Zeller, 1847)
- Carcharodus lavatherae (Esper, 1783)
- Carcharodus orientalis Reverdin, 1913
- Carterocephalus palaemon (Pallas, 1771)
- Carterocephalus silvicola (Meigen, 1829)
- Erynnis tages (Linnaeus, 1758)
- Hesperia comma (Linnaeus, 1758)
- Heteropterus morpheus (Pallas, 1771)
- Muschampia proto (Ochsenheimer, 1808)
- Muschampia tessellum (Hübner, 1803)
- Ochlodes sylvanus (Esper, 1777)
- Pyrgus alveus (Hübner, 1803)
- Pyrgus andromedae (Wallengren, 1853)
- Pyrgus armoricanus (Oberthur, 1910)
- Pyrgus carthami (Hübner, 1813)
- Pyrgus cinarae (Rambur, 1839)
- Pyrgus malvae (Linnaeus, 1758)
- Pyrgus serratulae (Rambur, 1839)
- Pyrgus sidae (Esper, 1784)
- Spialia orbifer (Hübner, 1823)
- Syrichtus cribrellum (Eversmann, 1841)
- Syrichtus proteides Wagner, 1929
- Thymelicus acteon (Rottemburg, 1775)
- Thymelicus lineola (Ochsenheimer, 1808)
- Thymelicus sylvestris (Poda, 1761)

=== Lycaenidae ===
- Agriades dardanus (Freyer, 1845)
- Agriades optilete (Knoch, 1781)
- Aricia agestis (Denis & Schiffermüller, 1775)
- Aricia anteros (Freyer, 1838)
- Aricia artaxerxes (Fabricius, 1793)
- Callophrys rubi (Linnaeus, 1758)
- Celastrina argiolus (Linnaeus, 1758)
- Cupido minimus (Fuessly, 1775)
- Cupido osiris (Meigen, 1829)
- Cupido alcetas (Hoffmannsegg, 1804)
- Cupido argiades (Pallas, 1771)
- Cupido decolorata (Staudinger, 1886)
- Cyaniris semiargus (Rottemburg, 1775)
- Eumedonia eumedon (Esper, 1780)
- Favonius quercus (Linnaeus, 1758)
- Glaucopsyche alexis (Poda, 1761)
- Iolana iolas (Ochsenheimer, 1816)
- Kretania pylaon (Fischer von Waldheim, 1832)
- Lampides boeticus (Linnaeus, 1767)
- Leptotes pirithous (Linnaeus, 1767)
- Lycaena alciphron (Rottemburg, 1775)
- Lycaena dispar (Haworth, 1802)
- Lycaena helle (Denis & Schiffermüller, 1775)
- Lycaena hippothoe (Linnaeus, 1761)
- Lycaena phlaeas (Linnaeus, 1761)
- Lycaena thersamon (Esper, 1784)
- Lycaena tityrus (Poda, 1761)
- Lycaena virgaureae (Linnaeus, 1758)
- Lysandra bellargus (Rottemburg, 1775)
- Lysandra coridon (Poda, 1761)
- Lysandra corydonius (Herrich-Schäffer, 1852)
- Neolycaena rhymnus (Eversmann, 1832)
- Phengaris alcon (Denis & Schiffermüller, 1775)
- Phengaris arion (Linnaeus, 1758)
- Phengaris nausithous (Bergstrasser, 1779)
- Phengaris teleius (Bergstrasser, 1779)
- Plebejus argus (Linnaeus, 1758)
- Plebejus argyrognomon (Bergstrasser, 1779)
- Plebejus idas (Linnaeus, 1761)
- Polyommatus damocles (Herrich-Schäffer, 1844)
- Polyommatus damon (Denis & Schiffermüller, 1775)
- Polyommatus damone (Eversmann, 1841)
- Polyommatus ripartii (Freyer, 1830)
- Polyommatus daphnis (Denis & Schiffermüller, 1775)
- Polyommatus amandus (Schneider, 1792)
- Polyommatus dorylas (Denis & Schiffermüller, 1775)
- Polyommatus eros (Ochsenheimer, 1808)
- Polyommatus icarus (Rottemburg, 1775)
- Polyommatus thersites (Cantener, 1835)
- Pseudophilotes bavius (Eversmann, 1832)
- Pseudophilotes vicrama (Moore, 1865)
- Satyrium acaciae (Fabricius, 1787)
- Satyrium ilicis (Esper, 1779)
- Satyrium pruni (Linnaeus, 1758)
- Satyrium spini (Denis & Schiffermüller, 1775)
- Satyrium w-album (Knoch, 1782)
- Scolitantides orion (Pallas, 1771)
- Thecla betulae (Linnaeus, 1758)
- Tomares callimachus (Eversmann, 1848)
- Tomares nogelii (Herrich-Schäffer, 1851)

=== Nymphalidae ===
- Aglais io (Linnaeus, 1758)
- Aglais urticae (Linnaeus, 1758)
- Apatura ilia (Denis & Schiffermüller, 1775)
- Apatura iris (Linnaeus, 1758)
- Apatura metis Freyer, 1829
- Aphantopus hyperantus (Linnaeus, 1758)
- Araschnia levana (Linnaeus, 1758)
- Arethusana arethusa (Denis & Schiffermüller, 1775)
- Argynnis paphia (Linnaeus, 1758)
- Argynnis laodice (Pallas, 1771)
- Argynnis pandora (Denis & Schiffermüller, 1775)
- Boloria aquilonaris (Stichel, 1908)
- Boloria dia (Linnaeus, 1767)
- Boloria euphrosyne (Linnaeus, 1758)
- Boloria selene (Denis & Schiffermüller, 1775)
- Boloria titania (Esper, 1793)
- Boloria eunomia (Esper, 1799)
- Brenthis daphne (Bergstrasser, 1780)
- Brenthis hecate (Denis & Schiffermüller, 1775)
- Brenthis ino (Rottemburg, 1775)
- Brintesia circe (Fabricius, 1775)
- Chazara briseis (Linnaeus, 1764)
- Chazara persephone (Hübner, 1805)
- Coenonympha arcania (Linnaeus, 1761)
- Coenonympha glycerion (Borkhausen, 1788)
- Coenonympha hero (Linnaeus, 1761)
- Coenonympha leander (Esper, 1784)
- Coenonympha oedippus (Fabricius, 1787)
- Coenonympha pamphilus (Linnaeus, 1758)
- Coenonympha phryne (Pallas, 1771)
- Coenonympha tullia (Muller, 1764)
- Danaus chrysippus (Linnaeus, 1758)
- Erebia aethiops (Esper, 1777)
- Erebia euryale (Esper, 1805)
- Erebia ligea (Linnaeus, 1758)
- Erebia manto (Denis & Schiffermüller, 1775)
- Erebia medusa (Denis & Schiffermüller, 1775)
- Erebia pronoe (Esper, 1780)
- Euphydryas aurinia (Rottemburg, 1775)
- Euphydryas maturna (Linnaeus, 1758)
- Fabriciana adippe (Denis & Schiffermüller, 1775)
- Fabriciana niobe (Linnaeus, 1758)
- Hipparchia fagi (Scopoli, 1763)
- Hipparchia hermione (Linnaeus, 1764)
- Hipparchia statilinus (Hufnagel, 1766)
- Hipparchia pellucida (Stauder, 1923)
- Hipparchia semele (Linnaeus, 1758)
- Hyponephele lupinus (O. Costa, 1836)
- Hyponephele lycaon (Rottemburg, 1775)
- Issoria lathonia (Linnaeus, 1758)
- Kirinia climene (Esper, 1783)
- Lasiommata maera (Linnaeus, 1758)
- Lasiommata megera (Linnaeus, 1767)
- Libythea celtis (Laicharting, 1782)
- Limenitis camilla (Linnaeus, 1764)
- Limenitis populi (Linnaeus, 1758)
- Lopinga achine (Scopoli, 1763)
- Maniola jurtina (Linnaeus, 1758)
- Melanargia galathea (Linnaeus, 1758)
- Melanargia russiae (Esper, 1783)
- Melitaea arduinna (Esper, 1783)
- Melitaea athalia (Rottemburg, 1775)
- Melitaea aurelia Nickerl, 1850
- Melitaea britomartis Assmann, 1847
- Melitaea cinxia (Linnaeus, 1758)
- Melitaea diamina (Lang, 1789)
- Melitaea didyma (Esper, 1778)
- Melitaea phoebe (Denis & Schiffermüller, 1775)
- Melitaea telona Fruhstorfer, 1908
- Melitaea trivia (Denis & Schiffermüller, 1775)
- Minois dryas (Scopoli, 1763)
- Neptis rivularis (Scopoli, 1763)
- Neptis sappho (Pallas, 1771)
- Nymphalis antiopa (Linnaeus, 1758)
- Nymphalis polychloros (Linnaeus, 1758)
- Nymphalis vaualbum (Denis & Schiffermüller, 1775)
- Nymphalis xanthomelas (Esper, 1781)
- Oeneis tarpeia (Pallas, 1771)
- Pararge aegeria (Linnaeus, 1758)
- Polygonia c-album (Linnaeus, 1758)
- Proterebia afra (Fabricius, 1787)
- Pseudochazara euxina (Kuznetzov, 1909)
- Pyronia tithonus (Linnaeus, 1767)
- Satyrus ferula (Fabricius, 1793)
- Satyrus virbius (Herrich-Schäffer, 1844)
- Speyeria aglaja (Linnaeus, 1758)
- Vanessa atalanta (Linnaeus, 1758)
- Vanessa cardui (Linnaeus, 1758)

=== Papilionidae ===
- Iphiclides podalirius (Linnaeus, 1758)
- Papilio machaon Linnaeus, 1758
- Parnassius apollo (Linnaeus, 1758)
- Parnassius mnemosyne (Linnaeus, 1758)
- Zerynthia polyxena (Denis & Schiffermüller, 1775)

=== Pieridae ===
- Anthocharis cardamines (Linnaeus, 1758)
- Aporia crataegi (Linnaeus, 1758)
- Colias alfacariensis Ribbe, 1905
- Colias chrysotheme (Esper, 1781)
- Colias croceus (Fourcroy, 1785)
- Colias erate (Esper, 1805)
- Colias hyale (Linnaeus, 1758)
- Colias myrmidone (Esper, 1781)
- Colias palaeno (Linnaeus, 1761)
- Euchloe ausonia (Hübner, 1804)
- Gonepteryx rhamni (Linnaeus, 1758)
- Leptidea duponcheli (Staudinger, 1871)
- Leptidea morsei (Fenton, 1882)
- Leptidea sinapis (Linnaeus, 1758)
- Pieris brassicae (Linnaeus, 1758)
- Pieris bryoniae (Hübner, 1806)
- Pieris napi (Linnaeus, 1758)
- Pieris rapae (Linnaeus, 1758)
- Pontia chloridice (Hübner, 1813)
- Pontia edusa (Fabricius, 1777)
- Zegris eupheme (Esper, 1804)

=== Riodinidae ===
- Hamearis lucina (Linnaeus, 1758)

== Moths ==
=== Acanthopteroctetidae ===
- Catapterix crimaea Zagulajev & Sinev, 1988

=== Adelidae ===
- Adela croesella (Scopoli, 1763)
- Adela cuprella (Denis & Schiffermüller, 1775)
- Adela reaumurella (Linnaeus, 1758)
- Adela violella (Denis & Schiffermüller, 1775)
- Cauchas fibulella (Denis & Schiffermüller, 1775)
- Cauchas leucocerella (Scopoli, 1763)
- Nematopogon metaxella (Hübner, 1813)
- Nematopogon pilella (Denis & Schiffermüller, 1775)
- Nematopogon robertella (Clerck, 1759)
- Nemophora degeerella (Linnaeus, 1758)
- Nemophora dumerilella (Duponchel, 1839)
- Nemophora fasciella (Fabricius, 1775)
- Nemophora metallica (Poda, 1761)
- Nemophora pfeifferella (Hübner, 1813)

=== Alucitidae ===
- Alucita budashkini Zagulajev, 2000
- Alucita bulgaria Zagulajev, 2000
- Alucita desmodactyla Zeller, 1847
- Alucita karadagica Zagulajev, 2000
- Alucita pliginskii Zagulajev, 2000

=== Argyresthiidae ===
- Argyresthia albistria (Haworth, 1828)
- Argyresthia bonnetella (Linnaeus, 1758)
- Argyresthia brockeella (Hübner, 1813)
- Argyresthia conjugella Zeller, 1839
- Argyresthia curvella (Linnaeus, 1761)
- Argyresthia fundella (Fischer von Röslerstamm, 1835)
- Argyresthia goedartella (Linnaeus, 1758)
- Argyresthia ivella (Haworth, 1828)
- Argyresthia pruniella (Clerck, 1759)
- Argyresthia pygmaeella (Denis & Schiffermüller, 1775)
- Argyresthia retinella Zeller, 1839
- Argyresthia semifusca (Haworth, 1828)
- Argyresthia sorbiella (Treitschke, 1833)
- Argyresthia spinosella Stainton, 1849
- Argyresthia bergiella (Ratzeburg, 1840)
- Argyresthia glabratella (Zeller, 1847)
- Argyresthia illuminatella Zeller, 1839
- Argyresthia laevigatella Herrich-Schäffer, 1855
- Argyresthia praecocella Zeller, 1839

=== Autostichidae ===
- Amselina cedestiella (Zeller, 1868)
- Holcopogon bubulcellus (Staudinger, 1859)

=== Batrachedridae ===
- Batrachedra pinicolella (Zeller, 1839)
- Batrachedra praeangusta (Haworth, 1828)

=== Bedelliidae ===
- Bedellia somnulentella (Zeller, 1847)

=== Blastobasidae ===
- Blastobasis phycidella (Zeller, 1839)
- Blastobasis ponticella Sinev, 2007
- Hypatopa binotella (Thunberg, 1794)
- Hypatopa inunctella Zeller, 1839
- Hypatopa segnella (Zeller, 1873)

=== Brachodidae ===
- Brachodes appendiculata (Esper, 1783)
- Brachodes pumila (Ochsenheimer, 1808)

=== Brahmaeidae ===
- Lemonia dumi (Linnaeus, 1761)
- Lemonia taraxaci (Denis & Schiffermüller, 1775)

=== Bucculatricidae ===
- Bucculatrix albedinella (Zeller, 1839)
- Bucculatrix anthemidella Deschka, 1972
- Bucculatrix argentisignella Herrich-Schäffer, 1855
- Bucculatrix artemisiella Herrich-Schäffer, 1855
- Bucculatrix bechsteinella (Bechstein & Scharfenberg, 1805)
- Bucculatrix cidarella (Zeller, 1839)
- Bucculatrix cristatella (Zeller, 1839)
- Bucculatrix demaryella (Duponchel, 1840)
- Bucculatrix frangutella (Goeze, 1783)
- Bucculatrix gnaphaliella (Treitschke, 1833)
- Bucculatrix infans Staudinger, 1880
- Bucculatrix maritima Stainton, 1851
- Bucculatrix nigricomella (Zeller, 1839)
- Bucculatrix noltei Petry, 1912
- Bucculatrix paliuricola Kuznetzov, 1960
- Bucculatrix ratisbonensis Stainton, 1861
- Bucculatrix thoracella (Thunberg, 1794)
- Bucculatrix ulmella Zeller, 1848
- Bucculatrix ulmicola Kuznetzov, 1962
- Bucculatrix ulmifoliae M. Hering, 1931

=== Chimabachidae ===
- Dasystoma salicella (Hübner, 1796)
- Diurnea fagella (Denis & Schiffermüller, 1775)
- Diurnea lipsiella (Denis & Schiffermüller, 1775)

=== Choreutidae ===
- Anthophila abhasica Danilevsky, 1969
- Anthophila fabriciana (Linnaeus, 1767)
- Choreutis nemorana (Hübner, 1799)
- Choreutis pariana (Clerck, 1759)
- Prochoreutis myllerana (Fabricius, 1794)
- Prochoreutis pseudostellaris Budashkin, 2003
- Prochoreutis sehestediana (Fabricius, 1776)
- Prochoreutis stellaris (Zeller, 1847)
- Tebenna bjerkandrella (Thunberg, 1784)
- Tebenna chingana Danilevsky, 1969

=== Coleophoridae ===
- Coleophora adjunctella Hodgkinson, 1882
- Coleophora adspersella Benander, 1939
- Coleophora aestuariella Bradley, 1984
- Coleophora albicans Zeller, 1849
- Coleophora alcyonipennella (Kollar, 1832)
- Coleophora alticolella Zeller, 1849
- Coleophora argentula (Stephens, 1834)
- Coleophora armeniae Baldizzone & Patzak, 1991
- Coleophora astragalella Zeller, 1849
- Coleophora atriplicis Meyrick, 1928
- Coleophora bagorella Falkovitsh, 1977
- Coleophora berdjanski Baldizzone & Patzak, 1991
- Coleophora binotapennella (Duponchel, 1843)
- Coleophora cartilaginella Christoph, 1872
- Coleophora cecidophorella Oudejans, 1972
- Coleophora changaica Reznik, 1975
- Coleophora clypeiferella Hofmann, 1871
- Coleophora cracella (Vallot, 1835)
- Coleophora glaucicolella Wood, 1892
- Coleophora granulatella Zeller, 1849
- Coleophora gulinovi Baldizzone & Patzak, 1991
- Coleophora halophilella Zimmermann, 1926
- Coleophora klimeschiella Toll, 1952
- Coleophora lixella Zeller, 1849
- Coleophora magyarica Baldizzone, 1983
- Coleophora motacillella Zeller, 1849
- Coleophora nomgona Falkovitsh, 1975
- Coleophora occatella Staudinger, 1880
- Coleophora ochroflava Toll, 1961
- Coleophora paradrymidis Toll, 1949
- Coleophora parenthella Toll, 1952
- Coleophora peribenanderi Toll, 1943
- Coleophora pontica (Reznik, 1984)
- Coleophora potentillae Elisha, 1885
- Coleophora preisseckeri Toll, 1942
- Coleophora pseudociconiella Toll, 1952
- Coleophora pseudodianthi Baldizzone & Tabell, 2006
- Coleophora pseudoditella Baldizzone & Patzak, 1983
- Coleophora pseudorepentis Toll, 1960
- Coleophora riffelensis Rebel, 1913
- Coleophora salicorniae Heinemann & Wocke, 1877
- Coleophora salinella Stainton, 1859
- Coleophora saxicolella (Duponchel, 1843)
- Coleophora serinipennella Christoph, 1872
- Coleophora squalorella Zeller, 1849
- Coleophora superlonga (Falkovitsh, 1989)
- Coleophora therinella Tengstrom, 1848
- Coleophora trientella Christoph, 1872
- Coleophora trifolii (Curtis, 1832)
- Coleophora ucrainae Baldizzone & Patzak, 1991
- Coleophora univittella Staudinger, 1880
- Coleophora versurella Zeller, 1849
- Coleophora vestianella (Linnaeus, 1758)
- Coleophora vibicella (Hübner, 1813)
- Coleophora vicinella Zeller, 1849

=== Cosmopterigidae ===
- Ascalenia vanella (Frey, 1860)
- Ascalenia viviparella Kasy, 1969
- Cosmopterix lienigiella Zeller, 1846
- Cosmopterix orichalcea Stainton, 1861
- Cosmopterix scribaiella Zeller, 1850
- Cosmopterix zieglerella (Hübner, 1810)
- Eteobalea anonymella (Riedl, 1965)
- Eteobalea intermediella (Riedl, 1966)
- Eteobalea serratella (Treitschke, 1833)
- Eteobalea sumptuosella (Lederer, 1855)
- Eteobalea tririvella (Staudinger, 1870)
- Limnaecia phragmitella Stainton, 1851
- Pancalia leuwenhoekella (Linnaeus, 1761)
- Pancalia nodosella (Bruand, 1851)
- Pancalia schwarzella (Fabricius, 1798)
- Pyroderces argyrogrammos (Zeller, 1847)
- Pyroderces caesaris Gozmany, 1957
- Sorhagenia janiszewskae Riedl, 1962
- Sorhagenia lophyrella (Douglas, 1846)
- Sorhagenia rhamniella (Zeller, 1839)
- Stagmatophora heydeniella (Fischer von Röslerstamm, 1838)
- Vulcaniella cognatella Riedl, 1990
- Vulcaniella extremella (Wocke, 1871)
- Vulcaniella grandiferella Sinev, 1986
- Vulcaniella karadaghella Sinev, 1986
- Vulcaniella pomposella (Zeller, 1839)

=== Cossidae ===
- Acossus terebra (Denis & Schiffermüller, 1775)
- Cossus cossus (Linnaeus, 1758)
- Dyspessa infuscata (Staudinger, 1892)
- Dyspessa kostjuki Yakovlev, 2005
- Dyspessa salicicola (Eversmann, 1848)
- Dyspessa ulula (Borkhausen, 1790)
- Dyspessa wagneri Schwingenschuss, 1939
- Paracossulus thrips (Hübner, 1818)
- Parahypopta caestrum (Hübner, 1808)
- Phragmataecia castaneae (Hübner, 1790)
- Stygoides tricolor (Lederer, 1858)
- Zeuzera pyrina (Linnaeus, 1761)

=== Crambidae ===
- Acentria ephemerella (Denis & Schiffermüller, 1775)
- Agriphila aeneociliella (Eversmann, 1844)
- Agriphila brioniellus (Zerny, 1914)
- Agriphila geniculea (Haworth, 1811)
- Agriphila poliellus (Treitschke, 1832)
- Agriphila tolli (Błeszyński, 1952)
- Agrotera nemoralis (Scopoli, 1763)
- Anania lancealis (Denis & Schiffermüller, 1775)
- Anania perlucidalis (Hübner, 1809)
- Anania stachydalis (Germar, 1821)
- Anania terrealis (Treitschke, 1829)
- Anania testacealis (Zeller, 1847)
- Ancylolomia palpella (Denis & Schiffermüller, 1775)
- Ancylolomia tentaculella (Hübner, 1796)
- Aporodes floralis (Hübner, 1809)
- Atralata albofascialis (Treitschke, 1829)
- Catoptria myella (Hübner, 1796)
- Catoptria pauperellus (Treitschke, 1832)
- Catoptria petrificella (Hübner, 1796)
- Chilo phragmitella (Hübner, 1805)
- Chilo pulverosellus Ragonot, 1895
- Chrysocrambus craterella (Scopoli, 1763)
- Crambus hamella (Thunberg, 1788)
- Cynaeda dentalis (Denis & Schiffermüller, 1775)
- Diasemiopsis ramburialis (Duponchel, 1834)
- Dolicharthria punctalis (Denis & Schiffermüller, 1775)
- Dolicharthria stigmosalis (Herrich-Schäffer, 1848)
- Donacaula mucronella (Denis & Schiffermüller, 1775)
- Ecpyrrhorrhoe rubiginalis (Hübner, 1796)
- Epascestria pustulalis (Hübner, 1823)
- Euchromius bella (Hübner, 1796)
- Euchromius cambridgei (Zeller, 1867)
- Euchromius ocellea (Haworth, 1811)
- Euchromius rayatellus (Amsel, 1949)
- Eudonia murana (Curtis, 1827)
- Eurrhypis cacuminalis (Eversmann, 1843)
- Eurrhypis pollinalis (Denis & Schiffermüller, 1775)
- Evergestis alborivulalis (Eversmann, 1844)
- Evergestis extimalis (Scopoli, 1763)
- Evergestis limbata (Linnaeus, 1767)
- Evergestis pallidata (Hufnagel, 1767)
- Evergestis politalis (Denis & Schiffermüller, 1775)
- Evergestis serratalis (Staudinger, 1871)
- Evergestis sophialis (Fabricius, 1787)
- Friedlanderia cicatricella (Hübner, 1824)
- Heliothela wulfeniana (Scopoli, 1763)
- Kasania arundinalis (Eversmann, 1842)
- Loxostege aeruginalis (Hübner, 1796)
- Loxostege clathralis (Hübner, 1813)
- Loxostege comptalis (Freyer, 1848)
- Loxostege mucosalis (Herrich-Schäffer, 1848)
- Loxostege turbidalis (Treitschke, 1829)
- Loxostege virescalis (Guenee, 1854)
- Mecyna trinalis (Denis & Schiffermüller, 1775)
- Metacrambus carectellus (Zeller, 1847)
- Metaxmeste phrygialis (Hübner, 1796)
- Ostrinia palustralis (Hübner, 1796)
- Ostrinia quadripunctalis (Denis & Schiffermüller, 1775)
- Ostrinia scapulalis (Walker, 1859)
- Paracorsia repandalis (Denis & Schiffermüller, 1775)
- Parapoynx nivalis (Denis & Schiffermüller, 1775)
- Paratalanta hyalinalis (Hübner, 1796)
- Pediasia jucundellus (Herrich-Schäffer, 1847)
- Pediasia luteella (Denis & Schiffermüller, 1775)
- Pediasia matricella (Treitschke, 1832)
- Pleuroptya ruralis (Scopoli, 1763)
- Pyrausta aerealis (Hübner, 1793)
- Pyrausta aurata (Scopoli, 1763)
- Pyrausta falcatalis Guenee, 1854
- Pyrausta obfuscata (Scopoli, 1763)
- Pyrausta ostrinalis (Hübner, 1796)
- Pyrausta pavidalis Zerny in Osthelder, 1935
- Schoenobius gigantella (Denis & Schiffermüller, 1775)
- Scirpophaga praelata (Scopoli, 1763)
- Sclerocona acutella (Eversmann, 1842)
- Scoparia pyralella (Denis & Schiffermüller, 1775)
- Syrianarpia mendicalis (Staudinger, 1879)
- Talis quercella (Denis & Schiffermüller, 1775)
- Tegostoma comparalis (Hübner, 1796)
- Thopeutis galleriellus (Ragonot, 1892)
- Udea accolalis (Zeller, 1867)
- Udea ferrugalis (Hübner, 1796)
- Udea fulvalis (Hübner, 1809)
- Udea hamalis (Thunberg, 1788)
- Udea institalis (Hübner, 1819)
- Udea languidalis (Eversmann, 1842)
- Uresiphita gilvata (Fabricius, 1794)

=== Douglasiidae ===
- Tinagma anchusella (Benander, 1936)
- Tinagma balteolella (Fischer von Röslerstamm, 1841)
- Tinagma columbella Staudinger, 1880
- Tinagma minutissima (Staudinger, 1880)
- Tinagma ocnerostomella (Stainton, 1850)
- Tinagma perdicella Zeller, 1839

=== Drepanidae ===
- Achlya flavicornis (Linnaeus, 1758)
- Cilix asiatica O. Bang-Haas, 1907
- Cilix glaucata (Scopoli, 1763)
- Cymatophorina diluta (Denis & Schiffermüller, 1775)
- Drepana curvatula (Borkhausen, 1790)
- Drepana falcataria (Linnaeus, 1758)
- Falcaria lacertinaria (Linnaeus, 1758)
- Habrosyne pyritoides (Hufnagel, 1766)
- Ochropacha duplaris (Linnaeus, 1761)
- Polyploca ridens (Fabricius, 1787)
- Sabra harpagula (Esper, 1786)
- Tethea ocularis (Linnaeus, 1767)
- Tethea or (Denis & Schiffermüller, 1775)
- Tetheella fluctuosa (Hübner, 1803)
- Thyatira batis (Linnaeus, 1758)
- Watsonalla binaria (Hufnagel, 1767)
- Watsonalla cultraria (Fabricius, 1775)

=== Elachistidae ===
- Agonopterix adspersella (Kollar, 1832)
- Agonopterix alstromeriana (Clerck, 1759)
- Agonopterix angelicella (Hübner, 1813)
- Agonopterix arenella (Denis & Schiffermüller, 1775)
- Agonopterix assimilella (Treitschke, 1832)
- Agonopterix astrantiae (Heinemann, 1870)
- Agonopterix atomella (Denis & Schiffermüller, 1775)
- Agonopterix budashkini Lvovsky, 1998
- Agonopterix capreolella (Zeller, 1839)
- Agonopterix ciliella (Stainton, 1849)
- Agonopterix cnicella (Treitschke, 1832)
- Agonopterix conterminella (Zeller, 1839)
- Agonopterix curvipunctosa (Haworth, 1811)
- Agonopterix ferocella (Chrétien, 1910)
- Agonopterix furvella (Treitschke, 1832)
- Agonopterix heracliana (Linnaeus, 1758)
- Agonopterix hippomarathri (Nickerl, 1864)
- Agonopterix irrorata (Staudinger, 1870)
- Agonopterix kaekeritziana (Linnaeus, 1767)
- Agonopterix laterella (Denis & Schiffermüller, 1775)
- Agonopterix liturosa (Haworth, 1811)
- Agonopterix multiplicella (Erschoff, 1877)
- Agonopterix nervosa (Haworth, 1811)
- Agonopterix nodiflorella (Milliere, 1866)
- Agonopterix ocellana (Fabricius, 1775)
- Agonopterix pallorella (Zeller, 1839)
- Agonopterix propinquella (Treitschke, 1835)
- Agonopterix purpurea (Haworth, 1811)
- Agonopterix putridella (Denis & Schiffermüller, 1775)
- Agonopterix selini (Heinemann, 1870)
- Agonopterix subpropinquella (Stainton, 1849)
- Agonopterix yeatiana (Fabricius, 1781)
- Anchinia daphnella (Denis & Schiffermüller, 1775)
- Blastodacna atra (Haworth, 1828)
- Blastodacna rossica Sinev, 1989
- Chrysoclista lathamella (T. B. Fletcher, 1936)
- Chrysoclista linneella (Clerck, 1759)
- Depressaria absynthiella Herrich-Schäffer, 1865
- Depressaria albipunctella (Denis & Schiffermüller, 1775)
- Depressaria artemisiae Nickerl, 1864
- Depressaria badiella (Hübner, 1796)
- Depressaria bupleurella Heinemann, 1870
- Depressaria chaerophylli Zeller, 1839
- Depressaria daucella (Denis & Schiffermüller, 1775)
- Depressaria depressana (Fabricius, 1775)
- Depressaria discipunctella Herrich-Schäffer, 1854
- Depressaria douglasella Stainton, 1849
- Depressaria emeritella Stainton, 1849
- Depressaria eryngiella Milliere, 1881
- Depressaria libanotidella Schlager, 1849
- Depressaria olerella Zeller, 1854
- Depressaria pimpinellae Zeller, 1839
- Depressaria pulcherrimella Stainton, 1849
- Depressaria radiella (Goeze, 1783)
- Depressaria subalbipunctella Lvovsky, 1981
- Depressaria ultimella Stainton, 1849
- Depressaria velox Staudinger, 1859
- Depressaria dictamnella (Treitschke, 1835)
- Dystebenna stephensi (Stainton, 1849)
- Elachista anitella Traugott-Olsen, 1985
- Elachista chrysodesmella Zeller, 1850
- Elachista deceptricula Staudinger, 1880
- Elachista dispunctella (Duponchel, 1843)
- Elachista dumosa Parenti, 1981
- Elachista exigua Parenti, 1978
- Elachista festucicolella Zeller, 1859
- Elachista gormella Nielsen & Traugott-Olsen, 1987
- Elachista hedemanni Rebel, 1899
- Elachista latipenella Sinev & Budashkin, 1991
- Elachista obliquella Stainton, 1854
- Elachista pollutella Duponchel, 1843
- Elachista pullicomella Zeller, 1839
- Elachista squamosella (Duponchel, 1843)
- Elachista albidella Nylander, 1848
- Elachista atricomella Stainton, 1849
- Elachista biatomella (Stainton, 1848)
- Elachista consortella Stainton, 1851
- Elachista elegans Frey, 1859
- Elachista gleichenella (Fabricius, 1781)
- Elachista griseella (Duponchel, 1843)
- Ethmia aurifluella (Hübner, 1810)
- Ethmia nigrimaculata Sattler, 1967
- Ethmia nigripedella Erschoff, 1877
- Exaeretia lutosella (Herrich-Schäffer, 1854)
- Exaeretia niviferella (Christoph, 1872)
- Exaeretia praeustella (Rebel, 1917)
- Heinemannia festivella (Denis & Schiffermüller, 1775)
- Heinemannia laspeyrella (Hübner, 1796)
- Hypercallia citrinalis (Scopoli, 1763)
- Luquetia lobella (Denis & Schiffermüller, 1775)
- Perittia karadaghella Sinev & Budashkin, 1991
- Semioscopis avellanella (Hübner, 1793)
- Semioscopis oculella (Thunberg, 1794)
- Semioscopis steinkellneriana (Denis & Schiffermüller, 1775)
- Semioscopis strigulana (Denis & Schiffermüller, 1775)
- Spuleria flavicaput (Haworth, 1828)
- Stephensia brunnichella (Linnaeus, 1767)
- Telechrysis tripuncta (Haworth, 1828)

=== Endromidae ===
- Endromis versicolora (Linnaeus, 1758)

=== Epermeniidae ===
- Epermenia chaerophyllella (Goeze, 1783)
- Epermenia illigerella (Hübner, 1813)
- Epermenia insecurella (Stainton, 1854)
- Epermenia strictellus (Wocke, 1867)
- Epermenia iniquellus (Wocke, 1867)
- Epermenia profugella (Stainton, 1856)
- Epermenia ochreomaculellus (Milliere, 1854)
- Epermenia pontificella (Hübner, 1796)
- Epermenia scurella (Stainton, 1851)
- Ochromolopis ictella (Hübner, 1813)
- Ochromolopis zagulajevi Budashkin & Satshkov, 1991
- Phaulernis dentella (Zeller, 1839)
- Phaulernis fulviguttella (Zeller, 1839)

=== Erebidae ===
- Acantholipes regularis (Hübner, 1813)
- Amata kruegeri (Ragusa, 1904)
- Amata nigricornis (Alphéraky, 1883)
- Amata phegea (Linnaeus, 1758)
- Anumeta atrosignata Walker, 1858
- Anumeta cestis (Menetries, 1848)
- Anumeta henkei (Staudinger, 1877)
- Anumeta spilota (Erschoff, 1874)
- Apopestes spectrum (Esper, 1787)
- Arctia caja (Linnaeus, 1758)
- Arctia festiva (Hufnagel, 1766)
- Arctia flavia (Fuessly, 1779)
- Arctia villica (Linnaeus, 1758)
- Arctornis l-nigrum (Muller, 1764)
- Arytrura musculus (Menetries, 1859)
- Atolmis rubricollis (Linnaeus, 1758)
- Autophila asiatica (Staudinger, 1888)
- Autophila dilucida (Hübner, 1808)
- Autophila limbata (Staudinger, 1871)
- Autophila cataphanes (Hübner, 1813)
- Autophila chamaephanes Boursin, 1940
- Callimorpha dominula (Linnaeus, 1758)
- Calliteara pudibunda (Linnaeus, 1758)
- Calymma communimacula (Denis & Schiffermüller, 1775)
- Calyptra thalictri (Borkhausen, 1790)
- Catephia alchymista (Denis & Schiffermüller, 1775)
- Catocala adultera Menetries, 1856
- Catocala conversa (Esper, 1783)
- Catocala deducta Eversmann, 1843
- Catocala dilecta (Hübner, 1808)
- Catocala disjuncta (Geyer, 1828)
- Catocala diversa (Geyer, 1828)
- Catocala electa (Vieweg, 1790)
- Catocala elocata (Esper, 1787)
- Catocala fraxini (Linnaeus, 1758)
- Catocala fulminea (Scopoli, 1763)
- Catocala hymenaea (Denis & Schiffermüller, 1775)
- Catocala lupina Herrich-Schäffer, 1851
- Catocala neonympha (Esper, 1805)
- Catocala nupta (Linnaeus, 1767)
- Catocala nymphaea (Esper, 1787)
- Catocala nymphagoga (Esper, 1787)
- Catocala pacta (Linnaeus, 1758)
- Catocala promissa (Denis & Schiffermüller, 1775)
- Catocala puerpera (Giorna, 1791)
- Catocala sponsa (Linnaeus, 1767)
- Chelis maculosa (Gerning, 1780)
- Clytie syriaca (Bugnion, 1837)
- Colobochyla salicalis (Denis & Schiffermüller, 1775)
- Coscinia cribraria (Linnaeus, 1758)
- Coscinia striata (Linnaeus, 1758)
- Cybosia mesomella (Linnaeus, 1758)
- Diacrisia sannio (Linnaeus, 1758)
- Diaphora mendica (Clerck, 1759)
- Dicallomera fascelina (Linnaeus, 1758)
- Drasteria cailino (Lefebvre, 1827)
- Drasteria caucasica (Kolenati, 1846)
- Drasteria flexuosa (Menetries, 1848)
- Drasteria picta (Christoph, 1877)
- Drasteria rada (Boisduval, 1848)
- Drasteria saisani (Staudinger, 1882)
- Drasteria sesquistria (Eversmann, 1854)
- Drasteria tenera (Staudinger, 1877)
- Dysauxes ancilla (Linnaeus, 1767)
- Dysauxes famula (Freyer, 1836)
- Dysauxes punctata (Fabricius, 1781)
- Dysgonia algira (Linnaeus, 1767)
- Eilema caniola (Hübner, 1808)
- Eilema complana (Linnaeus, 1758)
- Eilema depressa (Esper, 1787)
- Eilema griseola (Hübner, 1803)
- Eilema lurideola (Zincken, 1817)
- Eilema lutarella (Linnaeus, 1758)
- Eilema palliatella (Scopoli, 1763)
- Eilema pseudocomplana (Daniel, 1939)
- Eilema pygmaeola (Doubleday, 1847)
- Eilema sororcula (Hufnagel, 1766)
- Eublemma amasina (Eversmann, 1842)
- Eublemma amoena (Hübner, 1803)
- Eublemma debilis (Christoph, 1884)
- Eublemma gratiosa (Eversmann, 1854)
- Eublemma hansa (Herrich-Schäffer, 1851)
- Eublemma minutata (Fabricius, 1794)
- Eublemma ostrina (Hübner, 1808)
- Eublemma pallidula (Herrich-Schäffer, 1856)
- Eublemma panonica (Freyer, 1840)
- Eublemma parallela (Freyer, 1842)
- Eublemma parva (Hübner, 1808)
- Eublemma polygramma (Duponchel, 1842)
- Eublemma porphyrinia (Freyer, 1845)
- Eublemma pudorina (Staudinger, 1889)
- Eublemma purpurina (Denis & Schiffermüller, 1775)
- Eublemma pusilla (Eversmann, 1834)
- Eublemma rosea (Hübner, 1790)
- Euclidia fortalitium (Tauscher, 1809)
- Euclidia mi (Clerck, 1759)
- Euclidia glyphica (Linnaeus, 1758)
- Euclidia munita (Hübner, 1813)
- Euclidia triquetra (Denis & Schiffermüller, 1775)
- Euplagia quadripunctaria (Poda, 1761)
- Euproctis chrysorrhoea (Linnaeus, 1758)
- Euproctis similis (Fuessly, 1775)
- Exophyla rectangularis (Geyer, 1828)
- Grammodes stolida (Fabricius, 1775)
- Herminia grisealis (Denis & Schiffermüller, 1775)
- Herminia tarsicrinalis (Knoch, 1782)
- Herminia tarsipennalis (Treitschke, 1835)
- Hypena crassalis (Fabricius, 1787)
- Hypena lividalis (Hübner, 1796)
- Hypena obesalis Treitschke, 1829
- Hypena palpalis (Hübner, 1796)
- Hypena proboscidalis (Linnaeus, 1758)
- Hypena rostralis (Linnaeus, 1758)
- Hypenodes crimeana Fibiger, Pekarsky & Ronkay, 2010
- Hypenodes humidalis Doubleday, 1850
- Hyphantria cunea (Drury, 1773)
- Hyphoraia aulica (Linnaeus, 1758)
- Idia calvaria (Denis & Schiffermüller, 1775)
- Lacydes spectabilis (Tauscher, 1806)
- Laelia coenosa (Hübner, 1808)
- Laspeyria flexula (Denis & Schiffermüller, 1775)
- Leucoma salicis (Linnaeus, 1758)
- Lithosia quadra (Linnaeus, 1758)
- Lygephila craccae (Denis & Schiffermüller, 1775)
- Lygephila lubrica (Freyer, 1842)
- Lygephila ludicra (Hübner, 1790)
- Lygephila lusoria (Linnaeus, 1758)
- Lygephila pastinum (Treitschke, 1826)
- Lygephila procax (Hübner, 1813)
- Lygephila viciae (Hübner, 1822)
- Lymantria dispar (Linnaeus, 1758)
- Lymantria monacha (Linnaeus, 1758)
- Macrochilo cribrumalis (Hübner, 1793)
- Miltochrista miniata (Forster, 1771)
- Minucia lunaris (Denis & Schiffermüller, 1775)
- Nudaria mundana (Linnaeus, 1761)
- Ocnogyna parasita (Hübner, 1790)
- Orectis proboscidata (Herrich-Schäffer, 1851)
- Orgyia antiquoides (Hübner, 1822)
- Orgyia dubia (Tauscher, 1806)
- Orgyia recens (Hübner, 1819)
- Orgyia antiqua (Linnaeus, 1758)
- Paracolax tristalis (Fabricius, 1794)
- Parascotia fuliginaria (Linnaeus, 1761)
- Parasemia plantaginis (Linnaeus, 1758)
- Parocneria detrita (Esper, 1785)
- Pechipogo plumigeralis Hübner, 1825
- Pechipogo strigilata (Linnaeus, 1758)
- Pelosia muscerda (Hufnagel, 1766)
- Pelosia obtusa (Herrich-Schäffer, 1852)
- Pericallia matronula (Linnaeus, 1758)
- Pericyma albidentaria (Freyer, 1842)
- Phragmatobia fuliginosa (Linnaeus, 1758)
- Phragmatobia luctifera (Denis & Schiffermüller, 1775)
- Phragmatobia placida (Frivaldszky, 1835)
- Phytometra viridaria (Clerck, 1759)
- Polypogon gryphalis (Herrich-Schäffer, 1851)
- Polypogon tentacularia (Linnaeus, 1758)
- Raparna conicephala (Staudinger, 1870)
- Rhyparia purpurata (Linnaeus, 1758)
- Rhyparioides metelkana (Lederer, 1861)
- Rivula sericealis (Scopoli, 1763)
- Schrankia balneorum (Alphéraky, 1880)
- Schrankia costaestrigalis (Stephens, 1834)
- Schrankia taenialis (Hübner, 1809)
- Scoliopteryx libatrix (Linnaeus, 1758)
- Setina irrorella (Linnaeus, 1758)
- Setina roscida (Denis & Schiffermüller, 1775)
- Simplicia rectalis (Eversmann, 1842)
- Spilosoma lubricipeda (Linnaeus, 1758)
- Spilosoma lutea (Hufnagel, 1766)
- Spilosoma urticae (Esper, 1789)
- Thumatha senex (Hübner, 1808)
- Trisateles emortualis (Denis & Schiffermüller, 1775)
- Tyria jacobaeae (Linnaeus, 1758)
- Utetheisa pulchella (Linnaeus, 1758)
- Watsonarctia deserta (Bartel, 1902)
- Zanclognatha lunalis (Scopoli, 1763)
- Zanclognatha zelleralis (Wocke, 1850)
- Zekelita ravalis (Herrich-Schäffer, 1851)
- Zekelita ravulalis (Staudinger, 1879)
- Zekelita antiqualis (Hübner, 1809)

=== Eriocottidae ===
- Deuterotinea casanella (Eversmann, 1844)

=== Eriocraniidae ===
- Dyseriocrania subpurpurella (Haworth, 1828)
- Eriocrania sparrmannella (Bosc, 1791)

=== Euteliidae ===
- Eutelia adoratrix (Staudinger, 1892)
- Eutelia adulatrix (Hübner, 1813)

=== Gelechiidae ===
- Acompsia cinerella (Clerck, 1759)
- Acompsia tripunctella (Denis & Schiffermüller, 1775)
- Acompsia schmidtiellus (Heyden, 1848)
- Altenia scriptella (Hübner, 1796)
- Anacampsis blattariella (Hübner, 1796)
- Anacampsis obscurella (Denis & Schiffermüller, 1775)
- Anacampsis populella (Clerck, 1759)
- Anacampsis scintillella (Fischer von Röslerstamm, 1841)
- Anacampsis temerella (Lienig & Zeller, 1846)
- Anacampsis timidella (Wocke, 1887)
- Anarsia eleagnella Kuznetsov, 1957
- Anarsia lineatella Zeller, 1839
- Anarsia spartiella (Schrank, 1802)
- Anasphaltis renigerellus (Zeller, 1839)
- Apodia bifractella (Duponchel, 1843)
- Aproaerema anthyllidella (Hübner, 1813)
- Argolamprotes micella (Denis & Schiffermüller, 1775)
- Aristotelia brizella (Treitschke, 1833)
- Aristotelia calastomella (Christoph, 1873)
- Aristotelia ericinella (Zeller, 1839)
- Aristotelia mirabilis (Christoph, 1888)
- Aristotelia staticella Milliere, 1876
- Aristotelia subdecurtella (Stainton, 1859)
- Aristotelia subericinella (Duponchel, 1843)
- Aroga aristotelis (Milliere, 1876)
- Aroga flavicomella (Zeller, 1839)
- Aroga velocella (Duponchel, 1838)
- Athrips amoenella (Frey, 1882)
- Athrips mouffetella (Linnaeus, 1758)
- Athrips nigricostella (Duponchel, 1842)
- Athrips patockai (Povolny, 1979)
- Athrips rancidella (Herrich-Schäffer, 1854)
- Athrips spiraeae (Staudinger, 1871)
- Athrips stepposa Bidzilya, 2005
- Athrips tetrapunctella (Thunberg, 1794)
- Atremaea lonchoptera Staudinger, 1871
- Brachmia blandella (Fabricius, 1798)
- Brachmia dimidiella (Denis & Schiffermüller, 1775)
- Brachmia inornatella (Douglas, 1850)
- Bryotropha affinis (Haworth, 1828)
- Bryotropha azovica Bidzilia, 1997
- Bryotropha desertella (Douglas, 1850)
- Bryotropha hendrikseni Karsholt & Rutten, 2005
- Bryotropha patockai Elsner & Karsholt, 2003
- Bryotropha rossica Anikin & Piskunov, 1996
- Bryotropha senectella (Zeller, 1839)
- Bryotropha similis (Stainton, 1854)
- Bryotropha tachyptilella (Rebel, 1916)
- Bryotropha terrella (Denis & Schiffermüller, 1775)
- Carpatolechia aenigma (Sattler, 1983)
- Carpatolechia alburnella (Zeller, 1839)
- Carpatolechia decorella (Haworth, 1812)
- Carpatolechia fugitivella (Zeller, 1839)
- Carpatolechia notatella (Hübner, 1813)
- Carpatolechia proximella (Hübner, 1796)
- Caryocolum alsinella (Zeller, 1868)
- Caryocolum amaurella (M. Hering, 1924)
- Caryocolum blandella (Douglas, 1852)
- Caryocolum blandelloides Karsholt, 1981
- Caryocolum blandulella (Tutt, 1887)
- Caryocolum cassella (Walker, 1864)
- Caryocolum fischerella (Treitschke, 1833)
- Caryocolum fraternella (Douglas, 1851)
- Caryocolum huebneri (Haworth, 1828)
- Caryocolum junctella (Douglas, 1851)
- Caryocolum kroesmanniella (Herrich-Schäffer, 1854)
- Caryocolum leucomelanella (Zeller, 1839)
- Caryocolum peregrinella (Herrich-Schäffer, 1854)
- Caryocolum proxima (Haworth, 1828)
- Caryocolum pullatella (Tengstrom, 1848)
- Caryocolum tricolorella (Haworth, 1812)
- Caulastrocecis furfurella (Staudinger, 1871)
- Chionodes continuella (Zeller, 1839)
- Chionodes distinctella (Zeller, 1839)
- Chionodes electella (Zeller, 1839)
- Chionodes fumatella (Douglas, 1850)
- Chionodes holosericella (Herrich-Schäffer, 1854)
- Chionodes luctuella (Hübner, 1793)
- Chionodes mongolica Piskunov, 1979
- Chrysoesthia drurella (Fabricius, 1775)
- Chrysoesthia falkovitshi Lvovsky & Piskunov, 1989
- Chrysoesthia sexguttella (Thunberg, 1794)
- Cosmardia moritzella (Treitschke, 1835)
- Crossobela trinotella (Herrich-Schäffer, 1856)
- Dactylotula kinkerella (Snellen, 1876)
- Dichomeris alacella (Zeller, 1839)
- Dichomeris barbella (Denis & Schiffermüller, 1775)
- Dichomeris derasella (Denis & Schiffermüller, 1775)
- Dichomeris juniperella (Linnaeus, 1761)
- Dichomeris latipennella (Rebel, 1937)
- Dichomeris limosellus (Schlager, 1849)
- Dichomeris marginella (Fabricius, 1781)
- Dichomeris rasilella (Herrich-Schäffer, 1854)
- Dichomeris ustalella (Fabricius, 1794)
- Dirhinosia cervinella (Eversmann, 1844)
- Ephysteris deserticolella (Staudinger, 1871)
- Ephysteris inustella (Zeller, 1847)
- Ephysteris promptella (Staudinger, 1859)
- Eulamprotes atrella (Denis & Schiffermüller, 1775)
- Eulamprotes nigromaculella (Milliere, 1872)
- Eulamprotes superbella (Zeller, 1839)
- Eulamprotes unicolorella (Duponchel, 1843)
- Eulamprotes wilkella (Linnaeus, 1758)
- Exoteleia dodecella (Linnaeus, 1758)
- Filatima spurcella (Duponchel, 1843)
- Filatima tephritidella (Duponchel, 1844)
- Filatima ukrainica Piskunov, 1971
- Gelechia basipunctella Herrich-Schäffer, 1854
- Gelechia cuneatella Douglas, 1852
- Gelechia hippophaella (Schrank, 1802)
- Gelechia jakovlevi Krulikovsky, 1905
- Gelechia muscosella Zeller, 1839
- Gelechia nigra (Haworth, 1828)
- Gelechia rhombella (Denis & Schiffermüller, 1775)
- Gelechia rhombelliformis Staudinger, 1871
- Gelechia sabinellus (Zeller, 1839)
- Gelechia scotinella Herrich-Schäffer, 1854
- Gelechia senticetella (Staudinger, 1859)
- Gelechia sestertiella Herrich-Schäffer, 1854
- Gelechia sororculella (Hübner, 1817)
- Gelechia turpella (Denis & Schiffermüller, 1775)
- Gnorimoschema herbichii (Nowicki, 1864)
- Gnorimoschema nupponeni Huemer & Karsholt, 2010
- Helcystogramma albinervis (Gerasimov, 1929)
- Helcystogramma arulensis (Rebel, 1929)
- Helcystogramma lineolella (Zeller, 1839)
- Helcystogramma lutatella (Herrich-Schäffer, 1854)
- Helcystogramma rufescens (Haworth, 1828)
- Helcystogramma triannulella (Herrich-Schäffer, 1854)
- Holcophora statices Staudinger, 1871
- Hypatima rhomboidella (Linnaeus, 1758)
- Isophrictis anthemidella (Wocke, 1871)
- Isophrictis striatella (Denis & Schiffermüller, 1775)
- Istrianis femoralis (Staudinger, 1876)
- Ivanauskiella psamathias (Meyrick, 1891)
- Iwaruna biguttella (Duponchel, 1843)
- Klimeschiopsis kiningerella (Duponchel, 1843)
- Lutilabria lutilabrella (Mann, 1857)
- Megacraspedus argyroneurellus Staudinger, 1871
- Megacraspedus balneariellus (Chrétien, 1907)
- Megacraspedus binotella (Duponchel, 1843)
- Megacraspedus dolosellus (Zeller, 1839)
- Megacraspedus fallax (Mann, 1867)
- Megacraspedus lanceolellus (Zeller, 1850)
- Megacraspedus separatellus (Fischer von Röslerstamm, 1843)
- Mesophleps silacella (Hübner, 1796)
- Metanarsia modesta Staudinger, 1871
- Metzneria aprilella (Herrich-Schäffer, 1854)
- Metzneria diffusella Englert, 1974
- Metzneria ehikeella Gozmany, 1954
- Metzneria lappella (Linnaeus, 1758)
- Metzneria metzneriella (Stainton, 1851)
- Metzneria neuropterella (Zeller, 1839)
- Metzneria santolinella (Amsel, 1936)
- Metzneria subflavella Englert, 1974
- Mirificarma cytisella (Treitschke, 1833)
- Mirificarma eburnella (Denis & Schiffermüller, 1775)
- Mirificarma lentiginosella (Zeller, 1839)
- Mirificarma maculatella (Hübner, 1796)
- Mirificarma mulinella (Zeller, 1839)
- Monochroa arundinetella (Boyd, 1857)
- Monochroa conspersella (Herrich-Schäffer, 1854)
- Monochroa cytisella (Curtis, 1837)
- Monochroa divisella (Douglas, 1850)
- Monochroa elongella (Heinemann, 1870)
- Monochroa hornigi (Staudinger, 1883)
- Monochroa lucidella (Stephens, 1834)
- Monochroa lutulentella (Zeller, 1839)
- Monochroa niphognatha (Gozmany, 1953)
- Monochroa nomadella (Zeller, 1868)
- Monochroa palustrellus (Douglas, 1850)
- Monochroa parvulata (Gozmany, 1957)
- Monochroa sepicolella (Herrich-Schäffer, 1854)
- Monochroa servella (Zeller, 1839)
- Monochroa tenebrella (Hübner, 1817)
- Neofaculta ericetella (Geyer, 1832)
- Neofaculta infernella (Herrich-Schäffer, 1854)
- Neofriseria peliella (Treitschke, 1835)
- Neotelphusa sequax (Haworth, 1828)
- Nothris lemniscellus (Zeller, 1839)
- Nothris verbascella (Denis & Schiffermüller, 1775)
- Ornativalva heluanensis (Debski, 1913)
- Ornativalva plutelliformis (Staudinger, 1859)
- Parachronistis albiceps (Zeller, 1839)
- Pexicopia malvella (Hübner, 1805)
- Phthorimaea operculella (Zeller, 1873)
- Platyedra subcinerea (Haworth, 1828)
- Prolita solutella (Zeller, 1839)
- Psamathocrita osseella (Stainton, 1860)
- Pseudotelphusa istrella (Mann, 1866)
- Pseudotelphusa paripunctella (Thunberg, 1794)
- Pseudotelphusa scalella (Scopoli, 1763)
- Psoricoptera gibbosella (Zeller, 1839)
- Ptocheuusa abnormella (Herrich-Schäffer, 1854)
- Ptocheuusa inopella (Zeller, 1839)
- Pyncostola bohemiella (Nickerl, 1864)
- Recurvaria leucatella (Clerck, 1759)
- Recurvaria nanella (Denis & Schiffermüller, 1775)
- Schneidereria pistaciella Weber, 1957
- Scrobipalpa acuminatella (Sircom, 1850)
- Scrobipalpa acuta (Povolny, 2001)
- Scrobipalpa adaptata (Povolny, 2001)
- Scrobipalpa arenbergeri Povolny, 1973
- Scrobipalpa artemisiella (Treitschke, 1833)
- Scrobipalpa atriplicella (Fischer von Röslerstamm, 1841)
- Scrobipalpa brahmiella (Heyden, 1862)
- Scrobipalpa bryophiloides Povolny, 1966
- Scrobipalpa chetitica Povolny, 1974
- Scrobipalpa erichi Povolny, 1964
- Scrobipalpa hungariae (Staudinger, 1871)
- Scrobipalpa indignella (Staudinger, 1879)
- Scrobipalpa karadaghi (Povolny, 2001)
- Scrobipalpa magnificella Povolny, 1967
- Scrobipalpa mixta Huemer & Karsholt, 2010
- Scrobipalpa monochromella (Constant, 1895)
- Scrobipalpa nitentella (Fuchs, 1902)
- Scrobipalpa obsoletella (Fischer von Röslerstamm, 1841)
- Scrobipalpa ocellatella (Boyd, 1858)
- Scrobipalpa pauperella (Heinemann, 1870)
- Scrobipalpa proclivella (Fuchs, 1886)
- Scrobipalpa rebeli (Preissecker, 1914)
- Scrobipalpa salicorniae (E. Hering, 1889)
- Scrobipalpa selectella (Caradja, 1920)
- Scrobipalpa solitaria Povolny, 1969
- Scrobipalpa ustulatella (Staudinger, 1871)
- Scrobipalpula psilella (Herrich-Schäffer, 1854)
- Scrobipalpula tussilaginis (Stainton, 1867)
- Sitotroga cerealella (Olivier, 1789)
- Sophronia chilonella (Treitschke, 1833)
- Sophronia consanguinella Herrich-Schäffer, 1854
- Sophronia humerella (Denis & Schiffermüller, 1775)
- Sophronia marginella Toll, 1936
- Sophronia semicostella (Hübner, 1813)
- Sophronia sicariellus (Zeller, 1839)
- Stenolechia gemmella (Linnaeus, 1758)
- Stomopteryx detersella (Zeller, 1847)
- Streyella anguinella (Herrich-Schäffer, 1861)
- Syncopacma albifrontella (Heinemann, 1870)
- Syncopacma cinctella (Clerck, 1759)
- Syncopacma cincticulella (Bruand, 1851)
- Syncopacma coronillella (Treitschke, 1833)
- Syncopacma incognitana Gozmany, 1957
- Syncopacma linella (Chrétien, 1904)
- Syncopacma montanata Gozmany, 1957
- Syncopacma ochrofasciella (Toll, 1936)
- Syncopacma patruella (Mann, 1857)
- Syncopacma sangiella (Stainton, 1863)
- Syncopacma semicostella (Staudinger, 1871)
- Syncopacma taeniolella (Zeller, 1839)
- Syncopacma vinella (Bankes, 1898)
- Syncopacma wormiella (Wolff, 1958)
- Teleiodes luculella (Hübner, 1813)
- Teleiodes vulgella (Denis & Schiffermüller, 1775)
- Teleiodes wagae (Nowicki, 1860)
- Teleiopsis bagriotella (Duponchel, 1840)
- Teleiopsis diffinis (Haworth, 1828)
- Thiotricha subocellea (Stephens, 1834)
- Turcopalpa glaseri Povolny, 1973
- Vladimirea glebicolorella (Erschoff, 1874)
- Xystophora carchariella (Zeller, 1839)

=== Geometridae ===
- Abraxas grossulariata (Linnaeus, 1758)
- Abraxas sylvata (Scopoli, 1763)
- Acasis appensata (Eversmann, 1842)
- Acasis viretata (Hübner, 1799)
- Aethalura punctulata (Denis & Schiffermüller, 1775)
- Agriopis aurantiaria (Hübner, 1799)
- Agriopis bajaria (Denis & Schiffermüller, 1775)
- Agriopis budashkini Kostyuk, 2009
- Agriopis leucophaearia (Denis & Schiffermüller, 1775)
- Agriopis marginaria (Fabricius, 1776)
- Alcis repandata (Linnaeus, 1758)
- Alsophila aceraria (Denis & Schiffermüller, 1775)
- Alsophila aescularia (Denis & Schiffermüller, 1775)
- Angerona prunaria (Linnaeus, 1758)
- Anticlea derivata (Denis & Schiffermüller, 1775)
- Anticollix sparsata (Treitschke, 1828)
- Apeira syringaria (Linnaeus, 1758)
- Aplasta ononaria (Fuessly, 1783)
- Aplocera annexata (Freyer, 1830)
- Aplocera columbata (Metzner, 1845)
- Aplocera efformata (Guenee, 1858)
- Aplocera plagiata (Linnaeus, 1758)
- Aplocera praeformata (Hübner, 1826)
- Apocheima hispidaria (Denis & Schiffermüller, 1775)
- Apochima flabellaria (Heeger, 1838)
- Archiearis parthenias (Linnaeus, 1761)
- Arichanna melanaria (Linnaeus, 1758)
- Artiora evonymaria (Denis & Schiffermüller, 1775)
- Ascotis selenaria (Denis & Schiffermüller, 1775)
- Aspitates gilvaria (Denis & Schiffermüller, 1775)
- Aspitates ochrearia (Rossi, 1794)
- Asthena albulata (Hufnagel, 1767)
- Asthena anseraria (Herrich-Schäffer, 1855)
- Baptria tibiale (Esper, 1791)
- Biston achyra Wehrli, 1936
- Biston betularia (Linnaeus, 1758)
- Biston strataria (Hufnagel, 1767)
- Boudinotiana notha (Hübner, 1803)
- Boudinotiana puella (Esper, 1787)
- Bupalus piniaria (Linnaeus, 1758)
- Cabera exanthemata (Scopoli, 1763)
- Cabera pusaria (Linnaeus, 1758)
- Campaea margaritaria (Linnaeus, 1761)
- Camptogramma bilineata (Linnaeus, 1758)
- Casilda antophilaria (Hübner, 1813)
- Cataclysme riguata (Hübner, 1813)
- Catarhoe cuculata (Hufnagel, 1767)
- Catarhoe rubidata (Denis & Schiffermüller, 1775)
- Cepphis advenaria (Hübner, 1790)
- Chariaspilates formosaria (Eversmann, 1837)
- Charissa obscurata (Denis & Schiffermüller, 1775)
- Charissa variegata (Duponchel, 1830)
- Chesias rufata (Fabricius, 1775)
- Chiasmia aestimaria (Hübner, 1809)
- Chiasmia clathrata (Linnaeus, 1758)
- Chlorissa cloraria (Hübner, 1813)
- Chlorissa viridata (Linnaeus, 1758)
- Chloroclysta siterata (Hufnagel, 1767)
- Chloroclystis v-ata (Haworth, 1809)
- Cidaria fulvata (Forster, 1771)
- Cleora cinctaria (Denis & Schiffermüller, 1775)
- Cleorodes lichenaria (Hufnagel, 1767)
- Cleta filacearia (Herrich-Schäffer, 1847)
- Cleta perpusillaria (Eversmann, 1847)
- Coenocalpe lapidata (Hübner, 1809)
- Coenotephria ablutaria (Boisduval, 1840)
- Coenotephria salicata (Denis & Schiffermüller, 1775)
- Colostygia aptata (Hübner, 1813)
- Colostygia olivata (Denis & Schiffermüller, 1775)
- Colostygia pectinataria (Knoch, 1781)
- Colostygia turbata (Hübner, 1799)
- Colotois pennaria (Linnaeus, 1761)
- Comibaena bajularia (Denis & Schiffermüller, 1775)
- Cosmorhoe ocellata (Linnaeus, 1758)
- Costaconvexa polygrammata (Borkhausen, 1794)
- Crocallis elinguaria (Linnaeus, 1758)
- Crocallis tusciaria (Borkhausen, 1793)
- Cyclophora linearia (Hübner, 1799)
- Cyclophora porata (Linnaeus, 1767)
- Cyclophora punctaria (Linnaeus, 1758)
- Cyclophora albiocellaria (Hübner, 1789)
- Cyclophora albipunctata (Hufnagel, 1767)
- Cyclophora annularia (Fabricius, 1775)
- Cyclophora pendularia (Clerck, 1759)
- Cyclophora puppillaria (Hübner, 1799)
- Cyclophora quercimontaria (Bastelberger, 1897)
- Dyscia innocentaria (Christoph, 1885)
- Dysstroma citrata (Linnaeus, 1761)
- Dysstroma truncata (Hufnagel, 1767)
- Earophila badiata (Denis & Schiffermüller, 1775)
- Ecliptopera capitata (Herrich-Schäffer, 1839)
- Ecliptopera silaceata (Denis & Schiffermüller, 1775)
- Ectropis crepuscularia (Denis & Schiffermüller, 1775)
- Eilicrinia cordiaria (Hübner, 1790)
- Eilicrinia trinotata (Metzner, 1845)
- Electrophaes corylata (Thunberg, 1792)
- Ematurga atomaria (Linnaeus, 1758)
- Enanthyperythra legataria (Herrich-Schäffer, 1852)
- Ennomos alniaria (Linnaeus, 1758)
- Ennomos autumnaria (Werneburg, 1859)
- Ennomos erosaria (Denis & Schiffermüller, 1775)
- Ennomos fuscantaria (Haworth, 1809)
- Ennomos quercaria (Hübner, 1813)
- Ennomos quercinaria (Hufnagel, 1767)
- Entephria caesiata (Denis & Schiffermüller, 1775)
- Entephria cyanata (Hübner, 1809)
- Epione repandaria (Hufnagel, 1767)
- Epione vespertaria (Linnaeus, 1767)
- Epirrhoe alternata (Muller, 1764)
- Epirrhoe galiata (Denis & Schiffermüller, 1775)
- Epirrhoe molluginata (Hübner, 1813)
- Epirrhoe rivata (Hübner, 1813)
- Epirrhoe tristata (Linnaeus, 1758)
- Epirrita autumnata (Borkhausen, 1794)
- Epirrita dilutata (Denis & Schiffermüller, 1775)
- Erannis defoliaria (Clerck, 1759)
- Euchoeca nebulata (Scopoli, 1763)
- Eulithis mellinata (Fabricius, 1787)
- Eulithis populata (Linnaeus, 1758)
- Eulithis prunata (Linnaeus, 1758)
- Eulithis testata (Linnaeus, 1761)
- Eumannia oppositaria (Mann, 1864)
- Euphyia biangulata (Haworth, 1809)
- Euphyia unangulata (Haworth, 1809)
- Eupithecia abbreviata Stephens, 1831
- Eupithecia abietaria (Goeze, 1781)
- Eupithecia absinthiata (Clerck, 1759)
- Eupithecia actaeata Walderdorff, 1869
- Eupithecia addictata Dietze, 1908
- Eupithecia alliaria Staudinger, 1870
- Eupithecia analoga Djakonov, 1926
- Eupithecia assimilata Doubleday, 1856
- Eupithecia biornata Christoph, 1867
- Eupithecia cauchiata (Duponchel, 1831)
- Eupithecia centaureata (Denis & Schiffermüller, 1775)
- Eupithecia denotata (Hübner, 1813)
- Eupithecia denticulata (Treitschke, 1828)
- Eupithecia distinctaria Herrich-Schäffer, 1848
- Eupithecia dodoneata Guenee, 1858
- Eupithecia egenaria Herrich-Schäffer, 1848
- Eupithecia ericeata (Rambur, 1833)
- Eupithecia exiguata (Hübner, 1813)
- Eupithecia extensaria (Freyer, 1844)
- Eupithecia extraversaria Herrich-Schäffer, 1852
- Eupithecia graphata (Treitschke, 1828)
- Eupithecia gratiosata Herrich-Schäffer, 1861
- Eupithecia gueneata Milliere, 1862
- Eupithecia haworthiata Doubleday, 1856
- Eupithecia icterata (de Villers, 1789)
- Eupithecia indigata (Hübner, 1813)
- Eupithecia innotata (Hufnagel, 1767)
- Eupithecia insigniata (Hübner, 1790)
- Eupithecia intricata (Zetterstedt, 1839)
- Eupithecia inturbata (Hübner, 1817)
- Eupithecia karadaghensis Mironov, 1988
- Eupithecia lariciata (Freyer, 1841)
- Eupithecia linariata (Denis & Schiffermüller, 1775)
- Eupithecia millefoliata Rossler, 1866
- Eupithecia minusculata Alphéraky, 1882
- Eupithecia mystica Dietze, 1910
- Eupithecia nachadira Brandt, 1941
- Eupithecia nanata (Hübner, 1813)
- Eupithecia ochridata Schutze & Pinker, 1968
- Eupithecia oxycedrata (Rambur, 1833)
- Eupithecia pauxillaria Boisduval, 1840
- Eupithecia pernotata Guenee, 1858
- Eupithecia pimpinellata (Hübner, 1813)
- Eupithecia plumbeolata (Haworth, 1809)
- Eupithecia pusillata (Denis & Schiffermüller, 1775)
- Eupithecia pygmaeata (Hübner, 1799)
- Eupithecia pyreneata Mabille, 1871
- Eupithecia quercetica Prout, 1938
- Eupithecia satyrata (Hübner, 1813)
- Eupithecia schiefereri Bohatsch, 1893
- Eupithecia selinata Herrich-Schäffer, 1861
- Eupithecia semigraphata Bruand, 1850
- Eupithecia simpliciata (Haworth, 1809)
- Eupithecia sinuosaria (Eversmann, 1848)
- Eupithecia spadiceata Zerny, 1933
- Eupithecia spissilineata (Metzner, 1846)
- Eupithecia subfuscata (Haworth, 1809)
- Eupithecia subumbrata (Denis & Schiffermüller, 1775)
- Eupithecia succenturiata (Linnaeus, 1758)
- Eupithecia tantillaria Boisduval, 1840
- Eupithecia tenuiata (Hübner, 1813)
- Eupithecia tripunctaria Herrich-Schäffer, 1852
- Eupithecia trisignaria Herrich-Schäffer, 1848
- Eupithecia variostrigata Alphéraky, 1876
- Eupithecia venosata (Fabricius, 1787)
- Eupithecia veratraria Herrich-Schäffer, 1848
- Eupithecia virgaureata Doubleday, 1861
- Eupithecia vulgata (Haworth, 1809)
- Eustroma reticulata (Denis & Schiffermüller, 1775)
- Gagitodes sagittata (Fabricius, 1787)
- Gandaritis pyraliata (Denis & Schiffermüller, 1775)
- Geometra papilionaria (Linnaeus, 1758)
- Gnophos sartata Treitschke, 1827
- Gnophos dumetata Treitschke, 1827
- Gymnoscelis rufifasciata (Haworth, 1809)
- Heliomata glarearia (Denis & Schiffermüller, 1775)
- Hemistola chrysoprasaria (Esper, 1795)
- Hemithea aestivaria (Hübner, 1789)
- Horisme aemulata (Hübner, 1813)
- Horisme aquata (Hübner, 1813)
- Horisme corticata (Treitschke, 1835)
- Horisme tersata (Denis & Schiffermüller, 1775)
- Horisme vitalbata (Denis & Schiffermüller, 1775)
- Hydrelia flammeolaria (Hufnagel, 1767)
- Hydrelia sylvata (Denis & Schiffermüller, 1775)
- Hydria cervinalis (Scopoli, 1763)
- Hydria undulata (Linnaeus, 1758)
- Hydriomena furcata (Thunberg, 1784)
- Hydriomena impluviata (Denis & Schiffermüller, 1775)
- Hylaea fasciaria (Linnaeus, 1758)
- Hypomecis punctinalis (Scopoli, 1763)
- Hypomecis roboraria (Denis & Schiffermüller, 1775)
- Hypoxystis pluviaria (Fabricius, 1787)
- Idaea aureolaria (Denis & Schiffermüller, 1775)
- Idaea aversata (Linnaeus, 1758)
- Idaea biselata (Hufnagel, 1767)
- Idaea camparia (Herrich-Schäffer, 1852)
- Idaea degeneraria (Hübner, 1799)
- Idaea descitaria (Christoph, 1893)
- Idaea deversaria (Herrich-Schäffer, 1847)
- Idaea dimidiata (Hufnagel, 1767)
- Idaea emarginata (Linnaeus, 1758)
- Idaea fuscovenosa (Goeze, 1781)
- Idaea humiliata (Hufnagel, 1767)
- Idaea inquinata (Scopoli, 1763)
- Idaea laevigata (Scopoli, 1763)
- Idaea mancipiata (Staudinger, 1871)
- Idaea moniliata (Denis & Schiffermüller, 1775)
- Idaea muricata (Hufnagel, 1767)
- Idaea nitidata (Herrich-Schäffer, 1861)
- Idaea obsoletaria (Rambur, 1833)
- Idaea ochrata (Scopoli, 1763)
- Idaea ossiculata (Lederer, 1870)
- Idaea pallidata (Denis & Schiffermüller, 1775)
- Idaea politaria (Hübner, 1799)
- Idaea rufaria (Hübner, 1799)
- Idaea rusticata (Denis & Schiffermüller, 1775)
- Idaea seriata (Schrank, 1802)
- Idaea sericeata (Hübner, 1813)
- Idaea serpentata (Hufnagel, 1767)
- Idaea straminata (Borkhausen, 1794)
- Idaea subsericeata (Haworth, 1809)
- Idaea sylvestraria (Hübner, 1799)
- Idaea trigeminata (Haworth, 1809)
- Isturgia arenacearia (Denis & Schiffermüller, 1775)
- Isturgia murinaria (Denis & Schiffermüller, 1775)
- Ithysia pravata (Hübner, 1813)
- Jodis lactearia (Linnaeus, 1758)
- Jodis putata (Linnaeus, 1758)
- Lampropteryx otregiata (Metcalfe, 1917)
- Lampropteryx suffumata (Denis & Schiffermüller, 1775)
- Larentia clavaria (Haworth, 1809)
- Ligdia adustata (Denis & Schiffermüller, 1775)
- Lithostege coassata (Hübner, 1825)
- Lithostege farinata (Hufnagel, 1767)
- Lithostege griseata (Denis & Schiffermüller, 1775)
- Lithostege odessaria (Boisduval, 1848)
- Lobophora halterata (Hufnagel, 1767)
- Lomaspilis marginata (Linnaeus, 1758)
- Lomaspilis opis Butler, 1878
- Lomographa bimaculata (Fabricius, 1775)
- Lomographa temerata (Denis & Schiffermüller, 1775)
- Lycia hirtaria (Clerck, 1759)
- Lycia zonaria (Denis & Schiffermüller, 1775)
- Lythria cruentaria (Hufnagel, 1767)
- Lythria purpuraria (Linnaeus, 1758)
- Macaria alternata (Denis & Schiffermüller, 1775)
- Macaria artesiaria (Denis & Schiffermüller, 1775)
- Macaria brunneata (Thunberg, 1784)
- Macaria liturata (Clerck, 1759)
- Macaria notata (Linnaeus, 1758)
- Macaria wauaria (Linnaeus, 1758)
- Martania taeniata (Stephens, 1831)
- Megaspilates mundataria (Stoll, 1782)
- Melanthia alaudaria (Freyer, 1846)
- Melanthia procellata (Denis & Schiffermüller, 1775)
- Mesoleuca albicillata (Linnaeus, 1758)
- Mesotype parallelolineata (Retzius, 1783)
- Microloxia herbaria (Hübner, 1813)
- Minoa murinata (Scopoli, 1763)
- Narraga fasciolaria (Hufnagel, 1767)
- Nebula achromaria (de La Harpe, 1853)
- Nebula nebulata (Treitschke, 1828)
- Nebula senectaria (Herrich-Schäffer, 1852)
- Nothocasis sertata (Hübner, 1817)
- Nycterosea obstipata (Fabricius, 1794)
- Odezia atrata (Linnaeus, 1758)
- Odontopera bidentata (Clerck, 1759)
- Operophtera brumata (Linnaeus, 1758)
- Operophtera fagata (Scharfenberg, 1805)
- Opisthograptis luteolata (Linnaeus, 1758)
- Orthonama vittata (Borkhausen, 1794)
- Orthostixis cribraria (Hübner, 1799)
- Ourapteryx sambucaria (Linnaeus, 1758)
- Parectropis similaria (Hufnagel, 1767)
- Pareulype berberata (Denis & Schiffermüller, 1775)
- Pasiphila chloerata (Mabille, 1870)
- Pasiphila debiliata (Hübner, 1817)
- Pasiphila rectangulata (Linnaeus, 1758)
- Pelurga comitata (Linnaeus, 1758)
- Pennithera firmata (Hübner, 1822)
- Perconia strigillaria (Hübner, 1787)
- Peribatodes correptaria (Zeller, 1847)
- Peribatodes rhomboidaria (Denis & Schiffermüller, 1775)
- Peribatodes umbraria (Hübner, 1809)
- Perizoma affinitata (Stephens, 1831)
- Perizoma albulata (Denis & Schiffermüller, 1775)
- Perizoma alchemillata (Linnaeus, 1758)
- Perizoma bifaciata (Haworth, 1809)
- Perizoma blandiata (Denis & Schiffermüller, 1775)
- Perizoma flavofasciata (Thunberg, 1792)
- Perizoma hydrata (Treitschke, 1829)
- Perizoma lugdunaria (Herrich-Schäffer, 1855)
- Perizoma minorata (Treitschke, 1828)
- Petrophora chlorosata (Scopoli, 1763)
- Phaiogramma etruscaria (Zeller, 1849)
- Phibalapteryx virgata (Hufnagel, 1767)
- Phigalia pilosaria (Denis & Schiffermüller, 1775)
- Philereme transversata (Hufnagel, 1767)
- Philereme vetulata (Denis & Schiffermüller, 1775)
- Plagodis dolabraria (Linnaeus, 1767)
- Plagodis pulveraria (Linnaeus, 1758)
- Plemyria rubiginata (Denis & Schiffermüller, 1775)
- Protorhoe corollaria (Herrich-Schäffer, 1848)
- Protorhoe unicata (Guenee, 1858)
- Pseudopanthera macularia (Linnaeus, 1758)
- Pseudoterpna pruinata (Hufnagel, 1767)
- Pterapherapteryx sexalata (Retzius, 1783)
- Rheumaptera hastata (Linnaeus, 1758)
- Rheumaptera subhastata (Nolcken, 1870)
- Rhodometra sacraria (Linnaeus, 1767)
- Rhodostrophia vibicaria (Clerck, 1759)
- Schistostege decussata (Denis & Schiffermüller, 1775)
- Schistostege nubilaria (Hübner, 1799)
- Scopula beckeraria (Lederer, 1853)
- Scopula flaccidaria (Zeller, 1852)
- Scopula floslactata (Haworth, 1809)
- Scopula imitaria (Hübner, 1799)
- Scopula immistaria (Herrich-Schäffer, 1852)
- Scopula immutata (Linnaeus, 1758)
- Scopula incanata (Linnaeus, 1758)
- Scopula marginepunctata (Goeze, 1781)
- Scopula subpunctaria (Herrich-Schäffer, 1847)
- Scopula ternata Schrank, 1802
- Scopula caricaria (Reutti, 1853)
- Scopula corrivalaria (Kretschmar, 1862)
- Scopula decorata (Denis & Schiffermüller, 1775)
- Scopula immorata (Linnaeus, 1758)
- Scopula nemoraria (Hübner, 1799)
- Scopula nigropunctata (Hufnagel, 1767)
- Scopula ochraceata (Staudinger, 1901)
- Scopula orientalis (Alphéraky, 1876)
- Scopula ornata (Scopoli, 1763)
- Scopula rubiginata (Hufnagel, 1767)
- Scopula subtilata (Christoph, 1867)
- Scopula tessellaria (Boisduval, 1840)
- Scopula virgulata (Denis & Schiffermüller, 1775)
- Scotopteryx bipunctaria (Denis & Schiffermüller, 1775)
- Scotopteryx chenopodiata (Linnaeus, 1758)
- Scotopteryx coarctaria (Denis & Schiffermüller, 1775)
- Scotopteryx luridata (Hufnagel, 1767)
- Scotopteryx moeniata (Scopoli, 1763)
- Scotopteryx mucronata (Scopoli, 1763)
- Selenia dentaria (Fabricius, 1775)
- Selenia lunularia (Hübner, 1788)
- Selenia tetralunaria (Hufnagel, 1767)
- Selidosema plumaria (Denis & Schiffermüller, 1775)
- Siona lineata (Scopoli, 1763)
- Spargania luctuata (Denis & Schiffermüller, 1775)
- Stegania cararia (Hübner, 1790)
- Stegania dilectaria (Hübner, 1790)
- Synopsia sociaria (Hübner, 1799)
- Tephronia sepiaria (Hufnagel, 1767)
- Thalera fimbrialis (Scopoli, 1763)
- Thera britannica (Turner, 1925)
- Thera juniperata (Linnaeus, 1758)
- Thera obeliscata (Hübner, 1787)
- Thera variata (Denis & Schiffermüller, 1775)
- Thera vetustata (Denis & Schiffermüller, 1775)
- Therapis flavicaria (Denis & Schiffermüller, 1775)
- Thetidia smaragdaria (Fabricius, 1787)
- Timandra comae Schmidt, 1931
- Trichopteryx carpinata (Borkhausen, 1794)
- Trichopteryx polycommata (Denis & Schiffermüller, 1775)
- Triphosa dubitata (Linnaeus, 1758)
- Triphosa sabaudiata (Duponchel, 1830)
- Venusia blomeri (Curtis, 1832)
- Venusia cambrica Curtis, 1839
- Xanthorhoe biriviata (Borkhausen, 1794)
- Xanthorhoe decoloraria (Esper, 1806)
- Xanthorhoe designata (Hufnagel, 1767)
- Xanthorhoe ferrugata (Clerck, 1759)
- Xanthorhoe fluctuata (Linnaeus, 1758)
- Xanthorhoe montanata (Denis & Schiffermüller, 1775)
- Xanthorhoe quadrifasiata (Clerck, 1759)
- Xanthorhoe spadicearia (Denis & Schiffermüller, 1775)

=== Glyphipterigidae ===
- Acrolepia autumnitella Curtis, 1838
- Acrolepiopsis assectella (Zeller, 1839)
- Acrolepiopsis tauricella (Staudinger, 1870)
- Digitivalva reticulella (Hübner, 1796)
- Digitivalva christophi (Toll, 1958)
- Digitivalva orientella (Klimesch, 1956)
- Digitivalva pulicariae (Klimesch, 1956)

=== Gracillariidae ===
- Acrocercops brongniardella (Fabricius, 1798)
- Aspilapteryx tringipennella (Zeller, 1839)
- Callisto coffeella (Zetterstedt, 1839)
- Callisto denticulella (Thunberg, 1794)
- Callisto insperatella (Nickerl, 1864)
- Caloptilia alchimiella (Scopoli, 1763)
- Caloptilia cuculipennella (Hübner, 1796)
- Caloptilia elongella (Linnaeus, 1761)
- Caloptilia falconipennella (Hübner, 1813)
- Caloptilia fidella (Reutti, 1853)
- Caloptilia fribergensis (Fritzsche, 1871)
- Caloptilia hemidactylella (Denis & Schiffermüller, 1775)
- Caloptilia populetorum (Zeller, 1839)
- Caloptilia roscipennella (Hübner, 1796)
- Caloptilia stigmatella (Fabricius, 1781)
- Caloptilia suberinella (Tengstrom, 1848)
- Calybites phasianipennella (Hübner, 1813)
- Cameraria ohridella Deschka & Dimic, 1986
- Dialectica imperialella (Zeller, 1847)
- Euspilapteryx auroguttella Stephens, 1835
- Gracillaria loriolella Frey, 1881
- Gracillaria syringella (Fabricius, 1794)
- Micrurapteryx kollariella (Zeller, 1839)
- Parectopa ononidis (Zeller, 1839)
- Parectopa robiniella Clemens, 1863
- Parornix anglicella (Stainton, 1850)
- Parornix anguliferella (Zeller, 1847)
- Parornix betulae (Stainton, 1854)
- Parornix carpinella (Frey, 1863)
- Parornix devoniella (Stainton, 1850)
- Parornix fagivora (Frey, 1861)
- Parornix finitimella (Zeller, 1850)
- Parornix petiolella (Frey, 1863)
- Parornix scoticella (Stainton, 1850)
- Parornix torquillella (Zeller, 1850)
- Phyllocnistis saligna (Zeller, 1839)
- Phyllocnistis unipunctella (Stephens, 1834)
- Phyllonorycter acerifoliella (Zeller, 1839)
- Phyllonorycter agilella (Zeller, 1846)
- Phyllonorycter alpina (Frey, 1856)
- Phyllonorycter anderidae (W. Fletcher, 1885)
- Phyllonorycter apparella (Herrich-Schäffer, 1855)
- Phyllonorycter blancardella (Fabricius, 1781)
- Phyllonorycter cavella (Zeller, 1846)
- Phyllonorycter cerasicolella (Herrich-Schäffer, 1855)
- Phyllonorycter cerasinella (Reutti, 1852)
- Phyllonorycter comparella (Duponchel, 1843)
- Phyllonorycter connexella (Zeller, 1846)
- Phyllonorycter coryli (Nicelli, 1851)
- Phyllonorycter corylifoliella (Hübner, 1796)
- Phyllonorycter crimea Baryshnikova & Budashkin, 2005
- Phyllonorycter distentella (Zeller, 1846)
- Phyllonorycter dubitella (Herrich-Schäffer, 1855)
- Phyllonorycter emberizaepenella (Bouche, 1834)
- Phyllonorycter esperella (Goeze, 1783)
- Phyllonorycter fraxinella (Zeller, 1846)
- Phyllonorycter froelichiella (Zeller, 1839)
- Phyllonorycter geniculella (Ragonot, 1874)
- Phyllonorycter gerasimowi (M. Hering, 1930)
- Phyllonorycter harrisella (Linnaeus, 1761)
- Phyllonorycter heegeriella (Zeller, 1846)
- Phyllonorycter hilarella (Zetterstedt, 1839)
- Phyllonorycter insignitella (Zeller, 1846)
- Phyllonorycter issikii (Kumata, 1963)
- Phyllonorycter joannisi (Le Marchand, 1936)
- Phyllonorycter junoniella (Zeller, 1846)
- Phyllonorycter klemannella (Fabricius, 1781)
- Phyllonorycter kuhlweiniella (Zeller, 1839)
- Phyllonorycter lantanella (Schrank, 1802)
- Phyllonorycter lautella (Zeller, 1846)
- Phyllonorycter medicaginella (Gerasimov, 1930)
- Phyllonorycter mespilella (Hübner, 1805)
- Phyllonorycter messaniella (Zeller, 1846)
- Phyllonorycter muelleriella (Zeller, 1839)
- Phyllonorycter nicellii (Stainton, 1851)
- Phyllonorycter nigrescentella (Logan, 1851)
- Phyllonorycter oxyacanthae (Frey, 1856)
- Phyllonorycter pastorella (Zeller, 1846)
- Phyllonorycter platani (Staudinger, 1870)
- Phyllonorycter populifoliella (Treitschke, 1833)
- Phyllonorycter pyrifoliella (Gerasimov, 1933)
- Phyllonorycter quercifoliella (Zeller, 1839)
- Phyllonorycter quinqueguttella (Stainton, 1851)
- Phyllonorycter rajella (Linnaeus, 1758)
- Phyllonorycter robiniella (Clemens, 1859)
- Phyllonorycter roboris (Zeller, 1839)
- Phyllonorycter sagitella (Bjerkander, 1790)
- Phyllonorycter salicicolella (Sircom, 1848)
- Phyllonorycter salictella (Zeller, 1846)
- Phyllonorycter scabiosella (Douglas, 1853)
- Phyllonorycter schreberella (Fabricius, 1781)
- Phyllonorycter scitulella (Duponchel, 1843)
- Phyllonorycter scopariella (Zeller, 1846)
- Phyllonorycter sorbi (Frey, 1855)
- Phyllonorycter spinicolella (Zeller, 1846)
- Phyllonorycter strigulatella (Lienig & Zeller, 1846)
- Phyllonorycter tenerella (de Joannis, 1915)
- Phyllonorycter tristrigella (Haworth, 1828)
- Phyllonorycter ulmifoliella (Hübner, 1817)
- Phyllonorycter viminetorum (Stainton, 1854)
- Povolnya leucapennella (Stephens, 1835)
- Sauterina hofmanniella (Schleich, 1867)

=== Heliozelidae ===
- Antispila metallella (Denis & Schiffermüller, 1775)
- Antispila treitschkiella (Fischer von Röslerstamm, 1843)
- Heliozela sericiella (Haworth, 1828)

=== Hepialidae ===
- Hepialus humuli (Linnaeus, 1758)
- Pharmacis fusconebulosa (DeGeer, 1778)
- Pharmacis lupulina (Linnaeus, 1758)
- Phymatopus hecta (Linnaeus, 1758)
- Triodia sylvina (Linnaeus, 1761)

=== Incurvariidae ===
- Incurvaria masculella (Denis & Schiffermüller, 1775)

=== Lasiocampidae ===
- Cosmotriche lobulina (Denis & Schiffermüller, 1775)
- Dendrolimus pini (Linnaeus, 1758)
- Eriogaster lanestris (Linnaeus, 1758)
- Euthrix potatoria (Linnaeus, 1758)
- Gastropacha quercifolia (Linnaeus, 1758)
- Gastropacha populifolia (Denis & Schiffermüller, 1775)
- Lasiocampa quercus (Linnaeus, 1758)
- Lasiocampa eversmanni (Eversmann, 1843)
- Lasiocampa trifolii (Denis & Schiffermüller, 1775)
- Macrothylacia rubi (Linnaeus, 1758)
- Malacosoma castrensis (Linnaeus, 1758)
- Malacosoma neustria (Linnaeus, 1758)
- Malacosoma franconica (Denis & Schiffermüller, 1775)
- Odonestis pruni (Linnaeus, 1758)
- Phyllodesma ilicifolia (Linnaeus, 1758)
- Phyllodesma tremulifolia (Hübner, 1810)
- Poecilocampa populi (Linnaeus, 1758)
- Trichiura crataegi (Linnaeus, 1758)

=== Lecithoceridae ===
- Lecithocera nigrana (Duponchel, 1836)

=== Limacodidae ===
- Apoda limacodes (Hufnagel, 1766)
- Heterogenea asella (Denis & Schiffermüller, 1775)

=== Lyonetiidae ===
- Leucoptera malifoliella (O. Costa, 1836)
- Leucoptera sinuella (Reutti, 1853)
- Lyonetia clerkella (Linnaeus, 1758)
- Lyonetia ledi Wocke, 1859
- Lyonetia prunifoliella (Hübner, 1796)
- Lyonetia pulverulentella Zeller, 1839

=== Lypusidae ===
- Amphisbatis incongruella (Stainton, 1849)
- Pseudatemelia flavifrontella (Denis & Schiffermüller, 1775)
- Pseudatemelia subochreella (Doubleday, 1859)
- Pseudatemelia josephinae (Toll, 1956)

=== Micropterigidae ===
- Micropterix aruncella (Scopoli, 1763)
- Micropterix aureatella (Scopoli, 1763)
- Micropterix aureoviridella (Hofner, 1898)
- Micropterix calthella (Linnaeus, 1761)
- Micropterix maschukella Alphéraky, 1876
- Micropterix myrtetella Zeller, 1850

=== Millieridae ===
- Millieria dolosalis (Heydenreich, 1851)

=== Momphidae ===
- Mompha langiella (Hübner, 1796)
- Mompha idaei (Zeller, 1839)
- Mompha miscella (Denis & Schiffermüller, 1775)
- Mompha confusella Koster & Sinev, 1996
- Mompha conturbatella (Hübner, 1819)
- Mompha epilobiella (Denis & Schiffermüller, 1775)
- Mompha lacteella (Stephens, 1834)
- Mompha ochraceella (Curtis, 1839)
- Mompha propinquella (Stainton, 1851)
- Mompha sturnipennella (Treitschke, 1833)
- Mompha subbistrigella (Haworth, 1828)
- Mompha locupletella (Denis & Schiffermüller, 1775)
- Mompha raschkiella (Zeller, 1839)

=== Nepticulidae ===
- Bohemannia pulverosella (Stainton, 1849)
- Ectoedemia agrimoniae (Frey, 1858)
- Ectoedemia albifasciella (Heinemann, 1871)
- Ectoedemia angulifasciella (Stainton, 1849)
- Ectoedemia arcuatella (Herrich-Schäffer, 1855)
- Ectoedemia argyropeza (Zeller, 1839)
- Ectoedemia atricollis (Stainton, 1857)
- Ectoedemia caradjai (Groschke, 1944)
- Ectoedemia heringi (Toll, 1934)
- Ectoedemia intimella (Zeller, 1848)
- Ectoedemia rubivora (Wocke, 1860)
- Ectoedemia similigena Puplesis, 1994
- Ectoedemia spinosella (de Joannis, 1908)
- Ectoedemia subbimaculella (Haworth, 1828)
- Ectoedemia turbidella (Zeller, 1848)
- Ectoedemia decentella (Herrich-Schäffer, 1855)
- Ectoedemia louisella (Sircom, 1849)
- Ectoedemia sericopeza (Zeller, 1839)
- Ectoedemia septembrella (Stainton, 1849)
- Ectoedemia amani Svensson, 1966
- Ectoedemia atrifrontella (Stainton, 1851)
- Ectoedemia longicaudella Klimesch, 1953
- Simplimorpha promissa (Staudinger, 1871)
- Stigmella aceris (Frey, 1857)
- Stigmella aeneofasciella (Herrich-Schäffer, 1855)
- Stigmella alnetella (Stainton, 1856)
- Stigmella anomalella (Goeze, 1783)
- Stigmella assimilella (Zeller, 1848)
- Stigmella atricapitella (Haworth, 1828)
- Stigmella aurella (Fabricius, 1775)
- Stigmella basiguttella (Heinemann, 1862)
- Stigmella betulicola (Stainton, 1856)
- Stigmella carpinella (Heinemann, 1862)
- Stigmella catharticella (Stainton, 1853)
- Stigmella centifoliella (Zeller, 1848)
- Stigmella continuella (Stainton, 1856)
- Stigmella desperatella (Frey, 1856)
- Stigmella dorsiguttella (Johansson, 1971)
- Stigmella floslactella (Haworth, 1828)
- Stigmella freyella (Heyden, 1858)
- Stigmella glutinosae (Stainton, 1858)
- Stigmella hemargyrella (Kollar, 1832)
- Stigmella hybnerella (Hübner, 1796)
- Stigmella incognitella (Herrich-Schäffer, 1855)
- Stigmella irregularis Puplesis, 1994
- Stigmella lemniscella (Zeller, 1839)
- Stigmella luteella (Stainton, 1857)
- Stigmella magdalenae (Klimesch, 1950)
- Stigmella malella (Stainton, 1854)
- Stigmella mespilicola (Frey, 1856)
- Stigmella microtheriella (Stainton, 1854)
- Stigmella minusculella (Herrich-Schäffer, 1855)
- Stigmella myrtillella (Stainton, 1857)
- Stigmella nylandriella (Tengstrom, 1848)
- Stigmella obliquella (Heinemann, 1862)
- Stigmella oxyacanthella (Stainton, 1854)
- Stigmella paliurella Gerasimov, 1937
- Stigmella paradoxa (Frey, 1858)
- Stigmella perpygmaeella (Doubleday, 1859)
- Stigmella plagicolella (Stainton, 1854)
- Stigmella poterii (Stainton, 1857)
- Stigmella prunetorum (Stainton, 1855)
- Stigmella pyri (Glitz, 1865)
- Stigmella regiella (Herrich-Schäffer, 1855)
- Stigmella rhamnella (Herrich-Schäffer, 1860)
- Stigmella roborella (Johansson, 1971)
- Stigmella rolandi van Nieukerken, 1990
- Stigmella ruficapitella (Haworth, 1828)
- Stigmella salicis (Stainton, 1854)
- Stigmella samiatella (Zeller, 1839)
- Stigmella sorbi (Stainton, 1861)
- Stigmella speciosa (Frey, 1858)
- Stigmella splendidissimella (Herrich-Schäffer, 1855)
- Stigmella thuringiaca (Petry, 1904)
- Stigmella tiliae (Frey, 1856)
- Stigmella tityrella (Stainton, 1854)
- Stigmella trimaculella (Haworth, 1828)
- Stigmella ulmivora (Fologne, 1860)
- Stigmella viscerella (Stainton, 1853)
- Trifurcula bleonella (Chrétien, 1904)
- Trifurcula headleyella (Stainton, 1854)
- Trifurcula melanoptera van Nieukerken & Puplesis, 1991
- Trifurcula eurema (Tutt, 1899)
- Trifurcula josefklimeschi van Nieukerken, 1990
- Trifurcula pallidella (Duponchel, 1843)
- Trifurcula subnitidella (Duponchel, 1843)

=== Noctuidae ===
- Abrostola asclepiadis (Denis & Schiffermüller, 1775)
- Abrostola tripartita (Hufnagel, 1766)
- Abrostola triplasia (Linnaeus, 1758)
- Acontia lucida (Hufnagel, 1766)
- Acontia candefacta (Hübner, 1831)
- Acontia trabealis (Scopoli, 1763)
- Acontia titania (Esper, 1798)
- Acontiola moldavicola (Herrich-Schäffer, 1851)
- Acosmetia caliginosa (Hübner, 1813)
- Acronicta aceris (Linnaeus, 1758)
- Acronicta leporina (Linnaeus, 1758)
- Acronicta strigosa (Denis & Schiffermüller, 1775)
- Acronicta alni (Linnaeus, 1767)
- Acronicta cuspis (Hübner, 1813)
- Acronicta psi (Linnaeus, 1758)
- Acronicta tridens (Denis & Schiffermüller, 1775)
- Acronicta auricoma (Denis & Schiffermüller, 1775)
- Acronicta cinerea (Hufnagel, 1766)
- Acronicta euphorbiae (Denis & Schiffermüller, 1775)
- Acronicta menyanthidis (Esper, 1789)
- Acronicta rumicis (Linnaeus, 1758)
- Actebia praecox (Linnaeus, 1758)
- Actebia fugax (Treitschke, 1825)
- Actinotia polyodon (Clerck, 1759)
- Aedia funesta (Esper, 1786)
- Aedophron rhodites (Eversmann, 1851)
- Aegle kaekeritziana (Hübner, 1799)
- Agrochola lychnidis (Denis & Schiffermüller, 1775)
- Agrochola helvola (Linnaeus, 1758)
- Agrochola humilis (Denis & Schiffermüller, 1775)
- Agrochola litura (Linnaeus, 1758)
- Agrochola nitida (Denis & Schiffermüller, 1775)
- Agrochola lota (Clerck, 1759)
- Agrochola macilenta (Hübner, 1809)
- Agrochola laevis (Hübner, 1803)
- Agrochola circellaris (Hufnagel, 1766)
- Agrotis bigramma (Esper, 1790)
- Agrotis characteristica Alphéraky, 1892
- Agrotis cinerea (Denis & Schiffermüller, 1775)
- Agrotis clavis (Hufnagel, 1766)
- Agrotis desertorum Boisduval, 1840
- Agrotis exclamationis (Linnaeus, 1758)
- Agrotis ipsilon (Hufnagel, 1766)
- Agrotis obesa Boisduval, 1829
- Agrotis puta (Hübner, 1803)
- Agrotis segetum (Denis & Schiffermüller, 1775)
- Agrotis trux (Hübner, 1824)
- Agrotis vestigialis (Hufnagel, 1766)
- Allophyes oxyacanthae (Linnaeus, 1758)
- Ammoconia caecimacula (Denis & Schiffermüller, 1775)
- Amphipoea fucosa (Freyer, 1830)
- Amphipoea oculea (Linnaeus, 1761)
- Amphipyra berbera Rungs, 1949
- Amphipyra livida (Denis & Schiffermüller, 1775)
- Amphipyra perflua (Fabricius, 1787)
- Amphipyra pyramidea (Linnaeus, 1758)
- Amphipyra tetra (Fabricius, 1787)
- Amphipyra tragopoginis (Clerck, 1759)
- Anaplectoides prasina (Denis & Schiffermüller, 1775)
- Anarta myrtilli (Linnaeus, 1761)
- Anarta dianthi (Tauscher, 1809)
- Anarta odontites (Boisduval, 1829)
- Anarta stigmosa (Christoph, 1887)
- Anarta trifolii (Hufnagel, 1766)
- Anorthoa munda (Denis & Schiffermüller, 1775)
- Antitype chi (Linnaeus, 1758)
- Apamea anceps (Denis & Schiffermüller, 1775)
- Apamea crenata (Hufnagel, 1766)
- Apamea epomidion (Haworth, 1809)
- Apamea furva (Denis & Schiffermüller, 1775)
- Apamea illyria Freyer, 1846
- Apamea lateritia (Hufnagel, 1766)
- Apamea lithoxylaea (Denis & Schiffermüller, 1775)
- Apamea monoglypha (Hufnagel, 1766)
- Apamea oblonga (Haworth, 1809)
- Apamea remissa (Hübner, 1809)
- Apamea rubrirena (Treitschke, 1825)
- Apamea scolopacina (Esper, 1788)
- Apamea sordens (Hufnagel, 1766)
- Apamea sublustris (Esper, 1788)
- Apamea unanimis (Hübner, 1813)
- Apaustis rupicola (Denis & Schiffermüller, 1775)
- Aporophyla lutulenta (Denis & Schiffermüller, 1775)
- Apterogenum ypsillon (Denis & Schiffermüller, 1775)
- Archanara dissoluta (Treitschke, 1825)
- Arenostola phragmitidis (Hübner, 1803)
- Asteroscopus sphinx (Hufnagel, 1766)
- Atethmia ambusta (Denis & Schiffermüller, 1775)
- Atethmia centrago (Haworth, 1809)
- Athetis furvula (Hübner, 1808)
- Athetis gluteosa (Treitschke, 1835)
- Athetis pallustris (Hübner, 1808)
- Atypha pulmonaris (Esper, 1790)
- Autographa bractea (Denis & Schiffermüller, 1775)
- Autographa buraetica (Staudinger, 1892)
- Autographa excelsa (Kretschmar, 1862)
- Autographa gamma (Linnaeus, 1758)
- Autographa jota (Linnaeus, 1758)
- Autographa macrogamma (Eversmann, 1842)
- Autographa mandarina (Freyer, 1845)
- Autographa pulchrina (Haworth, 1809)
- Axylia putris (Linnaeus, 1761)
- Brachionycha nubeculosa (Esper, 1785)
- Brachylomia viminalis (Fabricius, 1776)
- Bryophila felina (Eversmann, 1852)
- Bryophila orthogramma (Boursin, 1954)
- Bryophila raptricula (Denis & Schiffermüller, 1775)
- Bryophila ravula (Hübner, 1813)
- Bryophila seladona Christoph, 1885
- Bryophila domestica (Hufnagel, 1766)
- Calamia tridens (Hufnagel, 1766)
- Callopistria juventina (Stoll, 1782)
- Calophasia lunula (Hufnagel, 1766)
- Calophasia opalina (Esper, 1793)
- Calophasia platyptera (Esper, 1788)
- Caradrina morpheus (Hufnagel, 1766)
- Caradrina clavipalpis Scopoli, 1763
- Caradrina selini Boisduval, 1840
- Caradrina kadenii Freyer, 1836
- Caradrina montana Bremer, 1861
- Caradrina terrea Freyer, 1840
- Cardepia helix Boursin, 1962
- Cardepia irrisoria (Erschoff, 1874)
- Ceramica pisi (Linnaeus, 1758)
- Cerapteryx graminis (Linnaeus, 1758)
- Cerastis leucographa (Denis & Schiffermüller, 1775)
- Cerastis rubricosa (Denis & Schiffermüller, 1775)
- Cervyna cervago Eversmann, 1844
- Charanyca trigrammica (Hufnagel, 1766)
- Charanyca ferruginea (Esper, 1785)
- Chersotis alpestris (Boisduval, 1837)
- Chersotis cuprea (Denis & Schiffermüller, 1775)
- Chersotis deplanata (Eversmann, 1843)
- Chersotis fimbriola (Esper, 1803)
- Chersotis margaritacea (Villers, 1789)
- Chersotis rectangula (Denis & Schiffermüller, 1775)
- Chilodes distracta (Eversmann, 1848)
- Chilodes maritima (Tauscher, 1806)
- Chloantha hyperici (Denis & Schiffermüller, 1775)
- Chrysodeixis chalcites (Esper, 1789)
- Colocasia coryli (Linnaeus, 1758)
- Conisania cervina (Eversmann, 1842)
- Conisania leineri (Freyer, 1836)
- Conisania literata (Fischer von Waldheim, 1840)
- Conisania luteago (Denis & Schiffermüller, 1775)
- Conistra ligula (Esper, 1791)
- Conistra rubiginosa (Scopoli, 1763)
- Conistra vaccinii (Linnaeus, 1761)
- Conistra veronicae (Hübner, 1813)
- Conistra erythrocephala (Denis & Schiffermüller, 1775)
- Conistra rubiginea (Denis & Schiffermüller, 1775)
- Coranarta cordigera (Thunberg, 1788)
- Cornutiplusia circumflexa (Linnaeus, 1767)
- Cosmia trapezina (Linnaeus, 1758)
- Cosmia diffinis (Linnaeus, 1767)
- Cosmia pyralina (Denis & Schiffermüller, 1775)
- Cosmia affinis (Linnaeus, 1767)
- Craniophora ligustri (Denis & Schiffermüller, 1775)
- Craniophora pontica (Staudinger, 1878)
- Cryphia fraudatricula (Hübner, 1803)
- Cryphia receptricula (Hübner, 1803)
- Cryphia algae (Fabricius, 1775)
- Crypsedra gemmea (Treitschke, 1825)
- Cucullia absinthii (Linnaeus, 1761)
- Cucullia argentea (Hufnagel, 1766)
- Cucullia argentina (Fabricius, 1787)
- Cucullia artemisiae (Hufnagel, 1766)
- Cucullia asteris (Denis & Schiffermüller, 1775)
- Cucullia balsamitae Boisduval, 1840
- Cucullia biornata Fischer von Waldheim, 1840
- Cucullia chamomillae (Denis & Schiffermüller, 1775)
- Cucullia cineracea Freyer, 1841
- Cucullia dracunculi (Hübner, 1813)
- Cucullia fraudatrix Eversmann, 1837
- Cucullia gnaphalii (Hübner, 1813)
- Cucullia lactea (Fabricius, 1787)
- Cucullia lactucae (Denis & Schiffermüller, 1775)
- Cucullia lucifuga (Denis & Schiffermüller, 1775)
- Cucullia naruenensis Staudinger, 1879
- Cucullia pustulata Eversmann, 1842
- Cucullia santonici (Hübner, 1813)
- Cucullia scopariae Dorfmeister, 1853
- Cucullia tanaceti (Denis & Schiffermüller, 1775)
- Cucullia umbratica (Linnaeus, 1758)
- Cucullia xeranthemi Boisduval, 1840
- Cucullia blattariae (Esper, 1790)
- Cucullia lanceolata (Villers, 1789)
- Cucullia lychnitis Rambur, 1833
- Cucullia prenanthis Boisduval, 1840
- Cucullia scrophulariae (Denis & Schiffermüller, 1775)
- Cucullia verbasci (Linnaeus, 1758)
- Deltote bankiana (Fabricius, 1775)
- Deltote deceptoria (Scopoli, 1763)
- Deltote uncula (Clerck, 1759)
- Deltote pygarga (Hufnagel, 1766)
- Denticucullus pygmina (Haworth, 1809)
- Diachrysia chrysitis (Linnaeus, 1758)
- Diachrysia chryson (Esper, 1789)
- Diachrysia nadeja (Oberthur, 1880)
- Diachrysia stenochrysis (Warren, 1913)
- Diachrysia zosimi (Hübner, 1822)
- Diarsia brunnea (Denis & Schiffermüller, 1775)
- Diarsia dahlii (Hübner, 1813)
- Diarsia mendica (Fabricius, 1775)
- Diarsia rubi (Vieweg, 1790)
- Dichagyris flammatra (Denis & Schiffermüller, 1775)
- Dichagyris musiva (Hübner, 1803)
- Dichagyris candelisequa (Denis & Schiffermüller, 1775)
- Dichagyris flavina (Herrich-Schäffer, 1852)
- Dichagyris forcipula (Denis & Schiffermüller, 1775)
- Dichagyris melanura (Kollar, 1846)
- Dichagyris nachadira (Brandt, 1941)
- Dichagyris nigrescens (Hofner, 1888)
- Dichagyris orientis (Alphéraky, 1882)
- Dichagyris signifera (Denis & Schiffermüller, 1775)
- Dichagyris vallesiaca (Boisduval, 1837)
- Dichonia convergens (Denis & Schiffermüller, 1775)
- Dicycla oo (Linnaeus, 1758)
- Diloba caeruleocephala (Linnaeus, 1758)
- Divaena haywardi (Tams, 1926)
- Dryobotodes carbonis Wagner, 1931
- Dryobotodes eremita (Fabricius, 1775)
- Dypterygia scabriuscula (Linnaeus, 1758)
- Egira conspicillaris (Linnaeus, 1758)
- Elaphria venustula (Hübner, 1790)
- Enargia paleacea (Esper, 1788)
- Enterpia laudeti (Boisduval, 1840)
- Eogena contaminei (Eversmann, 1847)
- Epilecta linogrisea (Denis & Schiffermüller, 1775)
- Episema amasina Hampson, 1906
- Episema glaucina (Esper, 1789)
- Episema korsakovi (Christoph, 1885)
- Episema lederi Christoph, 1885
- Episema tersa (Denis & Schiffermüller, 1775)
- Eremobia ochroleuca (Denis & Schiffermüller, 1775)
- Eremohadena immunda (Eversmann, 1842)
- Eucarta amethystina (Hübner, 1803)
- Eucarta virgo (Treitschke, 1835)
- Euchalcia biezankoi (Alberti, 1965)
- Euchalcia consona (Fabricius, 1787)
- Euchalcia modestoides Poole, 1989
- Euchalcia variabilis (Piller, 1783)
- Eugnorisma ignoratum Varga & L. Ronkay, 1994
- Eugnorisma miniago (Freyer, 1839)
- Eugnorisma depuncta (Linnaeus, 1761)
- Eugraphe sigma (Denis & Schiffermüller, 1775)
- Euplexia lucipara (Linnaeus, 1758)
- Eupsilia transversa (Hufnagel, 1766)
- Eurois occulta (Linnaeus, 1758)
- Euxoa aquilina (Denis & Schiffermüller, 1775)
- Euxoa basigramma (Staudinger, 1870)
- Euxoa birivia (Denis & Schiffermüller, 1775)
- Euxoa christophi (Staudinger, 1870)
- Euxoa conspicua (Hübner, 1824)
- Euxoa cos (Hübner, 1824)
- Euxoa cursoria (Hufnagel, 1766)
- Euxoa diaphora Boursin, 1928
- Euxoa distinguenda (Lederer, 1857)
- Euxoa hastifera (Donzel, 1847)
- Euxoa nigricans (Linnaeus, 1761)
- Euxoa nigrofusca (Esper, 1788)
- Euxoa obelisca (Denis & Schiffermüller, 1775)
- Euxoa ochrogaster (Guenee, 1852)
- Euxoa recussa (Hübner, 1817)
- Euxoa temera (Hübner, 1808)
- Euxoa tritici (Linnaeus, 1761)
- Euxoa vitta (Esper, 1789)
- Fabula zollikoferi (Freyer, 1836)
- Globia algae (Esper, 1789)
- Globia sparganii (Esper, 1790)
- Gortyna flavago (Denis & Schiffermüller, 1775)
- Graphiphora augur (Fabricius, 1775)
- Griposia aprilina (Linnaeus, 1758)
- Hada plebeja (Linnaeus, 1761)
- Hadena christophi (Moschler, 1862)
- Hadena irregularis (Hufnagel, 1766)
- Hadena perplexa (Denis & Schiffermüller, 1775)
- Hadena silenes (Hübner, 1822)
- Hadena syriaca (Osthelder, 1933)
- Hadena adriana (Schawerda, 1921)
- Hadena albimacula (Borkhausen, 1792)
- Hadena capsincola (Denis & Schiffermüller, 1775)
- Hadena compta (Denis & Schiffermüller, 1775)
- Hadena confusa (Hufnagel, 1766)
- Hadena drenowskii (Rebel, 1930)
- Hadena filograna (Esper, 1788)
- Hadena magnolii (Boisduval, 1829)
- Hadena persimilis Hacker, 1996
- Hadena scythia Klyuchko & Hacker, 1996
- Hadena tephroleuca (Boisduval, 1833)
- Hecatera bicolorata (Hufnagel, 1766)
- Hecatera cappa (Hübner, 1809)
- Hecatera dysodea (Denis & Schiffermüller, 1775)
- Helicoverpa armigera (Hübner, 1808)
- Heliothis adaucta Butler, 1878
- Heliothis incarnata Freyer, 1838
- Heliothis maritima Graslin, 1855
- Heliothis nubigera Herrich-Schäffer, 1851
- Heliothis ononis (Denis & Schiffermüller, 1775)
- Heliothis peltigera (Denis & Schiffermüller, 1775)
- Heliothis viriplaca (Hufnagel, 1766)
- Helotropha leucostigma (Hübner, 1808)
- Hoplodrina ambigua (Denis & Schiffermüller, 1775)
- Hoplodrina blanda (Denis & Schiffermüller, 1775)
- Hoplodrina octogenaria (Goeze, 1781)
- Hoplodrina respersa (Denis & Schiffermüller, 1775)
- Hoplodrina superstes (Ochsenheimer, 1816)
- Hydraecia micacea (Esper, 1789)
- Hydraecia osseola Staudinger, 1882
- Hydraecia petasitis Doubleday, 1847
- Hydraecia ultima Holst, 1965
- Hyppa rectilinea (Esper, 1788)
- Hyssia cavernosa (Eversmann, 1842)
- Ipimorpha contusa (Freyer, 1849)
- Ipimorpha retusa (Linnaeus, 1761)
- Ipimorpha subtusa (Denis & Schiffermüller, 1775)
- Janthinea friwaldskii (Duponchel, 1835)
- Jodia croceago (Denis & Schiffermüller, 1775)
- Lacanobia contigua (Denis & Schiffermüller, 1775)
- Lacanobia suasa (Denis & Schiffermüller, 1775)
- Lacanobia thalassina (Hufnagel, 1766)
- Lacanobia aliena (Hübner, 1809)
- Lacanobia blenna (Hübner, 1824)
- Lacanobia oleracea (Linnaeus, 1758)
- Lacanobia praedita (Hübner, 1813)
- Lacanobia splendens (Hübner, 1808)
- Lacanobia w-latinum (Hufnagel, 1766)
- Lamprotes c-aureum (Knoch, 1781)
- Lasionycta imbecilla (Fabricius, 1794)
- Lasionycta proxima (Hübner, 1809)
- Lateroligia ophiogramma (Esper, 1794)
- Lenisa geminipuncta (Haworth, 1809)
- Leucania loreyi (Duponchel, 1827)
- Leucania comma (Linnaeus, 1761)
- Leucania obsoleta (Hübner, 1803)
- Leucania punctosa (Treitschke, 1825)
- Leucania zeae (Duponchel, 1827)
- Lithophane consocia (Borkhausen, 1792)
- Lithophane furcifera (Hufnagel, 1766)
- Lithophane lamda (Fabricius, 1787)
- Lithophane ornitopus (Hufnagel, 1766)
- Lithophane socia (Hufnagel, 1766)
- Litoligia literosa (Haworth, 1809)
- Luperina taurica (Kljutschko, 1967)
- Luperina testacea (Denis & Schiffermüller, 1775)
- Lycophotia porphyrea (Denis & Schiffermüller, 1775)
- Macdunnoughia confusa (Stephens, 1850)
- Mamestra brassicae (Linnaeus, 1758)
- Melanchra persicariae (Linnaeus, 1761)
- Mesapamea secalella Remm, 1983
- Mesapamea secalis (Linnaeus, 1758)
- Mesogona acetosellae (Denis & Schiffermüller, 1775)
- Mesogona oxalina (Hübner, 1803)
- Mesoligia furuncula (Denis & Schiffermüller, 1775)
- Mniotype adusta (Esper, 1790)
- Mniotype satura (Denis & Schiffermüller, 1775)
- Moma alpium (Osbeck, 1778)
- Mormo maura (Linnaeus, 1758)
- Mycteroplus puniceago (Boisduval, 1840)
- Mythimna albipuncta (Denis & Schiffermüller, 1775)
- Mythimna congrua (Hübner, 1817)
- Mythimna ferrago (Fabricius, 1787)
- Mythimna l-album (Linnaeus, 1767)
- Mythimna conigera (Denis & Schiffermüller, 1775)
- Mythimna impura (Hübner, 1808)
- Mythimna pallens (Linnaeus, 1758)
- Mythimna pudorina (Denis & Schiffermüller, 1775)
- Mythimna straminea (Treitschke, 1825)
- Mythimna turca (Linnaeus, 1761)
- Mythimna vitellina (Hübner, 1808)
- Mythimna unipuncta (Haworth, 1809)
- Mythimna alopecuri (Boisduval, 1840)
- Mythimna sicula (Treitschke, 1835)
- Naenia typica (Linnaeus, 1758)
- Netrocerocora quadrangula (Eversmann, 1844)
- Noctua comes Hübner, 1813
- Noctua fimbriata (Schreber, 1759)
- Noctua interposita (Hübner, 1790)
- Noctua janthina Denis & Schiffermüller, 1775
- Noctua orbona (Hufnagel, 1766)
- Noctua pronuba (Linnaeus, 1758)
- Nonagria typhae (Thunberg, 1784)
- Nyctobrya muralis (Forster, 1771)
- Ochropleura plecta (Linnaeus, 1761)
- Oligia latruncula (Denis & Schiffermüller, 1775)
- Oligia strigilis (Linnaeus, 1758)
- Oligia versicolor (Borkhausen, 1792)
- Omphalophana antirrhinii (Hübner, 1803)
- Opigena polygona (Denis & Schiffermüller, 1775)
- Orbona fragariae Vieweg, 1790
- Oria musculosa (Hübner, 1808)
- Orthosia gracilis (Denis & Schiffermüller, 1775)
- Orthosia opima (Hübner, 1809)
- Orthosia cerasi (Fabricius, 1775)
- Orthosia cruda (Denis & Schiffermüller, 1775)
- Orthosia miniosa (Denis & Schiffermüller, 1775)
- Orthosia populeti (Fabricius, 1775)
- Orthosia sordescens Hreblay, 1993
- Orthosia incerta (Hufnagel, 1766)
- Orthosia gothica (Linnaeus, 1758)
- Oxicesta geographica (Fabricius, 1787)
- Pabulatrix pabulatricula (Brahm, 1791)
- Pachetra sagittigera (Hufnagel, 1766)
- Panchrysia aurea (Hübner, 1803)
- Panchrysia v-argenteum (Esper, 1798)
- Panemeria tenebrata (Scopoli, 1763)
- Panolis flammea (Denis & Schiffermüller, 1775)
- Panthea coenobita (Esper, 1785)
- Papestra biren (Goeze, 1781)
- Paradiarsia punicea (Hübner, 1803)
- Parastichtis suspecta (Hübner, 1817)
- Peridroma saucia (Hübner, 1808)
- Periphanes delphinii (Linnaeus, 1758)
- Phlogophora meticulosa (Linnaeus, 1758)
- Phlogophora scita (Hübner, 1790)
- Photedes captiuncula (Treitschke, 1825)
- Photedes fluxa (Hübner, 1809)
- Photedes minima (Haworth, 1809)
- Phyllophila obliterata (Rambur, 1833)
- Plusia festucae (Linnaeus, 1758)
- Plusia putnami (Grote, 1873)
- Plusidia cheiranthi (Tauscher, 1809)
- Polia bombycina (Hufnagel, 1766)
- Polia hepatica (Clerck, 1759)
- Polia nebulosa (Hufnagel, 1766)
- Polychrysia esmeralda (Oberthur, 1880)
- Polychrysia moneta (Fabricius, 1787)
- Polymixis trisignata (Menetries, 1847)
- Polymixis polymita (Linnaeus, 1761)
- Polyphaenis sericata (Esper, 1787)
- Protoschinia scutosa (Denis & Schiffermüller, 1775)
- Pseudeustrotia candidula (Denis & Schiffermüller, 1775)
- Pyrrhia umbra (Hufnagel, 1766)
- Rhizedra lutosa (Hübner, 1803)
- Rhyacia arenacea (Hampson, 1907)
- Rhyacia lucipeta (Denis & Schiffermüller, 1775)
- Rhyacia simulans (Hufnagel, 1766)
- Rileyiana fovea (Treitschke, 1825)
- Saragossa porosa (Eversmann, 1854)
- Saragossa siccanorum (Staudinger, 1870)
- Schinia cognata (Freyer, 1833)
- Scotochrosta pulla (Denis & Schiffermüller, 1775)
- Sedina buettneri (E. Hering, 1858)
- Senta flammea (Curtis, 1828)
- Sidemia spilogramma (Rambur, 1871)
- Sideridis rivularis (Fabricius, 1775)
- Sideridis implexa (Hübner, 1809)
- Sideridis dalmae (Simonyi, 2010)
- Sideridis reticulata (Goeze, 1781)
- Sideridis egena (Lederer, 1853)
- Sideridis lampra (Schawerda, 1913)
- Sideridis turbida (Esper, 1790)
- Simyra albovenosa (Goeze, 1781)
- Simyra dentinosa Freyer, 1838
- Simyra nervosa (Denis & Schiffermüller, 1775)
- Spaelotis ravida (Denis & Schiffermüller, 1775)
- Spodoptera cilium Guenee, 1852
- Spodoptera exigua (Hübner, 1808)
- Standfussiana lucernea (Linnaeus, 1758)
- Stemmaphora viola Staudinger, 1888
- Subacronicta megacephala (Denis & Schiffermüller, 1775)
- Syngrapha ain (Hochenwarth, 1785)
- Syngrapha devergens (Hübner, 1813)
- Syngrapha hochenwarthi (Hochenwarth, 1785)
- Syngrapha interrogationis (Linnaeus, 1758)
- Syngrapha microgamma (Hübner, 1823)
- Thalerastria diaphora (Staudinger, 1879)
- Thalpophila matura (Hufnagel, 1766)
- Tholera cespitis (Denis & Schiffermüller, 1775)
- Tholera decimalis (Poda, 1761)
- Tiliacea aurago (Denis & Schiffermüller, 1775)
- Tiliacea citrago (Linnaeus, 1758)
- Tiliacea sulphurago (Denis & Schiffermüller, 1775)
- Trachea atriplicis (Linnaeus, 1758)
- Trichoplusia ni (Hübner, 1803)
- Tyta luctuosa (Denis & Schiffermüller, 1775)
- Ulochlaena hirta (Hübner, 1813)
- Valeria oleagina (Denis & Schiffermüller, 1775)
- Victrix umovii (Eversmann, 1846)
- Xanthia gilvago (Denis & Schiffermüller, 1775)
- Xanthia icteritia (Hufnagel, 1766)
- Xanthia ocellaris (Borkhausen, 1792)
- Xanthia castanea Osthelder, 1933
- Xanthia togata (Esper, 1788)
- Xestia ashworthii (Doubleday, 1855)
- Xestia c-nigrum (Linnaeus, 1758)
- Xestia ditrapezium (Denis & Schiffermüller, 1775)
- Xestia triangulum (Hufnagel, 1766)
- Xestia alpicola (Zetterstedt, 1839)
- Xestia baja (Denis & Schiffermüller, 1775)
- Xestia cohaesa (Herrich-Schäffer, 1849)
- Xestia stigmatica (Hübner, 1813)
- Xestia trifida (Fischer v. Waldheim, 1820)
- Xestia xanthographa (Denis & Schiffermüller, 1775)
- Xylena solidaginis (Hübner, 1803)
- Xylena exsoleta (Linnaeus, 1758)
- Xylena vetusta (Hübner, 1813)

=== Nolidae ===
- Bena bicolorana (Fuessly, 1775)
- Earias clorana (Linnaeus, 1761)
- Earias vernana (Fabricius, 1787)
- Garella musculana (Erschoff, 1874)
- Meganola albula (Denis & Schiffermüller, 1775)
- Meganola strigula (Denis & Schiffermüller, 1775)
- Meganola togatulalis (Hübner, 1796)
- Nola aerugula (Hübner, 1793)
- Nola confusalis (Herrich-Schäffer, 1847)
- Nola cucullatella (Linnaeus, 1758)
- Nycteola asiatica (Krulikovsky, 1904)
- Nycteola eremostola Dufay, 1961
- Nycteola revayana (Scopoli, 1772)
- Pseudoips prasinana (Linnaeus, 1758)

=== Notodontidae ===
- Cerura erminea (Esper, 1783)
- Cerura intermedia (Teich, 1876)
- Cerura vinula (Linnaeus, 1758)
- Clostera anachoreta (Denis & Schiffermüller, 1775)
- Clostera anastomosis (Linnaeus, 1758)
- Clostera curtula (Linnaeus, 1758)
- Clostera pigra (Hufnagel, 1766)
- Drymonia dodonaea (Denis & Schiffermüller, 1775)
- Drymonia querna (Denis & Schiffermüller, 1775)
- Drymonia ruficornis (Hufnagel, 1766)
- Furcula aeruginosa (Christoph, 1873)
- Furcula bicuspis (Borkhausen, 1790)
- Furcula bifida (Brahm, 1787)
- Furcula furcula (Clerck, 1759)
- Gluphisia crenata (Esper, 1785)
- Harpyia milhauseri (Fabricius, 1775)
- Leucodonta bicoloria (Denis & Schiffermüller, 1775)
- Notodonta dromedarius (Linnaeus, 1767)
- Notodonta torva (Hübner, 1803)
- Notodonta tritophus (Denis & Schiffermüller, 1775)
- Notodonta ziczac (Linnaeus, 1758)
- Odontosia carmelita (Esper, 1799)
- Peridea anceps (Goeze, 1781)
- Phalera bucephala (Linnaeus, 1758)
- Pheosia gnoma (Fabricius, 1776)
- Pheosia tremula (Clerck, 1759)
- Pterostoma palpina (Clerck, 1759)
- Ptilodon capucina (Linnaeus, 1758)
- Ptilophora plumigera (Denis & Schiffermüller, 1775)
- Spatalia argentina (Denis & Schiffermüller, 1775)
- Stauropus fagi (Linnaeus, 1758)
- Thaumetopoea pityocampa (Denis & Schiffermüller, 1775)

=== Oecophoridae ===
- Alabonia staintoniella (Zeller, 1850)
- Batia lambdella (Donovan, 1793)
- Batia lunaris (Haworth, 1828)
- Bisigna procerella (Denis & Schiffermüller, 1775)
- Borkhausenia fuscescens (Haworth, 1828)
- Borkhausenia minutella (Linnaeus, 1758)
- Crassa tinctella (Hübner, 1796)
- Crassa unitella (Hübner, 1796)
- Dasycera oliviella (Fabricius, 1794)
- Decantha borkhausenii (Zeller, 1839)
- Denisia augustella (Hübner, 1796)
- Denisia similella (Hübner, 1796)
- Denisia stipella (Linnaeus, 1758)
- Deuterogonia pudorina (Wocke, 1857)
- Endrosis sarcitrella (Linnaeus, 1758)
- Epicallima formosella (Denis & Schiffermüller, 1775)
- Esperia sulphurella (Fabricius, 1775)
- Fabiola pokornyi (Nickerl, 1864)
- Harpella forficella (Scopoli, 1763)
- Hofmannophila pseudospretella (Stainton, 1849)
- Holoscolia huebneri Kocak, 1980
- Metalampra cinnamomea (Zeller, 1839)
- Minetia adamczewskii (Toll, 1956)
- Minetia crinitus (Fabricius, 1798)
- Oecophora bractella (Linnaeus, 1758)
- Pleurota marginella (Denis & Schiffermüller, 1775)
- Pleurota aristella (Linnaeus, 1767)
- Pleurota bicostella (Clerck, 1759)
- Pleurota cumaniella Rebel, 1907
- Pleurota proteella Staudinger, 1880
- Pleurota pungitiella Herrich-Schäffer, 1854
- Pleurota pyropella (Denis & Schiffermüller, 1775)
- Schiffermuelleria schaefferella (Linnaeus, 1758)

=== Opostegidae ===
- Pseudopostega auritella (Hübner, 1813)
- Pseudopostega crepusculella (Zeller, 1839)

=== Praydidae ===
- Atemelia torquatella (Lienig & Zeller, 1846)
- Prays ruficeps (Heinemann, 1854)

=== Prodoxidae ===
- Lampronia morosa Zeller, 1852

=== Psychidae ===
- Acanthopsyche ecksteini (Lederer, 1855)
- Apterona helicoidella (Vallot, 1827)
- Dahlica karatyshica Rutjan, 2000
- Epichnopterix crimaeana Kozhantshikov, 1956
- Mauropterix jailensis Rutjan &Weidlich, 2008
- Megalophanes brachycornis Kozhantshikov, 1956
- Megalophanes viciella (Denis & Schiffermüller, 1775)
- Phalacropterix graslinella (Boisduval, 1852)
- Psychidea alba Solanikov, 1988
- Ptilocephala plumifera (Ochsenheimer, 1810)
- Rebelia nocturnella (Alphéraky, 1876)
- Reisseronia staudingeri (Heylaerts, 1879)
- Reisseronia tschetverikovi Solyanikov, 1988
- Whittleia undulella (Fischer v. Röslerstamm, 1837)

=== Pterophoridae ===
- Agdistis adactyla (Hübner, 1819)
- Agdistis tamaricis (Zeller, 1847)
- Buszkoiana capnodactylus (Zeller, 1841)
- Capperia celeusi (Frey, 1886)
- Capperia maratonica Adamczewski, 1951
- Capperia taurica Zagulajev, 1986
- Cnaemidophorus rhododactyla (Denis & Schiffermüller, 1775)
- Crombrugghia distans (Zeller, 1847)
- Emmelina monodactyla (Linnaeus, 1758)
- Geina didactyla (Linnaeus, 1758)
- Gillmeria miantodactylus (Zeller, 1841)
- Hellinsia osteodactylus (Zeller, 1841)
- Merrifieldia baliodactylus (Zeller, 1841)
- Merrifieldia leucodactyla (Denis & Schiffermüller, 1775)
- Merrifieldia malacodactylus (Zeller, 1847)
- Oxyptilus parvidactyla (Haworth, 1811)
- Procapperia kuldschaensis (Rebel, 1914)
- Procapperia linariae (Chrétien, 1922)
- Pselnophorus heterodactyla (Muller, 1764)
- Pselnophorus poggei (Mann, 1862)
- Pterophorus ischnodactyla (Treitschke, 1835)
- Pterophorus pentadactyla (Linnaeus, 1758)
- Stenoptilia bipunctidactyla (Scopoli, 1763)
- Stenoptilia mannii (Zeller, 1852)
- Wheeleria obsoletus (Zeller, 1841)
- Wheeleria spilodactylus (Curtis, 1827)

=== Pyralidae ===
- Acrobasis consociella (Hübner, 1813)
- Acrobasis dulcella (Zeller, 1848)
- Acrobasis glaucella Staudinger, 1859
- Acrobasis legatea (Haworth, 1811)
- Acrobasis marmorea (Haworth, 1811)
- Acrobasis obtusella (Hübner, 1796)
- Acrobasis sodalella Zeller, 1848
- Acrobasis suavella (Zincken, 1818)
- Acrobasis tumidana (Denis & Schiffermüller, 1775)
- Aglossa caprealis (Hübner, 1809)
- Alophia combustella (Herrich-Schäffer, 1855)
- Ancylosis cinnamomella (Duponchel, 1836)
- Ancylosis maculifera Staudinger, 1870
- Ancylosis oblitella (Zeller, 1848)
- Aphomia foedella (Zeller, 1839)
- Aphomia sociella (Linnaeus, 1758)
- Aphomia zelleri de Joannis, 1932
- Apomyelois ceratoniae (Zeller, 1839)
- Asalebria florella (Mann, 1862)
- Asarta aethiopella (Duponchel, 1837)
- Assara terebrella (Zincken, 1818)
- Bradyrrhoa gilveolella (Treitschke, 1832)
- Cadra figulilella (Gregson, 1871)
- Cadra furcatella (Herrich-Schäffer, 1849)
- Catastia marginea (Denis & Schiffermüller, 1775)
- Corcyra cephalonica (Stainton, 1866)
- Cryptoblabes gnidiella (Milliere, 1867)
- Denticera divisella (Duponchel, 1842)
- Dioryctria simplicella Heinemann, 1863
- Eccopisa effractella Zeller, 1848
- Ematheudes punctella (Treitschke, 1833)
- Endotricha flammealis (Denis & Schiffermüller, 1775)
- Ephestia unicolorella Staudinger, 1881
- Ephestia welseriella (Zeller, 1848)
- Epischnia illotella Zeller, 1839
- Epischnia prodromella (Hübner, 1799)
- Etiella zinckenella (Treitschke, 1832)
- Eucarphia vinetella (Fabricius, 1787)
- Eurhodope rosella (Scopoli, 1763)
- Euzophera bigella (Zeller, 1848)
- Euzophera fuliginosella (Heinemann, 1865)
- Euzophera pinguis (Haworth, 1811)
- Glyptoteles leucacrinella Zeller, 1848
- Gymnancyla canella (Denis & Schiffermüller, 1775)
- Homoeosoma inustella Ragonot, 1884
- Homoeosoma nebulella (Denis & Schiffermüller, 1775)
- Homoeosoma nimbella (Duponchel, 1837)
- Hypochalcia decorella (Hübner, 1810)
- Hypochalcia dignella (Hübner, 1796)
- Hypochalcia propinquella (Guenee, 1845)
- Hyporatasa allotriella (Herrich-Schäffer, 1855)
- Hypotia massilialis (Duponchel, 1832)
- Hypsopygia costalis (Fabricius, 1775)
- Hypsopygia glaucinalis (Linnaeus, 1758)
- Hypsopygia rubidalis (Denis & Schiffermüller, 1775)
- Insalebria serraticornella (Zeller, 1839)
- Isauria dilucidella (Duponchel, 1836)
- Khorassania compositella (Treitschke, 1835)
- Lamoria anella (Denis & Schiffermüller, 1775)
- Lamoria ruficostella Ragonot, 1888
- Laodamia faecella (Zeller, 1839)
- Megasis rippertella (Zeller, 1839)
- Merulempista cingillella (Zeller, 1846)
- Myelois circumvoluta (Fourcroy, 1785)
- Nephopterix angustella (Hübner, 1796)
- Oxybia transversella (Duponchel, 1836)
- Pempelia albariella Zeller, 1839
- Pempelia alpigenella (Duponchel, 1836)
- Phycita roborella (Denis & Schiffermüller, 1775)
- Phycitodes binaevella (Hübner, 1813)
- Plodia interpunctella (Hübner, 1813)
- Pseudophycita deformella (Moschler, 1866)
- Psorosa dahliella (Treitschke, 1832)
- Psorosa nucleolella (Moschler, 1866)
- Pterothrixidia rufella (Duponchel, 1836)
- Pyralis kacheticalis (Christoph, 1893)
- Pyralis lienigialis (Zeller, 1843)
- Pyralis regalis Denis & Schiffermüller, 1775
- Sciota adelphella (Fischer v. Röslerstamm, 1836)
- Sciota fumella (Eversmann, 1844)
- Sciota hostilis (Stephens, 1834)
- Sciota marmorata (Alphéraky, 1877)
- Selagia spadicella (Hübner, 1796)
- Stemmatophora brunnealis (Treitschke, 1829)
- Synaphe antennalis (Fabricius, 1794)
- Synaphe bombycalis (Denis & Schiffermüller, 1775)
- Synaphe moldavica (Esper, 1794)
- Synaphe punctalis (Fabricius, 1775)
- Trachonitis cristella (Denis & Schiffermüller, 1775)
- Vitula biviella (Zeller, 1848)

=== Saturniidae ===
- Aglia tau (Linnaeus, 1758)
- Saturnia pavonia (Linnaeus, 1758)
- Saturnia pavoniella (Scopoli, 1763)

=== Scythrididae ===
- Parascythris muelleri (Mann, 1871)
- Scythris apicalis (Zeller, 1847)
- Scythris bifissella (O. Hofmann, 1889)
- Scythris buszkoi Baran, 2004
- Scythris cicadella (Zeller, 1839)
- Scythris cuspidella (Denis & Schiffermüller, 1775)
- Scythris disparella (Tengstrom, 1848)
- Scythris flabella (Mann, 1861)
- Scythris fuscoaenea (Haworth, 1828)
- Scythris fuscopterella Bengtsson, 1977
- Scythris inertella (Zeller, 1855)
- Scythris palustris (Zeller, 1855)
- Scythris podoliensis Rebel, 1938
- Scythris productella (Zeller, 1839)
- Scythris pudorinella (Moschler, 1866)
- Scythris setiella (Zeller, 1870)
- Scythris sinensis (Felder & Rogenhofer, 1875)

=== Sesiidae ===
- Bembecia ichneumoniformis (Denis & Schiffermüller, 1775)
- Bembecia megillaeformis (Hübner, 1813)
- Bembecia puella Z. Lastuvka, 1989
- Bembecia scopigera (Scopoli, 1763)
- Chamaesphecia annellata (Zeller, 1847)
- Chamaesphecia astatiformis (Herrich-Schäffer, 1846)
- Chamaesphecia bibioniformis (Esper, 1800)
- Chamaesphecia chalciformis (Esper, 1804)
- Chamaesphecia crassicornis Bartel, 1912
- Chamaesphecia doleriformis (Herrich-Schäffer, 1846)
- Chamaesphecia dumonti Le Cerf, 1922
- Chamaesphecia empiformis (Esper, 1783)
- Chamaesphecia euceraeformis (Ochsenheimer, 1816)
- Chamaesphecia leucopsiformis (Esper, 1800)
- Chamaesphecia masariformis (Ochsenheimer, 1808)
- Chamaesphecia nigrifrons (Le Cerf, 1911)
- Chamaesphecia oxybeliformis (Herrich-Schäffer, 1846)
- Chamaesphecia palustris Kautz, 1927
- Chamaesphecia schmidtiiformis (Freyer, 1836)
- Paranthrene insolitus Le Cerf, 1914
- Paranthrene tabaniformis (Rottemburg, 1775)
- Pennisetia hylaeiformis (Laspeyres, 1801)
- Pyropteron affinis (Staudinger, 1856)
- Pyropteron cirgisa (Bartel, 1912)
- Pyropteron leucomelaena (Zeller, 1847)
- Pyropteron minianiformis (Freyer, 1843)
- Pyropteron triannuliformis (Freyer, 1843)
- Sesia apiformis (Clerck, 1759)
- Sesia bembeciformis (Hübner, 1806)
- Sesia melanocephala Dalman, 1816
- Synanthedon andrenaeformis (Laspeyres, 1801)
- Synanthedon cephiformis (Ochsenheimer, 1808)
- Synanthedon conopiformis (Esper, 1782)
- Synanthedon culiciformis (Linnaeus, 1758)
- Synanthedon formicaeformis (Esper, 1783)
- Synanthedon myopaeformis (Borkhausen, 1789)
- Synanthedon scoliaeformis (Borkhausen, 1789)
- Synanthedon spheciformis (Denis & Schiffermüller, 1775)
- Synanthedon stomoxiformis (Hübner, 1790)
- Synanthedon tipuliformis (Clerck, 1759)
- Synanthedon uralensis (Bartel, 1906)
- Synanthedon vespiformis (Linnaeus, 1761)
- Tinthia brosiformis (Hübner, 1813)
- Tinthia myrmosaeformis (Herrich-Schäffer, 1846)

=== Sphingidae ===
- Acherontia atropos (Linnaeus, 1758)
- Agrius convolvuli (Linnaeus, 1758)
- Daphnis nerii (Linnaeus, 1758)
- Deilephila elpenor (Linnaeus, 1758)
- Deilephila porcellus (Linnaeus, 1758)
- Hemaris croatica (Esper, 1800)
- Hemaris fuciformis (Linnaeus, 1758)
- Hemaris tityus (Linnaeus, 1758)
- Hyles euphorbiae (Linnaeus, 1758)
- Hyles gallii (Rottemburg, 1775)
- Hyles hippophaes (Esper, 1789)
- Hyles livornica (Esper, 1780)
- Hyles nicaea (de Prunner, 1798)
- Hyles vespertilio (Esper, 1780)
- Laothoe amurensis (Staudinger, 1879)
- Laothoe populi (Linnaeus, 1758)
- Macroglossum stellatarum (Linnaeus, 1758)
- Marumba quercus (Denis & Schiffermüller, 1775)
- Mimas tiliae (Linnaeus, 1758)
- Proserpinus proserpina (Pallas, 1772)
- Smerinthus ocellata (Linnaeus, 1758)
- Sphingoneopsis gorgoniades (Hübner, 1819)
- Sphinx ligustri Linnaeus, 1758
- Sphinx pinastri Linnaeus, 1758

=== Stathmopodidae ===
- Stathmopoda pedella (Linnaeus, 1761)

=== Thyrididae ===
- Thyris fenestrella (Scopoli, 1763)

=== Tineidae ===
- Anomalotinea liguriella (Milliere, 1879)
- Archinemapogon yildizae Kocak, 1981
- Ateliotum hungaricellum Zeller, 1839
- Cephimallota angusticostella (Zeller, 1839)
- Cephimallota colonella (Erschoff, 1874)
- Cephimallota crassiflavella Bruand, 1851
- Cephimallota praetoriella (Christoph, 1872)
- Ceratuncus danubiella (Mann, 1866)
- Elatobia fuliginosella (Lienig & Zeller, 1846)
- Eudarcia glaseri (Petersen, 1967)
- Eudarcia holtzi (Rebel, 1902)
- Euplocamus anthracinalis (Scopoli, 1763)
- Haplotinea ditella (Pierce & Metcalfe, 1938)
- Haplotinea insectella (Fabricius, 1794)
- Infurcitinea albicomella (Stainton, 1851)
- Infurcitinea argentimaculella (Stainton, 1849)
- Infurcitinea karadaghica Zagulajev, 1979
- Infurcitinea roesslerella (Heyden, 1865)
- Infurcitinea rumelicella (Rebel, 1903)
- Monopis crocicapitella (Clemens, 1859)
- Monopis fenestratella (Heyden, 1863)
- Monopis imella (Hübner, 1813)
- Monopis laevigella (Denis & Schiffermüller, 1775)
- Monopis monachella (Hübner, 1796)
- Monopis obviella (Denis & Schiffermüller, 1775)
- Monopis spilotella (Tengstrom, 1848)
- Montescardia tessulatellus (Zeller, 1846)
- Morophaga choragella (Denis & Schiffermüller, 1775)
- Morophaga morella (Duponchel, 1838)
- Myrmecozela pontica Zagulajev, 1971
- Myrmecozela stepicola Zagulajev, 1972
- Myrmecozela taurella Zagulajev, 1971
- Nemapogon clematella (Fabricius, 1781)
- Nemapogon cloacella (Haworth, 1828)
- Nemapogon fungivorella (Benander, 1939)
- Nemapogon granella (Linnaeus, 1758)
- Nemapogon gravosaellus Petersen, 1957
- Nemapogon hungaricus Gozmany, 1960
- Nemapogon inconditella (Lucas, 1956)
- Nemapogon meridionella (Zagulajev, 1962)
- Nemapogon nigralbella (Zeller, 1839)
- Nemapogon orientalis Petersen, 1961
- Nemapogon picarella (Clerck, 1759)
- Nemapogon ruricolella (Stainton, 1849)
- Nemapogon variatella (Clemens, 1859)
- Nemaxera betulinella (Fabricius, 1787)
- Neurothaumasia ankerella (Mann, 1867)
- Niditinea fuscella (Linnaeus, 1758)
- Scardia boletella (Fabricius, 1794)
- Stenoptinea cyaneimarmorella (Milliere, 1854)
- Tenaga nigripunctella (Haworth, 1828)
- Tinea columbariella Wocke, 1877
- Tinea dubiella Stainton, 1859
- Tinea nonimella (Zagulajev, 1955)
- Tinea pellionella Linnaeus, 1758
- Tinea semifulvella Haworth, 1828
- Tinea translucens Meyrick, 1917
- Tinea trinotella Thunberg, 1794
- Triaxomasia caprimulgella (Stainton, 1851)
- Triaxomera fulvimitrella (Sodoffsky, 1830)
- Triaxomera parasitella (Hübner, 1796)
- Trichophaga bipartitella (Ragonot, 1892)
- Trichophaga tapetzella (Linnaeus, 1758)
- Wegneria panchalcella (Staudinger, 1871)

=== Tischeriidae ===
- Coptotriche angusticollella (Duponchel, 1843)
- Coptotriche gaunacella (Duponchel, 1843)
- Coptotriche heinemanni (Wocke, 1871)
- Tischeria decidua Wocke, 1876
- Tischeria dodonaea Stainton, 1858
- Tischeria ekebladella (Bjerkander, 1795)

=== Tortricidae ===
- Abrepagoge treitschkeana (Treitschke, 1835)
- Acleris bergmanniana (Linnaeus, 1758)
- Acleris boscanoides Razowski, 1959
- Acleris cristana (Denis & Schiffermüller, 1775)
- Acleris ferrugana (Denis & Schiffermüller, 1775)
- Acleris fimbriana (Thunberg, 1791)
- Acleris forsskaleana (Linnaeus, 1758)
- Acleris hastiana (Linnaeus, 1758)
- Acleris kochiella (Goeze, 1783)
- Acleris laterana (Fabricius, 1794)
- Acleris literana (Linnaeus, 1758)
- Acleris notana (Donovan, 1806)
- Acleris quercinana (Zeller, 1849)
- Acleris rhombana (Denis & Schiffermüller, 1775)
- Acleris roscidana (Hübner, 1799)
- Acleris scabrana (Denis & Schiffermüller, 1775)
- Acleris schalleriana (Linnaeus, 1761)
- Acleris variegana (Denis & Schiffermüller, 1775)
- Aethes beatricella (Walsingham, 1898)
- Aethes bilbaensis (Rossler, 1877)
- Aethes confinis Razowski, 1974
- Aethes decimana (Denis & Schiffermüller, 1775)
- Aethes flagellana (Duponchel, 1836)
- Aethes kasyi Razowski, 1962
- Aethes kindermanniana (Treitschke, 1830)
- Aethes margaritifera Falkovitsh, 1963
- Aethes margarotana (Duponchel, 1836)
- Aethes moribundana (Staudinger, 1859)
- Aethes rubigana (Treitschke, 1830)
- Aethes sanguinana (Treitschke, 1830)
- Aethes scalana (Zerny, 1927)
- Aethes williana (Brahm, 1791)
- Agapeta hamana (Linnaeus, 1758)
- Agapeta zoegana (Linnaeus, 1767)
- Aleimma loeflingiana (Linnaeus, 1758)
- Aphelia euxina (Djakonov, 1929)
- Aphelia ferugana (Hübner, 1793)
- Aphelia stigmatana (Eversmann, 1844)
- Apotomis inundana (Denis & Schiffermüller, 1775)
- Apotomis lineana (Denis & Schiffermüller, 1775)
- Apotomis sauciana (Frolich, 1828)
- Bactra lacteana Caradja, 1916
- Barbara herrichiana Obraztsov, 1960
- Celypha anatoliana (Caradja, 1916)
- Celypha ermolenkoi Kostyuk, 1980
- Celypha rosaceana Schlager, 1847
- Celypha woodiana (Barrett, 1882)
- Choristoneura murinana (Hübner, 1799)
- Cnephasia asseclana (Denis & Schiffermüller, 1775)
- Cnephasia chrysantheana (Duponchel, 1843)
- Cnephasia communana (Herrich-Schäffer, 1851)
- Cnephasia genitalana Pierce & Metcalfe, 1922
- Cnephasia hellenica Obraztsov, 1956
- Cnephasia orientana (Alphéraky, 1876)
- Cnephasia pasiuana (Hübner, 1799)
- Cnephasia stephensiana (Doubleday, 1849)
- Cnephasia incertana (Treitschke, 1835)
- Cochylidia heydeniana (Herrich-Schäffer, 1851)
- Cochylidia implicitana (Wocke, 1856)
- Cochylidia richteriana (Fischer v. Röslerstamm, 1837)
- Cochylimorpha alternana (Stephens, 1834)
- Cochylimorpha asiana (Kennel, 1899)
- Cochylimorpha blandana (Eversmann, 1844)
- Cochylimorpha clathrana (Staudinger, 1871)
- Cochylimorpha discolorana (Kennel, 1899)
- Cochylimorpha hilarana (Herrich-Schäffer, 1851)
- Cochylimorpha meridiana (Staudinger, 1859)
- Cochylimorpha perturbatana (Kennel, 1900)
- Cochylimorpha sparsana (Staudinger, 1879)
- Cochylimorpha woliniana (Schleich, 1868)
- Cochylis epilinana Duponchel, 1842
- Cochylis hybridella (Hübner, 1813)
- Cochylis pallidana Zeller, 1847
- Cochylis posterana Zeller, 1847
- Cochylis roseana (Haworth, 1811)
- Cryptocochylis conjunctana (Mann, 1864)
- Cydia amplana (Hübner, 1800)
- Cydia inquinatana (Hübner, 1800)
- Cydia medicaginis (Kuznetsov, 1962)
- Cydia oxytropidis (Martini, 1912)
- Cydia pyrivora (Danilevsky, 1947)
- Cydia semicinctana (Kennel, 1901)
- Cydia strobilella (Linnaeus, 1758)
- Cydia succedana (Denis & Schiffermüller, 1775)
- Diceratura ostrinana (Guenee, 1845)
- Diceratura rhodograpta Djakonov, 1929
- Dichrorampha acuminatana (Lienig & Zeller, 1846)
- Dichrorampha aeratana (Pierce & Metcalfe, 1915)
- Dichrorampha alpinana (Treitschke, 1830)
- Dichrorampha cinerascens (Danilevsky, 1948)
- Dichrorampha eximia (Danilevsky, 1948)
- Dichrorampha gruneriana (Herrich-Schäffer, 1851)
- Dichrorampha incognitana (Kremky & Maslowski, 1933)
- Dichrorampha montanana (Duponchel, 1843)
- Dichrorampha nigrobrunneana (Toll, 1942)
- Dichrorampha plumbana (Scopoli, 1763)
- Dichrorampha podoliensis (Toll, 1942)
- Dichrorampha proxima (Danilevsky, 1948)
- Dichrorampha sequana (Hübner, 1799)
- Dichrorampha simpliciana (Haworth, 1811)
- Dichrorampha vancouverana McDunnough, 1935
- Doloploca punctulana (Denis & Schiffermüller, 1775)
- Eana incanana (Stephens, 1852)
- Eana osseana (Scopoli, 1763)
- Eana canescana (Guenee, 1845)
- Endothenia gentianaeana (Hübner, 1799)
- Endothenia lapideana (Herrich-Schäffer, 1851)
- Endothenia marginana (Haworth, 1811)
- Endothenia pullana (Haworth, 1811)
- Endothenia sororiana (Herrich-Schäffer, 1850)
- Endothenia ustulana (Haworth, 1811)
- Epagoge grotiana (Fabricius, 1781)
- Epibactra immundana (Eversmann, 1844)
- Epiblema confusana (Herrich-Schäffer, 1856)
- Epiblema junctana (Herrich-Schäffer, 1856)
- Epiblema scutulana (Denis & Schiffermüller, 1775)
- Epinotia festivana (Hübner, 1799)
- Epinotia nanana (Treitschke, 1835)
- Eucosma albidulana (Herrich-Schäffer, 1851)
- Eucosma apocryphoides Budashkin, 2009
- Eucosma flavispecula Kuznetsov, 1964
- Eucosma halophilana Budashkin, 2009
- Eucosma krygeri (Rebel, 1937)
- Eucosma metzneriana (Treitschke, 1830)
- Eucosma ukrainica Budashkin, 2009
- Eudemis profundana (Denis & Schiffermüller, 1775)
- Eugnosta lathoniana (Hübner, 1800)
- Eugnosta magnificana (Rebel, 1914)
- Eugnosta medvedevi (Gerasimov, 1929)
- Eupoecilia angustana (Hübner, 1799)
- Exapate congelatella (Clerck, 1759)
- Falseuncaria degreyana (McLachlan, 1869)
- Falseuncaria ruficiliana (Haworth, 1811)
- Fulvoclysia nerminae Kocak, 1982
- Grapholita lobarzewskii (Nowicki, 1860)
- Grapholita caecana Schlager, 1847
- Grapholita delineana Walker, 1863
- Grapholita fissana (Frolich, 1828)
- Grapholita internana (Guenee, 1845)
- Grapholita nigrostriana Snellen, 1883
- Hysterophora maculosana (Haworth, 1811)
- Isotrias hybridana (Hübner, 1817)
- Lobesia crimea Falkovitsh, 1970
- Lobesia indusiana (Zeller, 1847)
- Lobesia occidentis Falkovitsh, 1970
- Lozotaeniodes formosana (Frolich, 1830)
- Neosphaleroptera nubilana (Hübner, 1799)
- Olindia schumacherana (Fabricius, 1787)
- Oporopsamma wertheimsteini (Rebel, 1913)
- Pammene albuginana (Guenee, 1845)
- Pammene christophana (Moschler, 1862)
- Pammene herrichiana (Heinemann, 1854)
- Pammene tauriana Kuznetsov, 1960
- Pandemis chondrillana (Herrich-Schäffer, 1860)
- Pelatea klugiana (Freyer, 1836)
- Pelochrista arabescana (Eversmann, 1844)
- Pelochrista caecimaculana (Hübner, 1799)
- Pelochrista decolorana (Freyer, 1842)
- Pelochrista labyrinthicana (Christoph, 1872)
- Pelochrista mollitana (Zeller, 1847)
- Phalonidia affinitana (Douglas, 1846)
- Phalonidia albipalpana (Zeller, 1847)
- Phalonidia contractana (Zeller, 1847)
- Phalonidia manniana (Fischer v. Röslerstamm, 1839)
- Phaneta pauperana (Duponchel, 1843)
- Phiaris metallicana (Hübner, 1799)
- Philedonides rhombicana (Herrich-Schäffer, 1851)
- Phtheochroa amasiana (Ragonot, 1894)
- Phtheochroa fulvicinctana (Constant, 1893)
- Phtheochroa inopiana (Haworth, 1811)
- Phtheochroa kenneli (Obraztsov, 1944)
- Phtheochroa pulvillana Herrich-Schäffer, 1851
- Phtheochroa sociana (Esartyia, 1988)
- Propiromorpha rhodophana (Herrich-Schäffer, 1851)
- Pseudeulia asinana (Hübner, 1799)
- Pseudococcyx mughiana (Zeller, 1868)
- Rhyacionia pinivorana (Lienig & Zeller, 1846)
- Selenodes karelica (Tengstrom, 1875)
- Sparganothis pilleriana (Denis & Schiffermüller, 1775)
- Thiodia couleruana (Duponchel, 1834)
- Thiodia irinae Budashkin, 1990
- Thiodia torridana (Lederer, 1859)
- Thiodia trochilana (Frolich, 1828)
- Tortrix viridana Linnaeus, 1758
- Xerocnephasia rigana (Sodoffsky, 1829)

=== Yponomeutidae ===
- Cedestis gysseleniella Zeller, 1839
- Cedestis subfasciella (Stephens, 1834)
- Euhyponomeuta stannella (Thunberg, 1788)
- Euhyponomeutoides ribesiella (de Joannis, 1900)
- Ocnerostoma friesei Svensson, 1966
- Paraswammerdamia conspersella (Tengstrom, 1848)
- Paraswammerdamia nebulella (Goeze, 1783)
- Paraswammerdamia ornichella Friese, 1960
- Pseudoswammerdamia combinella (Hübner, 1786)
- Swammerdamia caesiella (Hübner, 1796)
- Swammerdamia compunctella Herrich-Schäffer, 1855
- Swammerdamia pyrella (Villers, 1789)
- Yponomeuta cagnagella (Hübner, 1813)
- Yponomeuta irrorella (Hübner, 1796)
- Yponomeuta mahalebella Guenee, 1845
- Yponomeuta malinellus Zeller, 1838
- Yponomeuta padella (Linnaeus, 1758)
- Yponomeuta plumbella (Denis & Schiffermüller, 1775)
- Yponomeuta rorrella (Hübner, 1796)
- Yponomeuta sedella Treitschke, 1832

=== Ypsolophidae ===
- Ochsenheimeria taurella (Denis & Schiffermüller, 1775)
- Ochsenheimeria vacculella Fischer von Röslerstamm, 1842

=== Zygaenidae ===
- Adscita albanica (Naufock, 1926)
- Adscita geryon (Hübner, 1813)
- Adscita krymensis Efetov, 1994
- Adscita statices (Linnaeus, 1758)
- Jordanita chloros (Hübner, 1813)
- Jordanita globulariae (Hübner, 1793)
- Jordanita graeca (Jordan, 1907)
- Jordanita subsolana (Staudinger, 1862)
- Jordanita budensis (Ad. & Au. Speyer, 1858)
- Jordanita volgensis (Moschler, 1862)
- Jordanita notata (Zeller, 1847)
- Rhagades pruni (Denis & Schiffermüller, 1775)
- Theresimima ampellophaga (Bayle-Barelle, 1808)
- Zygaena carniolica (Scopoli, 1763)
- Zygaena sedi Fabricius, 1787
- Zygaena brizae (Esper, 1800)
- Zygaena centaureae Fischer de Waldheim, 1832
- Zygaena cynarae (Esper, 1789)
- Zygaena laeta (Hübner, 1790)
- Zygaena minos (Denis & Schiffermüller, 1775)
- Zygaena punctum Ochsenheimer, 1808
- Zygaena purpuralis (Brunnich, 1763)
- Zygaena angelicae Ochsenheimer, 1808
- Zygaena dorycnii Ochsenheimer, 1808
- Zygaena ephialtes (Linnaeus, 1767)
- Zygaena filipendulae (Linnaeus, 1758)
- Zygaena lonicerae (Scheven, 1777)
- Zygaena loti (Denis & Schiffermüller, 1775)
- Zygaena osterodensis Reiss, 1921
- Zygaena trifolii (Esper, 1783)
- Zygaena viciae (Denis & Schiffermüller, 1775)
