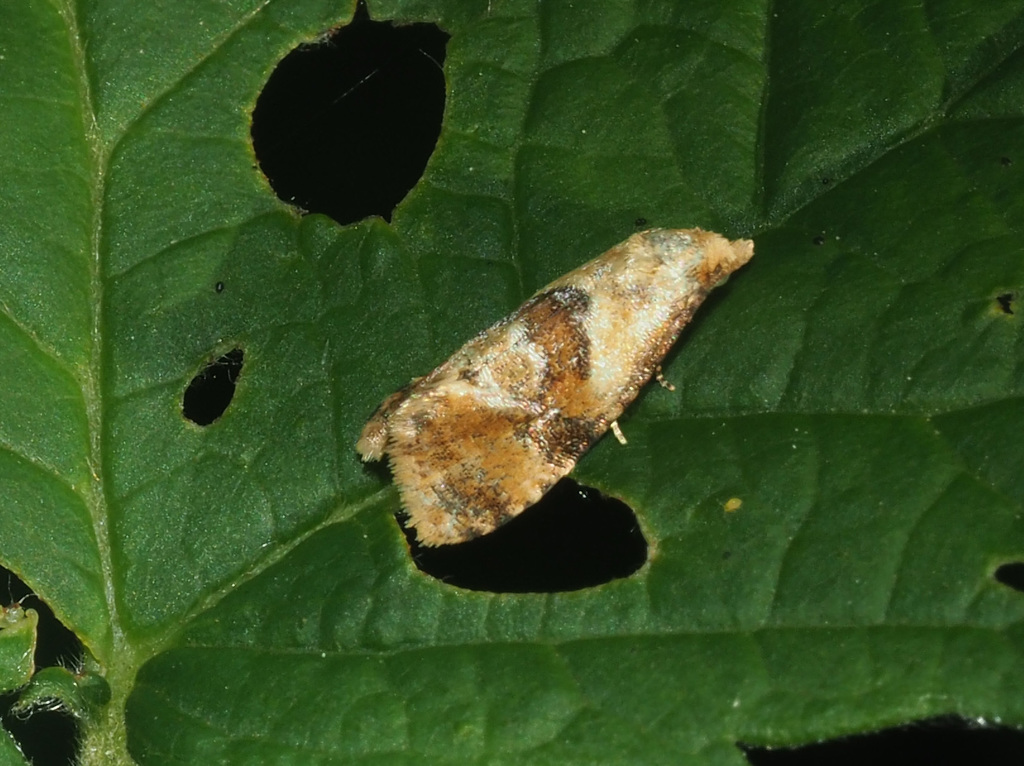

Scientific classification
- Kingdom: Animalia
- Phylum: Arthropoda
- Class: Insecta
- Order: Lepidoptera
- Family: Tortricidae
- Genus: Phalonidia
- Species: P. udana

Binomial name
- Phalonidia udana (Guenée, 1845)

Synonyms
- Cochylis udana Guenée, 1845; Phalonidia tolli Razowski, 1960 (Junior synonym)

= Phalonidia udana =

Loosestrife conch

Loosestrife conch – species of moth

Phalonidia udana, or the loosestrife conch, is a European species of moth of the family Tortricidae, the subfamily Tortricinae, and the tribe Cochylini. It is widely distributed in the North Palaearctic but appears to be largely rare or missing in Central Europe. Previously, it was classified under the Phalonidia manniana taxon, but a recent effort to barcode all North European Lepidoptera revealed that P. udana and P. mannania are two distinct species.

== Description ==
=== 2012 redescription ===
When P. udana was found to be a distinct species, it was redescribed in Mutanen et al., 2012:

==== Adult ====
Head: Cream-coloured. Antenna cream above, light brown underneath, ciliate, cilia slightly shorter than diameter of shaft, minutely ciliate in female. Labial palpus 2 times diameter of eye, cream, second segment externally slightly brownish.

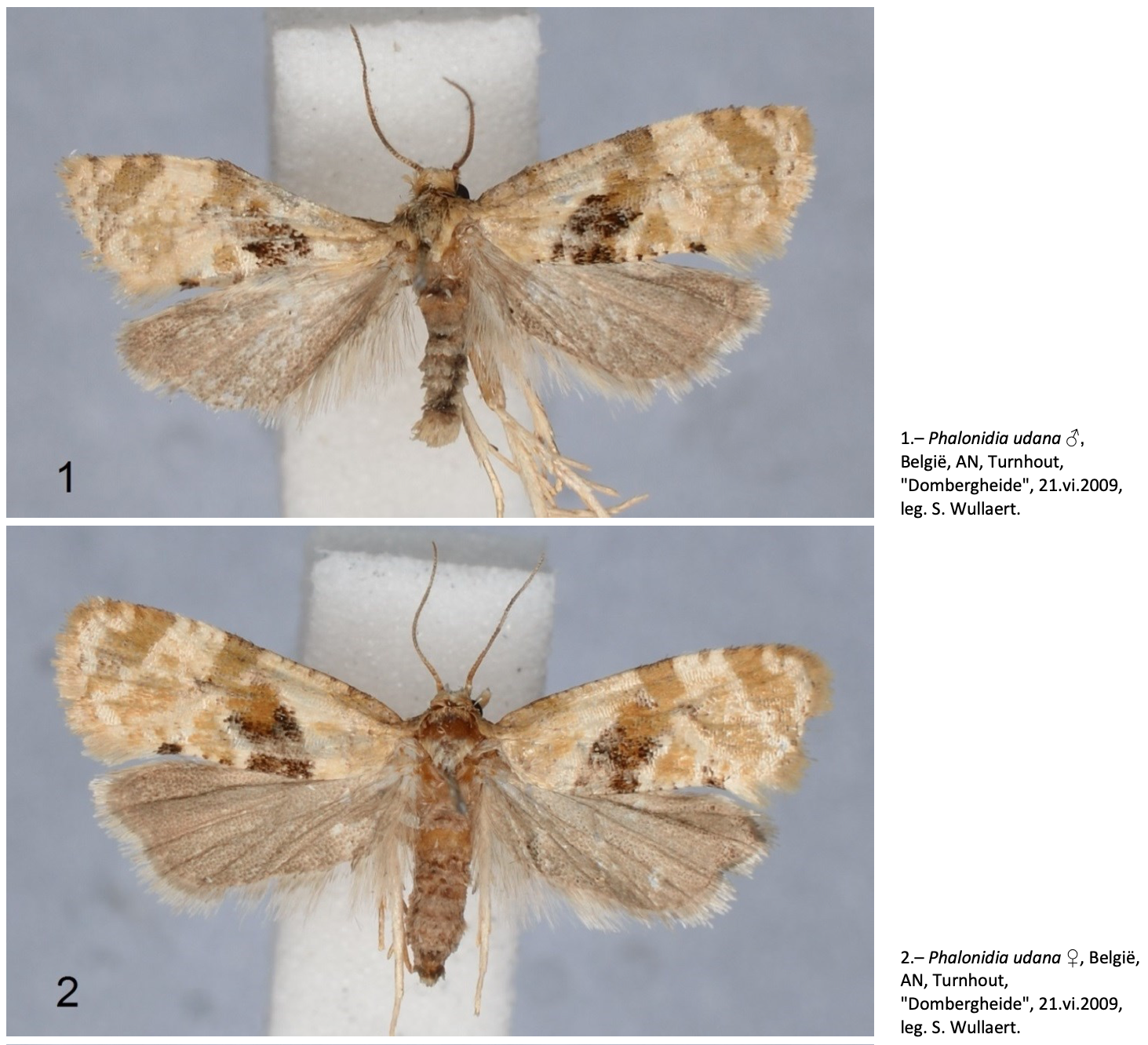
Male vs. female P. udana.

Thorax: Beige, tegulae suffused with grey. Legs cream, fore and mid legs externally flecked with grey. Wingspan 10.0–13.0 mm in male; 10.0–14.0 mm in female. Forewing ground colour cream; basal and sub-basal fasciae forming diffuse, greyish ochre basal patch; median fascia brownish ochreous, angled at one third from costa, dorsal half distinct, suffused with blackish; postmedian fascia ochreous, weak; pre-tornal spot dark blackish grey; subterminal fascia brownish ochreous, becoming narrower towards tornus; terminal line light grey; cilia light ochreous, becoming lighter towards tornus; underside fuscous, 1–3 cream-coloured strigulae on costa in apical two-fifths, basal third below cell cream, ochreous spot on cubital vein at one fifth from base. Hindwing grey, veins and sub-basal line darker; cilia light grey, becoming whitish towards anal area; underside cream, with sparse grey transverse striae, particularly in apical third.

Abdomen: Dorsally grey, ventrally cream, abdominal tuft light ochreous. Male genitalia with tegumen a wide arch; socii with broad base, weak, setose; median process of transtilla long and slender; valva slender, cucullus tapering in proximal half, parallel sided or slightly tapering in distal half, sacculus short, rounded, protruding; excavation between sacculus and cucullus deep, forming an angle of 90 degrees or slightly less; juxta heart-shaped; phallus of even width, curved at 2/3, with strongly sclerotised ventral plate; vesica with numerous denticles and one strong cornutus with large base. Female genitalia with papillae anales band-like; eighth segment short; sterigma with large cup-shaped anterior part; ductus bursae broad, entirely membranous; corpus bursae with large posterior sclerite and numerous spines, also in the posterior part; some of the spines forming a circle. The position of the sclerite and spines depends in part on how the bursae is compressed on the slide. In most preparations the sclerite is positioned on the right side, causing a membranous portion on the left side. The length of the ductus bursae is variable.

==== Larva ====
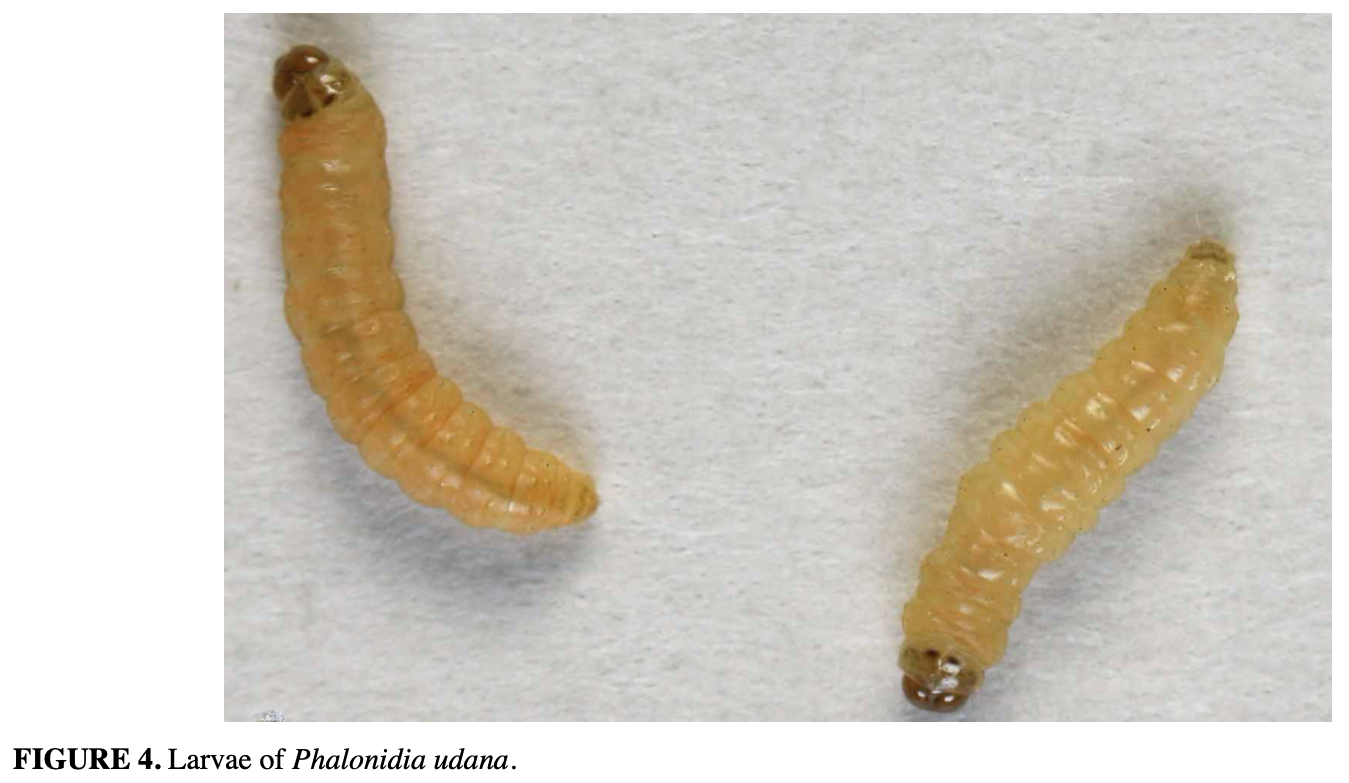
Larvae of P. udana.

Length 12 mm. Body orange brown, with lens-shaped sculpture. Head capsule, prothoracic shield and anal shield indistinctly sclerotized, brown.

Head: semiprogathous, partially retractible into thorax. Frons extended to cranial incision; adfrontal sclerites narrow. Submental pit absent. Mandible with five conspicuous, blunt teeth. Labial palpus dorsolaterad of spinneret; fusulus somewhat bent to ventral direction. Labrum with a notch in ventral margin, with 12 setae. Six stemmata present, forming mesal penellipse, of approximately same size. Stipular setae of spinneret rather long, thin. Fa close to each other, F1 near margin of frons at its widest point. C1 longer, C2 as long as F1. P1 close to adfrontalia, four times longer than P2 which is dorsolaterad of it; Pb halfway between them. A1 half the length of P1, A2 dorsolaterad of it, length half of that of A1.

Prothorax: Prothoracic shield with posteriomedian cleavage, weakly sclerotized except in small areas dorsoposteriorly. D1 minute, in line with D2 and SD1; L group trisetose, L2 dorsoanteriorly to L1, L3 in line with L1; length of all L setae equal; SV group bisetose; all setae in their own pinaculum. Meso- and metathorax: D1 and D2 approximate, in their own pinacula (when D1 present), their relative position varies between specimens and segment and shows asymmetry; SD group bisetose, SD1 twice the length of SD2; L group trisetose, L1 distinctly longer than L2 and L3; L setae in row, distance between D1 and D3 twice as long as that of D1 and D2. Thoracic legs: tarsal setae 1 and 4 longer than 2 and 3; axial seta of claw absent; claw without sculpture.

Abdomen: prolegs on A3–6 and A10, of equal size, crochets uniserial and uniordinal, in full circle in A3-6, in lateral row in A10. Anal comb present in A10, with four stout setae. A1-8: D1 tiny, anteromedial to D2; one SD seta discernible; L group bisetose, L1 short, dorsad of the much longer L2. SV trisetose, all setae in their own pinaculum. A9: Interpretation of setae uncertain due to variation and asymmetry. No secondary setae present.

=== Distinction from Phalonidia manniana ===
Phalonidia udana is closely related to P. manniana; distinction between the two species requires examination of the genitalia. They differ slightly in morphology, but these differences are difficult to define and are therefore unreliable; however, P. udana is slightly larger than P. manniana. Furthermore, the two species have different food sources: P. udana larvae feed on Lythrum and Lysimachia, or loosestrife, while P. manniana larvae feed on Mentha aquatica, or water mint, and Lycopus europaeus, or gypsywort.

The difference in genitalia is described in Wullaert et al., 2014:

The male genitals of Ph. udana can be distinguished from Ph. manniana due to the shape of the slender and longer transtilla and the angle between the sacculus and cucullus being less than 90 degrees. The female genitalia of Ph. udana differs from that of Ph. manniana due to the location of the sclerite in the bursa; in Ph. udana lies the sclerite in the posterior portion (upper right) of the bursa, in Ph. manniana, this sclerite is located in the anterior (bottom) part. Furthermore, [in] Ph. udana more thorns [are] present in the bursa compared to Ph. manniana.

For a key to the terms used, see Glossary of entomology terms.

== Occurrences ==
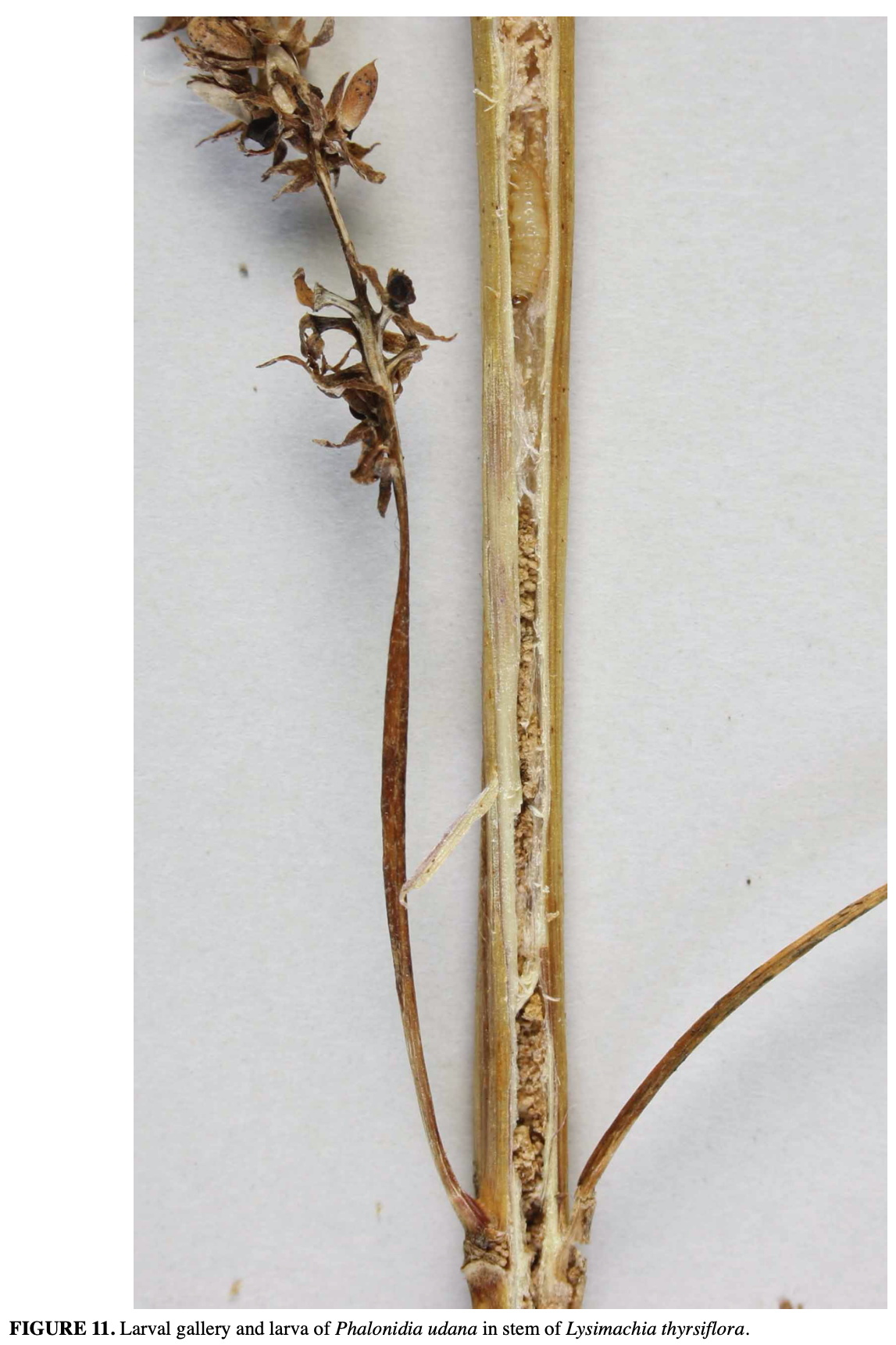
Larva of P. udana inside stem of L. thyrsiflora.

Adult P. udana have been recorded from May to August, most commonly occurring in June and July. Most of its occurrences have taken place since 1973, though the species was introduced in 1845. It can be observed on the plants Lysimachia vulgaris, or garden loosestrife, and Lysimachia thyrsiflora, or tufted loosestrife, where its larvae bore into the stem, hibernate, and Pupate.

Phalonidia udana have primarily been recorded in Denmark, Finland, the Netherlands, Norway, and Sweden. The species has also been observed, though less commonly, in Austria, Åland, Belgium, Estonia, Germany, and Hungary.

== Taxonomical history ==
Phalonidia udana was originally introduced as Cochylis udana by Guenée, 1845. C. udana was described from an unspecified number of specimens collected in moist meadows in mid-August. A lectotype was selected by Razowski, 1970, who concluded that the type-locality was Châteaudun (Eure et Loir, France).

Until 2012, P. udana was classified under the P. manniana taxon. In 2009, irregular Phalonidia specimens (resembling, but not identical to, P. manniana) were obtained in Finland, and DNA barcode sequence data and morphology were used to investigate. Researchers soon discovered the distinctness of P. udana, the details of which are referenced in Mutanen et al., 2012:

The different-looking specimen showed at minimum 3.8% Kimura 2 Parameter distance to the specimens of typical P. manniana, while variation among other specimens of P. manniana was below 0.16%. A careful examination of the adults revealed morphological differences as well. The phenotypically different specimens were collected in an area where Mentha aquatica and Lycopus are present; in the collecting sites of the rest of the Finnish specimens Mentha and Lycopus are absent but Lysimachia is abundant. It thus became likely that the two haplotype clusters represent biologically distinct species that differ in their DNA barcodes, adult morphology, and larval food plant.

For a key to the terms used, see Glossary of entomology terms.

== Similar species ==
- Acleris aurichalcana (Bremer, 1865)
- Acleris stibiana (Snellen, 1883)
- Adoxophyes orana (Fischer von Röslerstamm, 1834)
- Aethes languidana (J. J. Mann, 1855)
- Aethes moribundana (Staudinger, 1859)
- Aethes nefandana (Kennel, 1899)
- Aethes perfidana (Kennel, 1900)
- Aethes prangana (Kennel, 1900)
- Agapeta angelana (Kennel, 1919)
- Aphelia christophi (Obraztsov, 1955)
- Archips ingentanus (Christoph, 1881)
- Clavigesta sylvestrana (Curtis, 1850)
- Clepsis rolandriana (Linnaeus, 1758)
- Cochylidia richteriana (Fischer von Röslerstamm, 1837)
- Cochylimorpha elongana (Fischer von Röslerstamm, 1839)
- Cochylimorpha hilarana (Herrich-Schäffer, 1851)
- Cochylimorpha obliquana (Eversmann, 1844)
- Cochylimorpha perfusana (Guenée, 1845)
- Cochylimorpha peucedana (Ragonot, 1889)
- Cochylimorpha sparsana (Staudinger, 1880)
- Cochylis faustana (Kennel, 1919)
- Cochylis roseana (Haworth, 1811)
- Epinotia immundana (Fischer von Röslerstamm, 1839)
- Epinotia pusillana (Peyerimhoff, 1863)
- Eucosma messingiana (Fischer v. Röslerstamm, 1837)
- Gibberifera simplana (Fischer v. Röslerstamm, 1836)
- Gynnidomorpha alismana (Ragonot, 1883)
- Philedonides rhombicana (Herrich-Schäffer, 1851)
- Sparganothis praecana (Kennel, 1900)
- Tosirips perpulchrana (Kennel, 1901)
