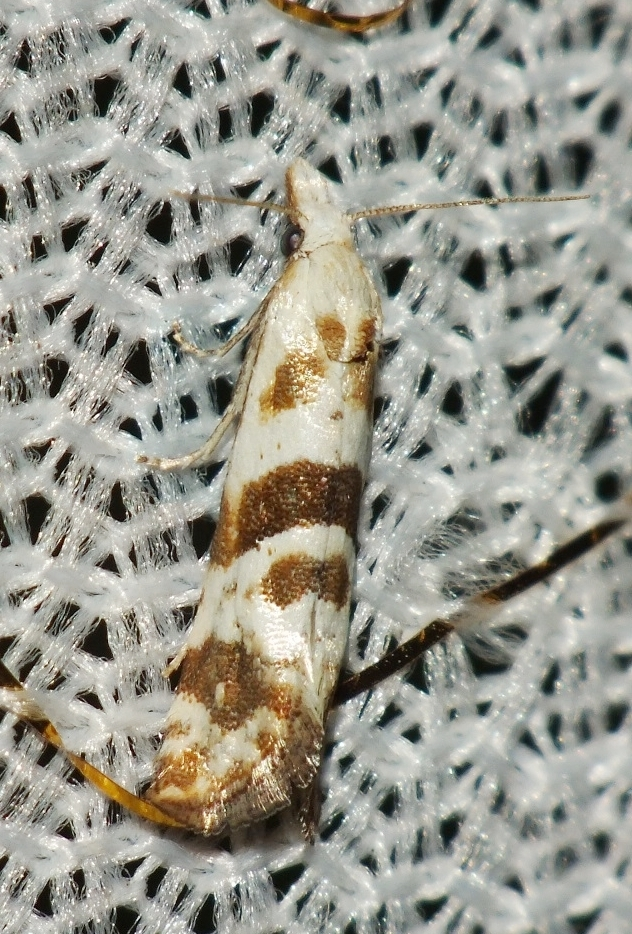

Scientific classification
- Kingdom: Animalia
- Phylum: Arthropoda
- Class: Insecta
- Order: Lepidoptera
- Family: Tortricidae
- Genus: Cochylimorpha
- Species: C. discolorana

Binomial name
- Cochylimorpha discolorana (Kennel, 1899)

Synonyms
- Cochylis discolorana Kennel, 1899; Cochylimorpha discolourana; Euxanthis dichroina Danilevsky, in Danilevsky, Kuznetzov & Falkovitsh, 1962; Stenodes sarobica Razowski, 1964

= Cochylimorpha discolorana =

Species of moth

Cochylimorpha discolorana is a species of moth in the family Tortricidae. It is found in Romania, Ukraine, Russia (south-eastern European Russia, Transalai, the Caucasus), Azerbaijan, Georgia, Kazakhstan, Central Asia, Afghanistan and Iran.

The wingspan is 17–19 mm. Adults have been recorded on wing from April to June.
