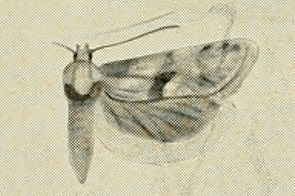

Scientific classification
- Domain: Eukaryota
- Kingdom: Animalia
- Phylum: Arthropoda
- Class: Insecta
- Order: Lepidoptera
- Family: Tortricidae
- Genus: Cochylimorpha
- Species: C. asiana

Binomial name
- Cochylimorpha asiana (Kennel, 1899)

Synonyms
- Cochylis asiana Kennel, 1899; Euxanthis mirabilana Turati, 1934; Euxanthis taganrogana Kennel, 1900

= Cochylimorpha asiana =

Species of moth

Cochylimorpha asiana is a species of moth of the family Tortricidae. It is found in China (Beijing, Gansu, Hebei, Heilongjiang, Ningxia, Qinghai, Shaanxi, Shandong), Afghanistan, Iran, Mongolia, Ukraine, Russia, Kyrgyzstan, Turkmenistan, Kazakhstan and Libya.

The wingspan is 17–21 mm. Adults have been recorded on wing from April to July.
