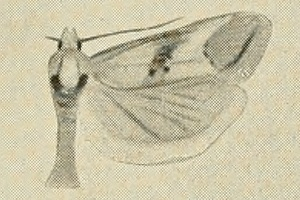

Scientific classification
- Domain: Eukaryota
- Kingdom: Animalia
- Phylum: Arthropoda
- Class: Insecta
- Order: Lepidoptera
- Family: Tortricidae
- Genus: Cochylimorpha
- Species: C. diana

Binomial name
- Cochylimorpha diana (Kennel, 1899)

Synonyms
- Cochylis diana Kennel, 1899; Euxanthoides iraniana Razowski, 1963

= Cochylimorpha diana =

Species of moth

Cochylimorpha diana is a species of moth of the family Tortricidae. It is found in Asia Minor, Syria, the Palestinian Territories, Armenia, Lebanon and Iran.

The wingspan is 16–25 mm.
