= Cochylimorpha emiliana =

Scientific classification
- Kingdom: Animalia
- Phylum: Arthropoda
- Clade: Pancrustacea
- Class: Insecta
- Order: Lepidoptera
- Family: Tortricidae
- Genus: Cochylimorpha
- Species: C. emiliana

Binomial name
- Cochylimorpha emiliana (Kennel, 1919)

Synonyms
- Euxanthis emiliana Kennel, 1919

Species of moth

Cochylimorpha emiliana is a species of moth of the family Tortricidae. It is found in China (Heilongjiang, Qinghai), Mongolia, Russia and Turkmenistan.
