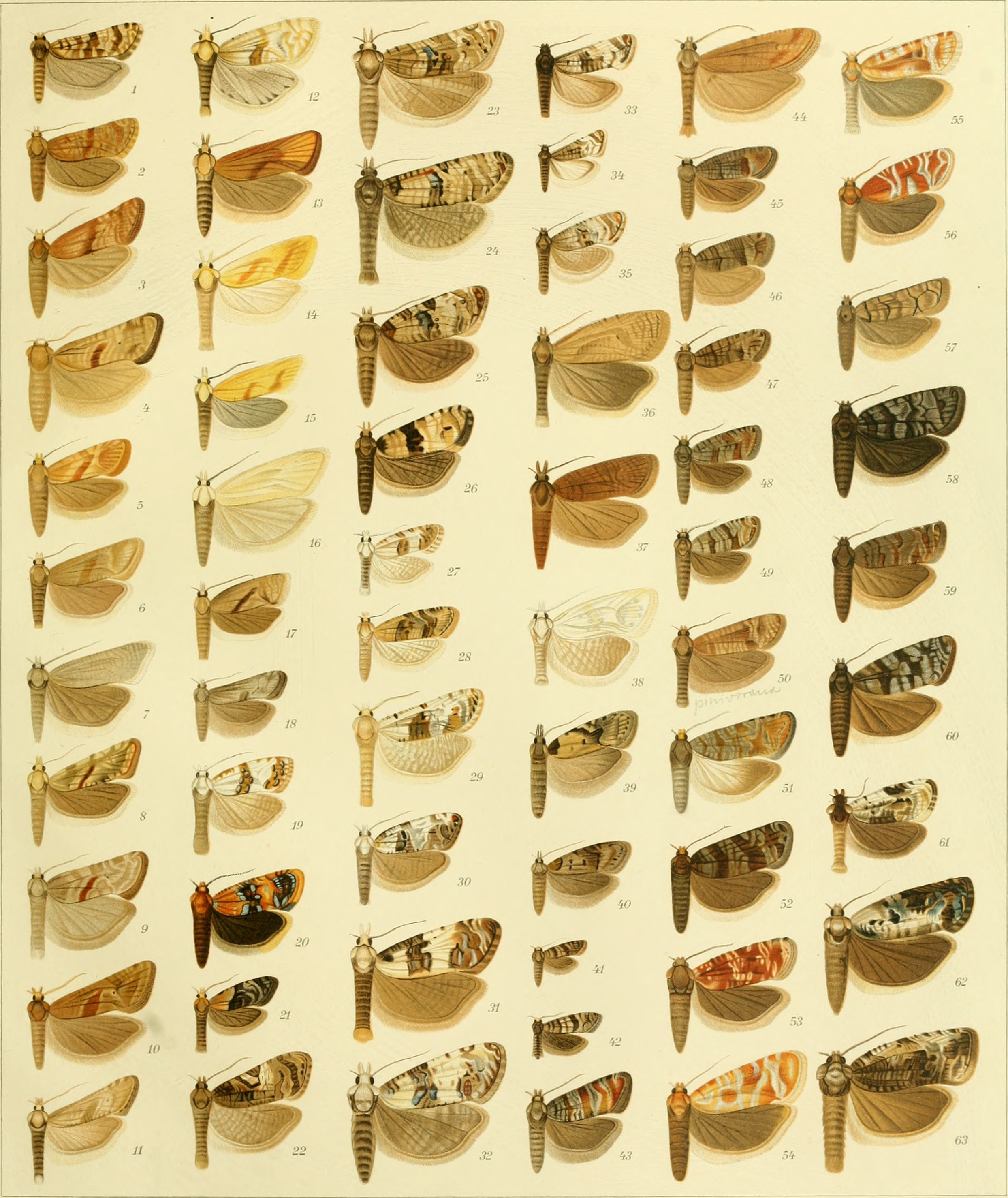
- Cochylimorpha declivana in Kennel Die palaearktischen tortriciden figure 17 female

Scientific classification
- Kingdom: Animalia
- Phylum: Arthropoda
- Clade: Pancrustacea
- Class: Insecta
- Order: Lepidoptera
- Family: Tortricidae
- Genus: Cochylimorpha
- Species: C. declivana

Binomial name
- Cochylimorpha declivana (Kennel, 1901)

Synonyms
- Euxanthis declivana Kennel, 1901

= Cochylimorpha declivana =

Species of moth

Cochylimorpha declivana is a species of moth of the family Tortricidae. It is found in Amur Oblast in the Russian Far East.
