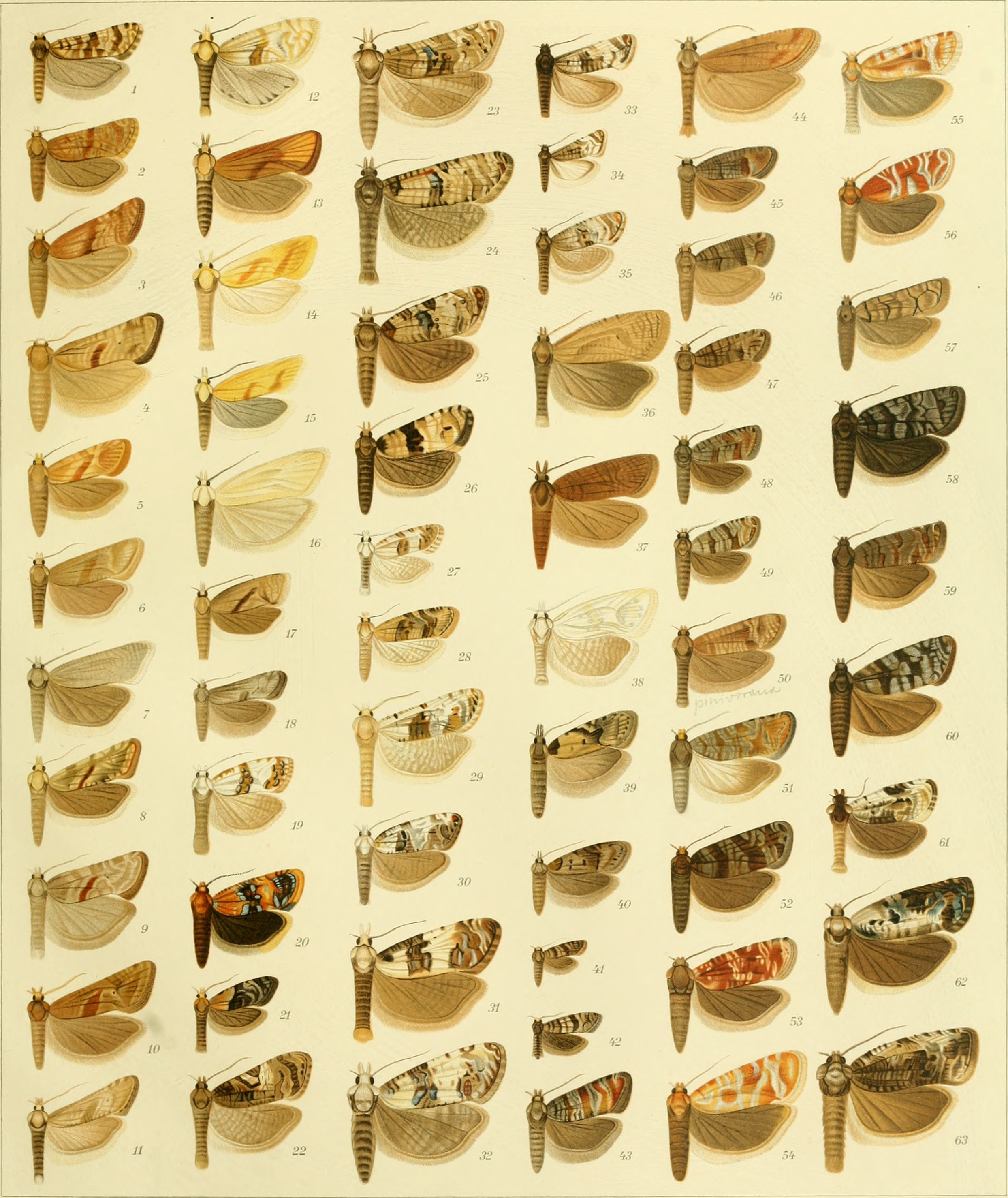
- Cochylimorpha additana in Kennel Die palaearktischen tortriciden figure 6

Scientific classification
- Kingdom: Animalia
- Phylum: Arthropoda
- Clade: Pancrustacea
- Class: Insecta
- Order: Lepidoptera
- Family: Tortricidae
- Genus: Cochylimorpha
- Species: C. additana

Binomial name
- Cochylimorpha additana (Kennel, 1901)

Synonyms
- Euxanthis additana Kennel, 1901

= Cochylimorpha additana =

Species of moth

Cochylimorpha additana is a species of moth of the family Tortricidae. It is found in Algeria.
