= Cochylimorpha coloratana =

Scientific classification
- Kingdom: Animalia
- Phylum: Arthropoda
- Clade: Pancrustacea
- Class: Insecta
- Order: Lepidoptera
- Family: Tortricidae
- Genus: Cochylimorpha
- Species: C. coloratana

Binomial name
- Cochylimorpha coloratana (Kennel, 1899)

Synonyms
- Cochylis coloratana Kennel, 1899

Species of moth

Cochylimorpha coloratana is a species of moth of the family Tortricidae. It is found in Saisan in south-western Siberia.
