= Cochylimorpha despectana =

Scientific classification
- Kingdom: Animalia
- Phylum: Arthropoda
- Clade: Pancrustacea
- Class: Insecta
- Order: Lepidoptera
- Family: Tortricidae
- Genus: Cochylimorpha
- Species: C. despectana

Binomial name
- Cochylimorpha despectana (Kennel, 1899)

Synonyms
- Cochylis despectana Kennel, 1899; Euxanthis uncinatana Kennel, 1901

Species of moth

Cochylimorpha despectana is a species of moth of the family Tortricidae. It is found in Central Asia (Altai, Margelan, Alai).
