= Cochylimorpha eburneana =

Scientific classification
- Kingdom: Animalia
- Phylum: Arthropoda
- Clade: Pancrustacea
- Class: Insecta
- Order: Lepidoptera
- Family: Tortricidae
- Genus: Cochylimorpha
- Species: C. eburneana

Binomial name
- Cochylimorpha eburneana (Kennel, 1899)

Synonyms
- Cochylis eburneana Kennel, 1899

Species of moth

Cochylimorpha eburneana is a species of moth of the family Tortricidae. It is found in Asia Minor, Turkey, Central Asia, Afghanistan, Armenia and Iran.
