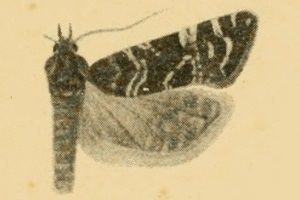

Scientific classification
- Domain: Eukaryota
- Kingdom: Animalia
- Phylum: Arthropoda
- Class: Insecta
- Order: Lepidoptera
- Family: Tortricidae
- Genus: Cochylimorpha
- Species: C. perturbatana

Binomial name
- Cochylimorpha perturbatana (Kennel, 1900)

Synonyms
- Euxanthis perturbatana Kennel, 1900; Euxanthis herminiana Kennel, 1919

= Cochylimorpha perturbatana =

Species of moth

Cochylimorpha perturbatana is a species of moth of the family Tortricidae. It is found in China (Xinjiang) and Russia.

The wingspan is 20–27 mm. Adults have been recorded from wing from July to August.
