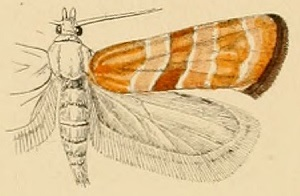

Scientific classification
- Kingdom: Animalia
- Phylum: Arthropoda
- Clade: Pancrustacea
- Class: Insecta
- Order: Lepidoptera
- Family: Tortricidae
- Genus: Cochylimorpha
- Species: C. hedemanniana

Binomial name
- Cochylimorpha hedemanniana (Snellen, 1883)

Synonyms
- Conchylis hedemanniana Snellen, 1883; Euxanthis rectifascia Filipjev, 1924

= Cochylimorpha hedemanniana =

Species of moth

Cochylimorpha hedemanniana is a species of moth of the family Tortricidae. It is found in China (Anhui, Beijing, Hebei, Heilongjiang, Henan, Hubei, Jiangsu, Liaoning, Ningxia, Shaanxi, Shandong, Shanxi Tianjin, Yunnan), Japan, Korea and Russia (southern Urals, Amur, Minussinsk, Jakowlewka, Blagowjestschensk, Winogradowka).

The wingspan is 13–19 mm. Adults have been recorded on the wing between May and August.
