= Cochylimorpha clathratana =

Scientific classification
- Kingdom: Animalia
- Phylum: Arthropoda
- Clade: Pancrustacea
- Class: Insecta
- Order: Lepidoptera
- Family: Tortricidae
- Genus: Cochylimorpha
- Species: C. clathratana

Binomial name
- Cochylimorpha clathratana (Staudinger, 1880)

Synonyms
- Cochylis clathratana Staudinger, 1880

Species of moth

Cochylimorpha clathratana is a species of moth of the family Tortricidae. It is found in European Russia.

The wingspan is 15–16 mm. Adults have been recorded on wing from May to August.
