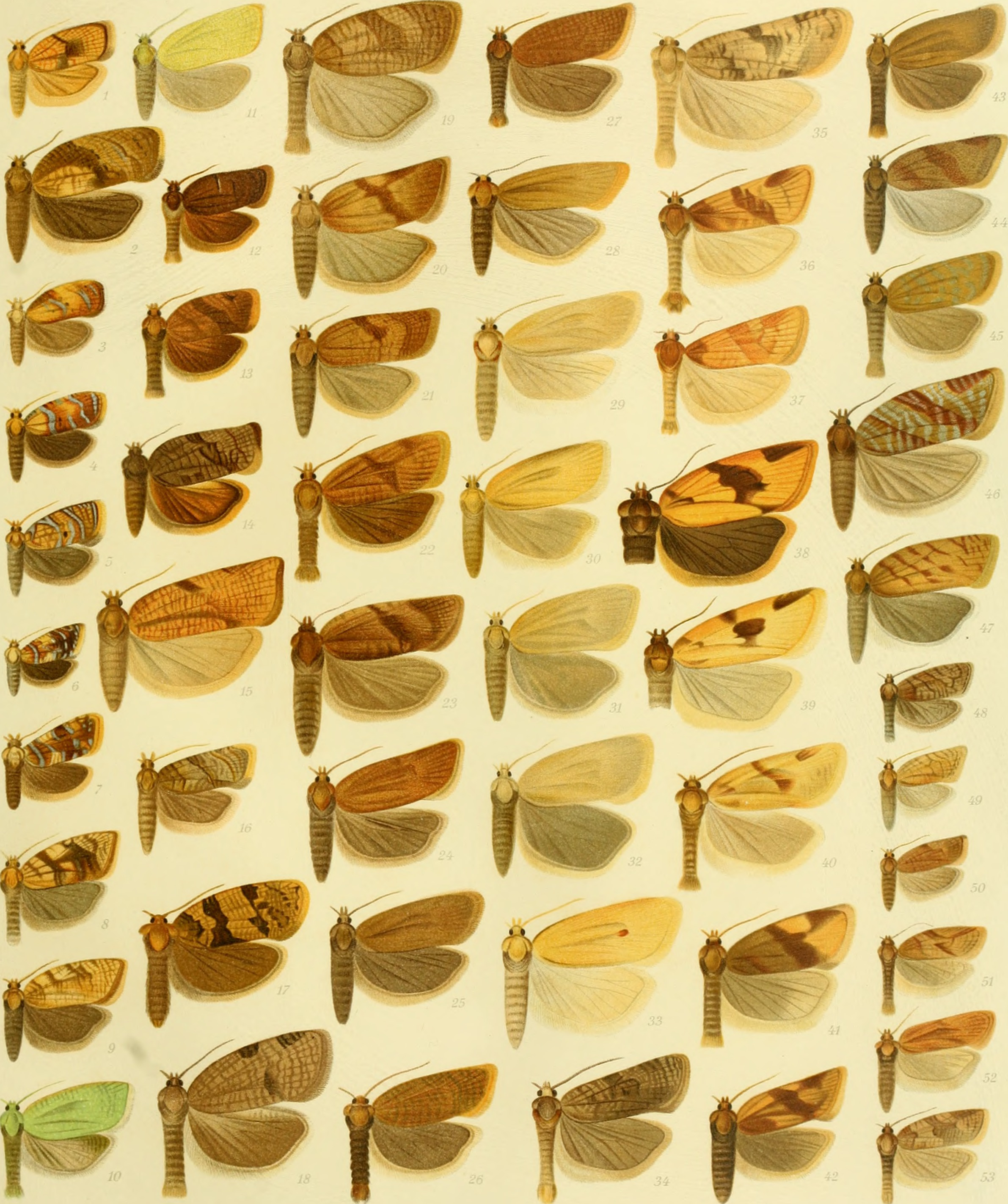
- Acleris stibiana in Kennel Die palaearktischen tortriciden figure 3 male type

Scientific classification
- Kingdom: Animalia
- Phylum: Arthropoda
- Class: Insecta
- Order: Lepidoptera
- Family: Tortricidae
- Genus: Acleris
- Species: A. stibiana

Binomial name
- Acleris stibiana (Snellen, 1883)

Synonyms
- Tortrix stibiana Snellen, 1883; Croesia stibiana

= Acleris stibiana =

Species of moth

Acleris stibiana is a species of moth of the family Tortricidae. It is found in China, Russia (Siberia) and Japan.

The wingspan is about 16 mm.

The larvae feed on Viburnum burejanum.
