= Cochylimorpha gracilens =

Scientific classification
- Domain: Eukaryota
- Kingdom: Animalia
- Phylum: Arthropoda
- Class: Insecta
- Order: Lepidoptera
- Family: Tortricidae
- Genus: Cochylimorpha
- Species: C. gracilens

Binomial name
- Cochylimorpha gracilens (Ge, 1992)

Synonyms
- Stenodes gracilens Ge, 1992

Species of moth

Cochylimorpha gracilens is a species of moth of the family Tortricidae.

It is found in Tibet.
