= Cochylimorpha africana =

Scientific classification
- Kingdom: Animalia
- Phylum: Arthropoda
- Class: Insecta
- Order: Lepidoptera
- Family: Tortricidae
- Genus: Cochylimorpha
- Species: C. africana

Binomial name
- Cochylimorpha africana Aarvik, 2010

Species of moth

Cochylimorpha africana is a species of moth of the family Tortricidae. It is found in Tanzania. The habitat consists of forests.

The wingspan is 12–16 mm.

== Etymology ==
The species is named after the continent where the material was collected, Africa.
