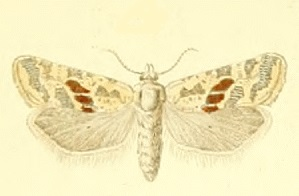

Scientific classification
- Kingdom: Animalia
- Phylum: Arthropoda
- Clade: Pancrustacea
- Class: Insecta
- Order: Lepidoptera
- Family: Tortricidae
- Genus: Cochylimorpha
- Species: C. halophilana

Binomial name
- Cochylimorpha halophilana (Christoph, 1872)

Synonyms
- Conchylis halophilana Christoph, 1872; Conchylis clavana Constant, 1888

= Cochylimorpha halophilana =

Species of moth

Cochylimorpha halophilana is a species of moth of the family Tortricidae. It is found in France, Italy, Hungary, Slovakia, Romania, Russia (Sarepta, the Caucasus), the Near East, eastern Afghanistan and Iran.

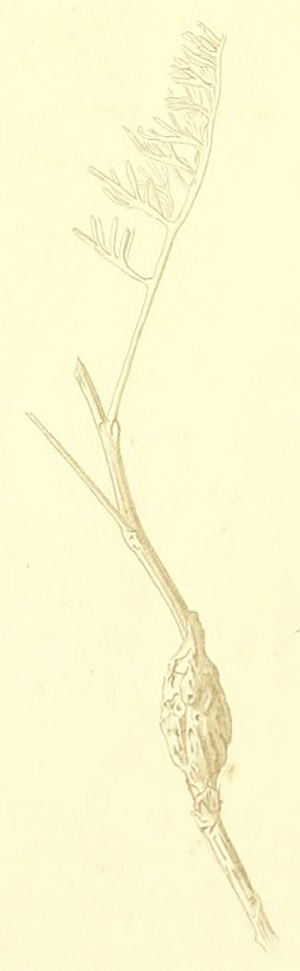
Feeding damage

The wingspan is 19–21 mm. Adults have been recorded on wing in July and August.

Larvae have been recorded feeding on Artemisia gallica.

== Subspecies ==
- Cochylimorpha halophilana halophilana
- Cochylimorpha halophilana adriatica Huemer, 2000 (from Slovakia to south-eastern Europe, from the Caucasus to Iran and Afghanistan)
- Cochylimorpha halophilana clavana (Constant, 1888) (France)
