= Cochylimorpha thomasi =

Scientific classification
- Kingdom: Animalia
- Phylum: Arthropoda
- Clade: Pancrustacea
- Class: Insecta
- Order: Lepidoptera
- Family: Tortricidae
- Genus: Cochylimorpha
- Species: C. thomasi

Binomial name
- Cochylimorpha thomasi Karisch, 2003

Species of moth

Cochylimorpha thomasi is a species of moth of the family Tortricidae. It is found in Turkey.
