= Cochylimorpha pseudoalternana =

Scientific classification
- Kingdom: Animalia
- Phylum: Arthropoda
- Clade: Pancrustacea
- Class: Insecta
- Order: Lepidoptera
- Family: Tortricidae
- Genus: Cochylimorpha
- Species: C. pseudoalternana

Binomial name
- Cochylimorpha pseudoalternana (Chambon & Khous, 1993)

Synonyms
- Stenodes pseudoalternana Chambon & Khous, 1993

Species of moth

Cochylimorpha pseudoalternana is a species of moth of the family Tortricidae. It is found in Algeria.
