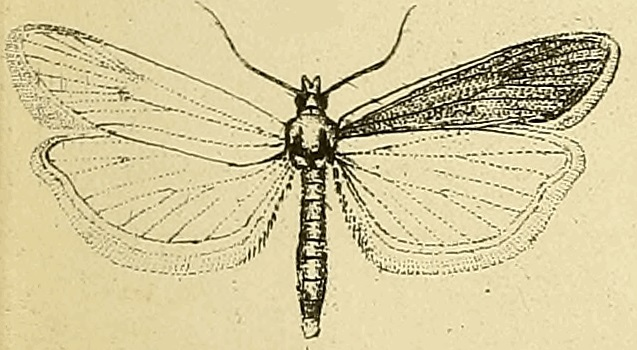

Scientific classification
- Kingdom: Animalia
- Phylum: Arthropoda
- Clade: Pancrustacea
- Class: Insecta
- Order: Lepidoptera
- Family: Tortricidae
- Genus: Cochylimorpha
- Species: C. nodulana

Binomial name
- Cochylimorpha nodulana (Möschler, 1862)

Synonyms
- Sciaphila nodulana Möschler, 1862

= Cochylimorpha nodulana =

Species of moth

Cochylimorpha nodulana is a species of moth of the family Tortricidae. It is found in Russia (Sarepta, Uralsk, Tuva), Kazakhstan, northern Syria, Armenia, Mongolia and Iran.

The wingspan is 21–23 mm. Adults have been recorded from wing in August.
