= Cochylimorpha nankinensis =

Scientific classification
- Kingdom: Animalia
- Phylum: Arthropoda
- Clade: Pancrustacea
- Class: Insecta
- Order: Lepidoptera
- Family: Tortricidae
- Genus: Cochylimorpha
- Species: C. nankinensis

Binomial name
- Cochylimorpha nankinensis (Razowski, 1964)

Synonyms
- Stenodes nankinensis Razowski, 1964

Species of moth

Cochylimorpha nankinensis is a species of moth of the family Tortricidae. It is found in China (Guangxi, Henan, Hong Kong, Hubei, Jiangsu, Shaanxi, Tianjin, Zhejiang) and Korea.
