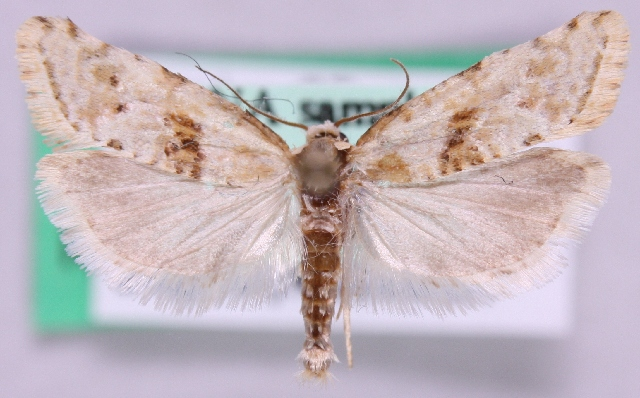

Scientific classification
- Kingdom: Animalia
- Phylum: Arthropoda
- Clade: Pancrustacea
- Class: Insecta
- Order: Lepidoptera
- Family: Tortricidae
- Genus: Cochylimorpha
- Species: C. straminea

Binomial name
- Cochylimorpha straminea (Haworth, [1811])

Synonyms
- Tortrix straminea Haworth, [1811]; Phalonia glaisana Lucas, 1942; Euxanthis lentiginosana Kennel, 1901; Euxanthis numidana Turati, 1924; Euxanthis pallens Lucas, 1954; Euxanthis ramessana Rebel, 1912; Euxanthis scabiosana Kennel, 1901; Tortrix stramineana Haworth, [1828]; Conchylis substraminea Ragonot, 1895; Cochylis sudana Duponchel, in Godart, 1836; Cochylis tischerana Treischke, 1830; Euxanthis translucidana Turati, 1934; Euxanthis straminea ab. wiatkensis Krulikowsky, 1908

= Cochylimorpha straminea =

Species of moth

Cochylimorpha straminea, the straw conch, is a species of moth of the family Tortricidae. It is found in most of Europe, Morocco, Algeria, Tunisia, Asia Minor, the Palestinian territories, Iraq, Syria, Armenia, Transcaspia, Turkmenistan and Iran (the Elburz Mountains).

The wingspan is 13–21 mm. The costa of the forewings is almost straight. The ground colour is whitish-ochreous, clouded and strigulated with darker and a few dark fuscous scales on costa. There is an ochreous-brown streak from the dorsum before the middle and parallel to the termen, reaching rather more than half across the wing. There is a fuscous dorsal dot before the tornus and a brownish terminal line. The hind wings are rather light grey. The larva is whitish yellowish; head black; plate of 2 brown. Julius von Kennel provides a full description.

There are two generations per year, with adults on wing from May to July and again from late August to September.

The larvae feed on Scabiosa, Artemisia and Centaurea species.
