= Cochylimorpha innotatana =

Scientific classification
- Kingdom: Animalia
- Phylum: Arthropoda
- Clade: Pancrustacea
- Class: Insecta
- Order: Lepidoptera
- Family: Tortricidae
- Genus: Cochylimorpha
- Species: C. innotatana

Binomial name
- Cochylimorpha innotatana (Warren, 1888)

Synonyms
- Xanthosetia innotatana Warren, 1888

Species of moth

Cochylimorpha innotatana is a species of moth of the family Tortricidae. It is found in India.
