= Cochylimorpha kenneli =

Scientific classification
- Kingdom: Animalia
- Phylum: Arthropoda
- Clade: Pancrustacea
- Class: Insecta
- Order: Lepidoptera
- Family: Tortricidae
- Genus: Cochylimorpha
- Species: C. kenneli

Binomial name
- Cochylimorpha kenneli (Razowski, 1967)

Synonyms
- Stenodes kenneli Razowski, 1967; Euxanthis meridiolana Kennel, 1901 (preocc.)

Species of moth

Cochylimorpha kenneli is a species of moth of the family Tortricidae. It is found in Uzbekistan.
