= Cochylimorpha elegans =

Scientific classification
- Kingdom: Animalia
- Phylum: Arthropoda
- Clade: Pancrustacea
- Class: Insecta
- Order: Lepidoptera
- Family: Tortricidae
- Genus: Cochylimorpha
- Species: C. elegans

Binomial name
- Cochylimorpha elegans (Razowski, 1963)

Synonyms
- Stenodes elegans Razowski, 1963; Acta zool. cracov. 8: 264, f. 29-32

Species of moth

Cochylimorpha elegans is a moth species in the family Tortricidae. It is found in Iran (the type location is Khorassan, Kouh-i-Binaloud).
