= Cochylimorpha santolinana =

Scientific classification
- Kingdom: Animalia
- Phylum: Arthropoda
- Clade: Pancrustacea
- Class: Insecta
- Order: Lepidoptera
- Family: Tortricidae
- Genus: Cochylimorpha
- Species: C. santolinana

Binomial name
- Cochylimorpha santolinana (Staudinger, 1871)

Synonyms
- Conchylis santolinana Staudinger, 1871

Species of moth

Cochylimorpha santolinana is a species of moth of the family Tortricidae. It is found in Spain.

The wingspan is 14–16 mm. Adults have been recorded on wing in March and April.

The larvae feed on Santolina rosmarinifolia. Larvae can be found from August to September.
