= Cochylimorpha meridiolana =

Scientific classification
- Kingdom: Animalia
- Phylum: Arthropoda
- Clade: Pancrustacea
- Class: Insecta
- Order: Lepidoptera
- Family: Tortricidae
- Genus: Cochylimorpha
- Species: C. meridiolana

Binomial name
- Cochylimorpha meridiolana (Ragonot, 1894)

Synonyms
- Conchylis meridiolana Ragonot, 1894; Cochylis ochrostriana Kennel, 1899

Species of moth

Cochylimorpha meridiolana is a species of moth of the family Tortricidae. It is found in Central Asia (Transcaspia: Tura, Kuldscha, Osch, Samarkand, Mesopotamia, Alai, Turkestan).
