= Cochylimorpha tamerlana =

Scientific classification
- Kingdom: Animalia
- Phylum: Arthropoda
- Clade: Pancrustacea
- Class: Insecta
- Order: Lepidoptera
- Family: Tortricidae
- Genus: Cochylimorpha
- Species: C. tamerlana

Binomial name
- Cochylimorpha tamerlana (Ragonot, 1894)

Synonyms
- Conchylis tamerlana Ragonot, 1894

Species of moth

Cochylimorpha tamerlana is a species of moth of the family Tortricidae. It is found in Transcaspia and Turkmenistan.
