= Cochylimorpha langeana =

Scientific classification
- Kingdom: Animalia
- Phylum: Arthropoda
- Clade: Pancrustacea
- Class: Insecta
- Order: Lepidoptera
- Family: Tortricidae
- Genus: Cochylimorpha
- Species: C. langeana

Binomial name
- Cochylimorpha langeana (Kalchberg, 1898)

Synonyms
- Conchylis langeana Kalchberg, 1898; Euxanthoides anticiphas Razowski, 1963; Euxanthis anticyphas Meyrick, 1936; Euxanthoides hannemanni Razowski, 1961

Species of moth

Cochylimorpha langeana is a species of moth of the family Tortricidae. It is found in Turkey, Syria, the Palestinian territories, Lebanon and Iran.
