= Cochylimorpha tiraculana =

Scientific classification
- Kingdom: Animalia
- Phylum: Arthropoda
- Clade: Pancrustacea
- Class: Insecta
- Order: Lepidoptera
- Family: Tortricidae
- Genus: Cochylimorpha
- Species: C. tiraculana

Binomial name
- Cochylimorpha tiraculana (Bassi & Scaramozzino, 1989)

Synonyms
- Stenodes tiraculana Bassi & Scaramozzino, 1989

Species of moth

Cochylimorpha tiraculana is a species of moth of the family Tortricidae. It is found in France, Italy and Switzerland.

The wingspan is 14–18 mm. Adults have been recorded on wing from July to August.
