= Cochylimorpha jucundana =

Scientific classification
- Domain: Eukaryota
- Kingdom: Animalia
- Phylum: Arthropoda
- Class: Insecta
- Order: Lepidoptera
- Family: Tortricidae
- Genus: Cochylimorpha
- Species: C. jucundana

Binomial name
- Cochylimorpha jucundana (Treitschke, 1835)

Synonyms
- Cochylis jucundana Treitschke, 1835

Species of moth

Cochylimorpha jucundana is a species of moth of the family Tortricidae. It is found in Spain, France, Italy, Switzerland, Slovenia, Bosnia and Herzegovina, Croatia, Hungary, Romania, North Macedonia and Russia.

The wingspan is about 16 mm. Adults have been recorded from wing in June.
