= Cochylimorpha scrophulana =

Scientific classification
- Kingdom: Animalia
- Phylum: Arthropoda
- Clade: Pancrustacea
- Class: Insecta
- Order: Lepidoptera
- Family: Tortricidae
- Genus: Cochylimorpha
- Species: C. scrophulana

Binomial name
- Cochylimorpha scrophulana (Razowski, 1963)

Synonyms
- Stenodes scrophulana Razowski, 1963

Species of moth

Cochylimorpha scrophulana is a species of moth of the family Tortricidae. It is found in Fars province, Iran.

The wingspan is 20–21 mm.
