= Cochylimorpha conankinensis =

Scientific classification
- Kingdom: Animalia
- Phylum: Arthropoda
- Class: Insecta
- Order: Lepidoptera
- Family: Tortricidae
- Genus: Cochylimorpha
- Species: C. conankinensis

Binomial name
- Cochylimorpha conankinensis (Ge, 1992)

Synonyms
- Stenodes conankinensis Ge, 1992

Species of moth

Cochylimorpha conankinensis is a species of moth of the family Tortricidae. It is found in China (Gansu, Shaanxi, Sichuan).
