= Cochylimorpha arenosana =

Scientific classification
- Kingdom: Animalia
- Phylum: Arthropoda
- Clade: Pancrustacea
- Class: Insecta
- Order: Lepidoptera
- Family: Tortricidae
- Genus: Cochylimorpha
- Species: C. arenosana

Binomial name
- Cochylimorpha arenosana Kuznetzov Jalava & Kullberg, 1998

Species of moth

Cochylimorpha arenosana is a species of moth of the family Tortricidae. It is found in northern Mongolia and Tuva, Russia. The habitat consists of sand dunes.
