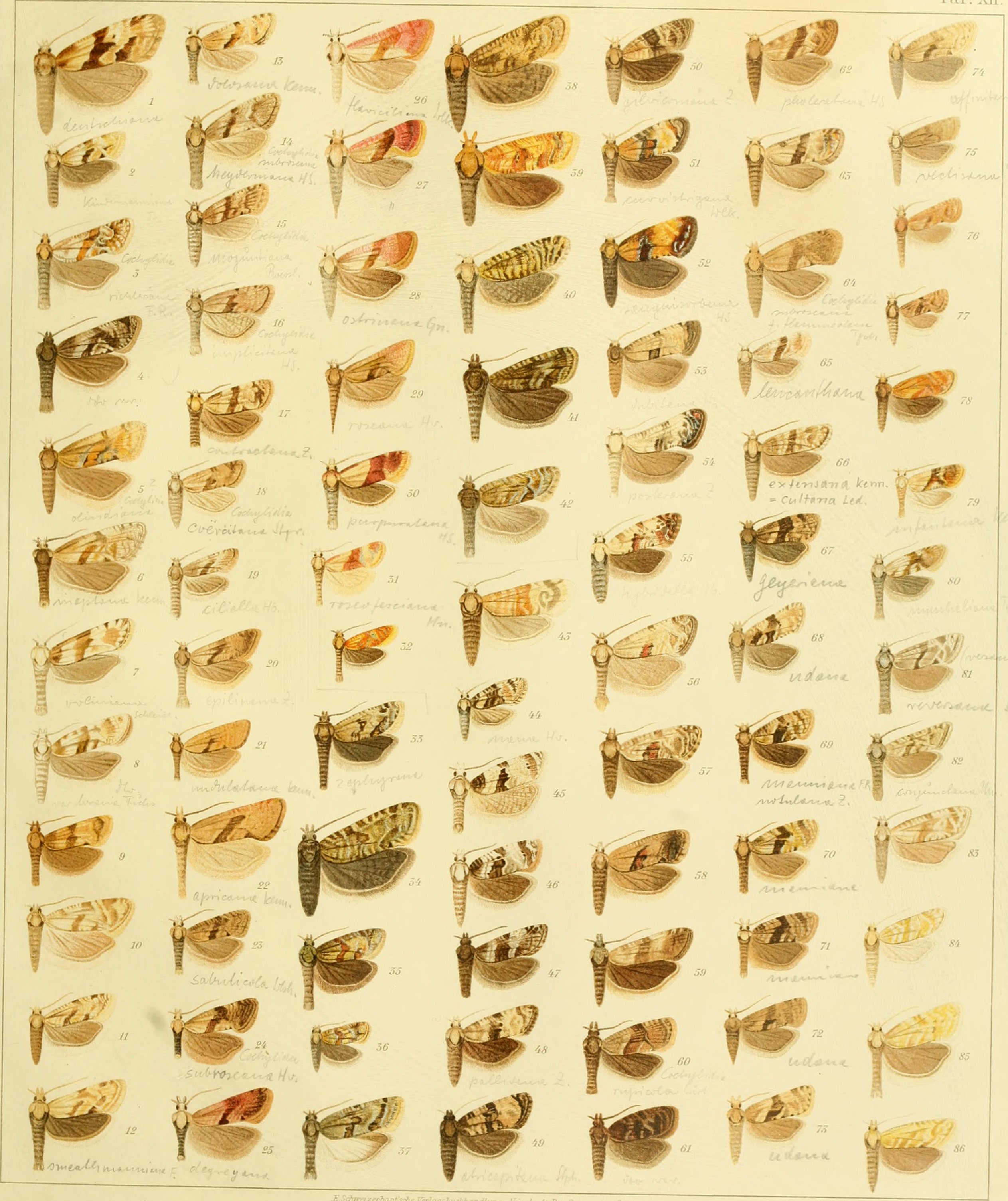
- in Kennel Die palaearktischen tortriciden figure 85

Scientific classification
- Kingdom: Animalia
- Phylum: Arthropoda
- Clade: Pancrustacea
- Class: Insecta
- Order: Lepidoptera
- Family: Tortricidae
- Genus: Cochylimorpha
- Species: C. perfusana

Binomial name
- Cochylimorpha perfusana (Guenee, 1845)

Synonyms
- Argyrolepia perfusana Guenee, 1845; Tortrix (Cochylis) callosana Herrich-Schaffer, 1851; Euxanthis dorsimaculana Preissecker, 1908

= Cochylimorpha perfusana =

Species of moth

Cochylimorpha perfusana is a species of moth of the family Tortricidae. It is found in France, Austria, Switzerland, Italy, Slovenia, Croatia, Hungary and Romania, as well as on Corsica.

The wingspan is 18–23 mm. Adults have been recorded on wing from May to September.

The larvae feed on Centaurea stoebe and Centaurea triumfetti. Larvae can be found in June.
