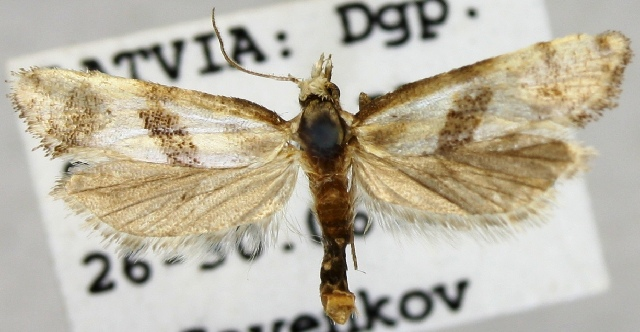

Scientific classification
- Kingdom: Animalia
- Phylum: Arthropoda
- Clade: Pancrustacea
- Class: Insecta
- Order: Lepidoptera
- Family: Tortricidae
- Genus: Cochylimorpha
- Species: C. woliniana

Binomial name
- Cochylimorpha woliniana (Schleich, 1868)

Synonyms
- Conchylis woliniana Schleich, 1868; Conchylis lorana Fuchs, 1897; Stenodes woliniana luteola Kuznetzov, 1975

= Cochylimorpha woliniana =

Species of moth

Cochylimorpha woliniana is a species of moth of the family Tortricidae. It is found in Sweden, France, Germany, Denmark, Austria, Switzerland, Italy, the Czech Republic, Slovakia, Hungary, Bulgaria, Romania, Poland, Latvia, Ukraine, Russia, Kyrgyzstan and Mongolia.

The wingspan is 13–17 mm (0.51–0.67 in). Adults have been recorded from wing from June to August.

The larvae feed on Artemisia absinthium. Larvae can be found from August to May.

== Subspecies ==
- Cochylimorpha woliniana woliniana
- Cochylimorpha woliniana luteola (Kuznetzov, 1975) (Kyrgyzstan, western Siberia, Mongolia)
