= Cochylimorpha maleropa =

Scientific classification
- Kingdom: Animalia
- Phylum: Arthropoda
- Clade: Pancrustacea
- Class: Insecta
- Order: Lepidoptera
- Family: Tortricidae
- Genus: Cochylimorpha
- Species: C. maleropa

Binomial name
- Cochylimorpha maleropa (Meyrick in Caradja & Meyrick, 1937)

Synonyms
- Euxanthis maleropa Meyrick in Caradja & Meyrick, 1937

Species of moth

Cochylimorpha maleropa is a species of moth of the family Tortricidae. It is found in China (Shaanxi, Yunnan).
