= Cochylimorpha cuspidata =

Scientific classification
- Kingdom: Animalia
- Phylum: Arthropoda
- Clade: Pancrustacea
- Class: Insecta
- Order: Lepidoptera
- Family: Tortricidae
- Genus: Cochylimorpha
- Species: C. cuspidata

Binomial name
- Cochylimorpha cuspidata (Ge, 1992)

Synonyms
- Stenodes cuspidata Ge, 1992

Species of moth

Cochylimorpha cuspidata is a species of moth of the family Tortricidae. It is found in China (Anhui, Beijing, Gansu, Hebei, Heilongjiang, Henan, Hubei, Inner Mongolia, Liaoning, Ningxia, Shaanxi, Shanxi, Tianjin) and Korea.
