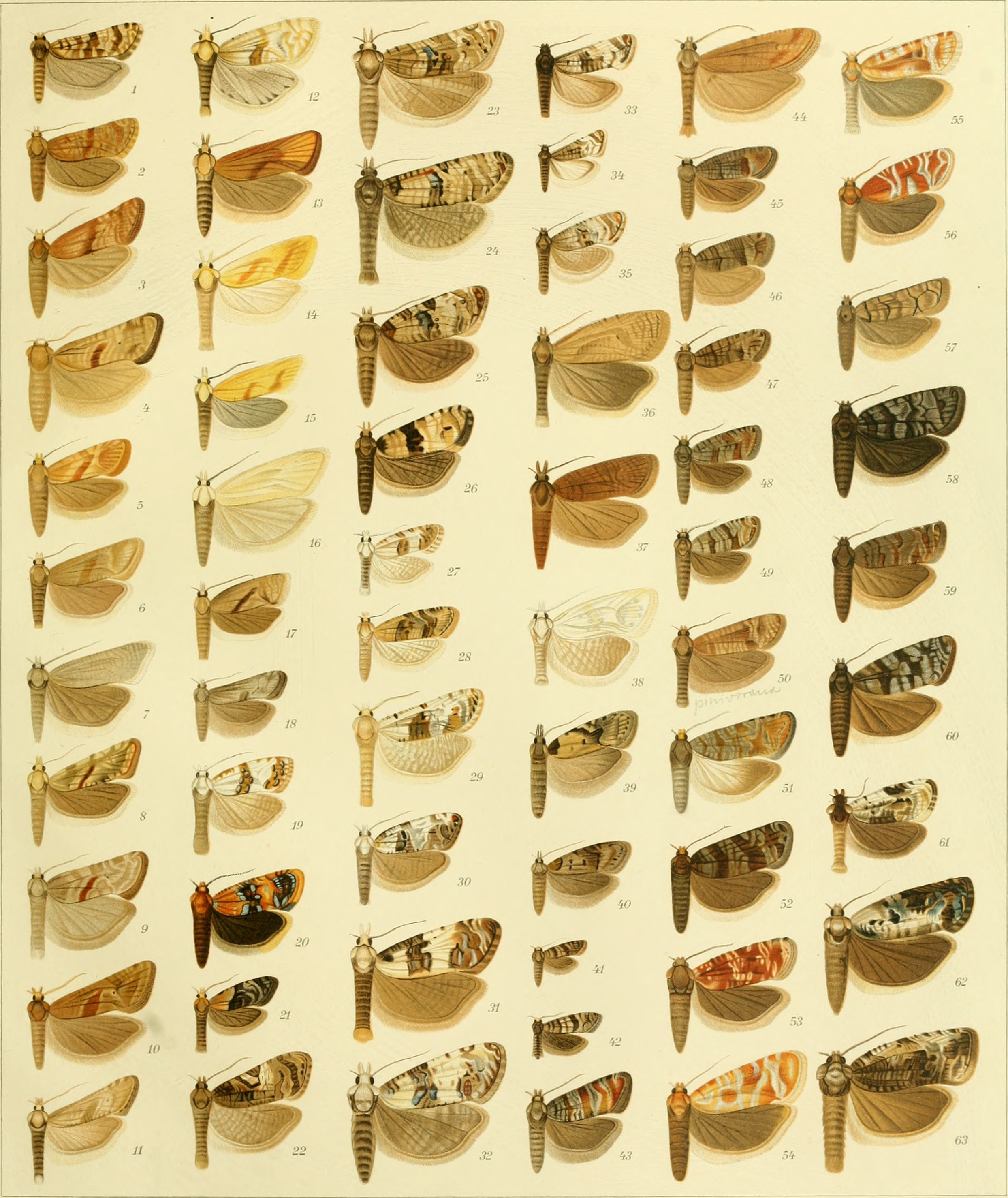
- Cochylimorpha obliquana in Kennel Die palaearktischen tortriciden figure 8

Scientific classification
- Domain: Eukaryota
- Kingdom: Animalia
- Phylum: Arthropoda
- Class: Insecta
- Order: Lepidoptera
- Family: Tortricidae
- Genus: Cochylimorpha
- Species: C. obliquana

Binomial name
- Cochylimorpha obliquana (Eversmann, 1844)

Synonyms
- Cochylis obliquana Eversmann, 1844; Conchylis coenosana Mann, 1867

= Cochylimorpha obliquana =

Species of moth

Cochylimorpha obliquana is a species of moth of the family Tortricidae. It is found in Austria, Slovakia, Hungary, Romania and Russia (Sarepta, Uralsk, Emba, northern Caucasus).

The wingspan is 13–19 mm. Adults have been recorded on wing from June to September.

The larvae feed on Artemisia maritima.
