= Cochylimorpha mongolicana =

Scientific classification
- Domain: Eukaryota
- Kingdom: Animalia
- Phylum: Arthropoda
- Class: Insecta
- Order: Lepidoptera
- Family: Tortricidae
- Genus: Cochylimorpha
- Species: C. mongolicana

Binomial name
- Cochylimorpha mongolicana (Ragonot, 1894)

Synonyms
- Conchylis mongolicana Ragonot, 1894

Species of moth

Cochylimorpha mongolicana is a species of moth of the family Tortricidae. It is found in Central Asia (Transcaspia: Tura, Saisan, Kuldja, Turkestan).
