= Cochylimorpha brandti =

Scientific classification
- Kingdom: Animalia
- Phylum: Arthropoda
- Class: Insecta
- Order: Lepidoptera
- Family: Tortricidae
- Genus: Cochylimorpha
- Species: C. brandti

Binomial name
- Cochylimorpha brandti (Razowski, 1963)

Synonyms
- Stenodes brandti Razowski, 1963

Species of moth

Cochylimorpha brandti is a species of moth of the family Tortricidae. It is found in Iran (Khorasan, Mashhad: the Binalud Mountains and the Elburz Mountains).
