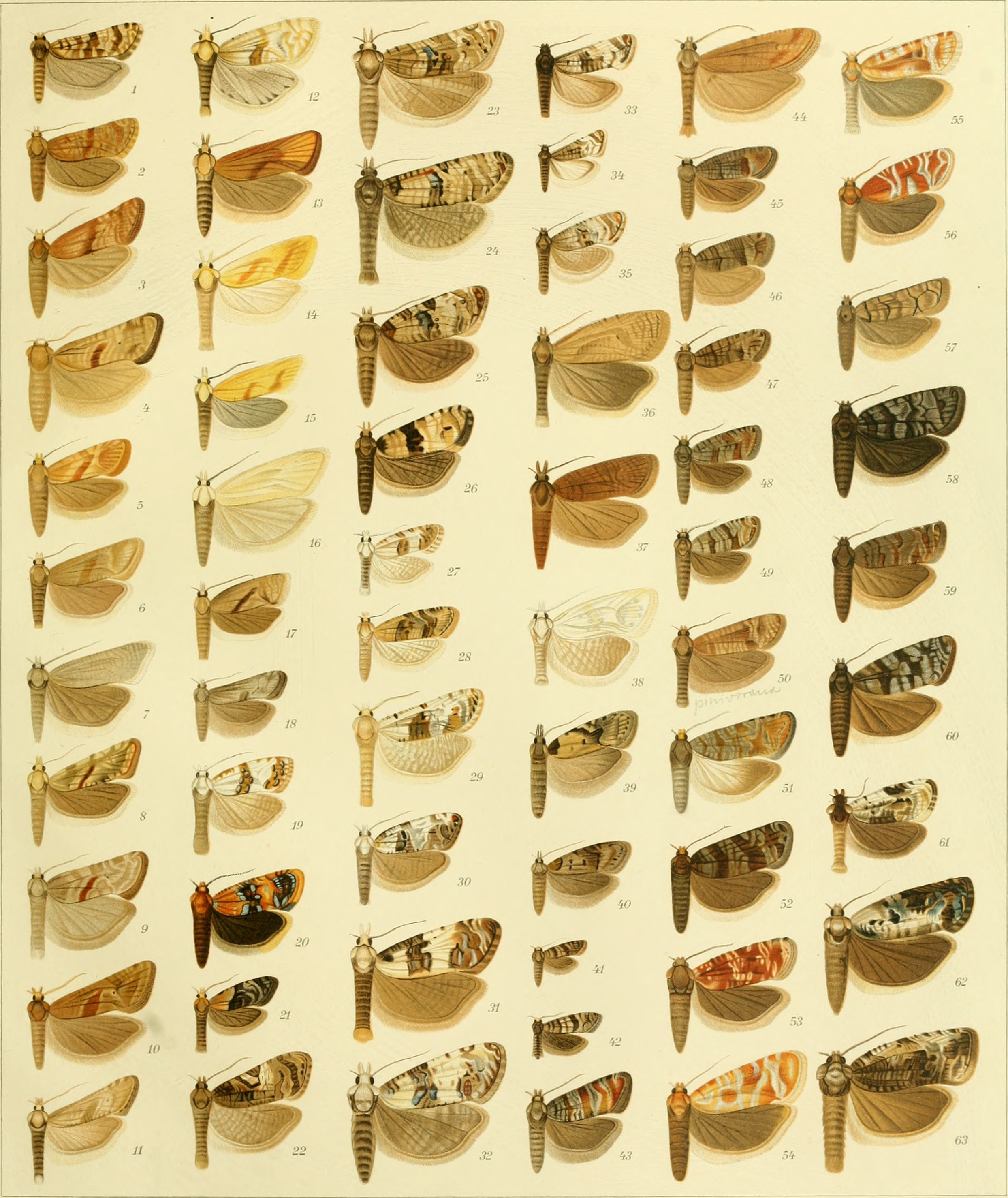
- Cochylimorpha peucedana in Kennel Die palaearktischen tortriciden figures 1 Phalonia corsicana Walsingham, 1898 (synonym) and 2 female

Scientific classification
- Kingdom: Animalia
- Phylum: Arthropoda
- Clade: Pancrustacea
- Class: Insecta
- Order: Lepidoptera
- Family: Tortricidae
- Genus: Cochylimorpha
- Species: C. peucedana

Binomial name
- Cochylimorpha peucedana (Ragonot, 1889)

Synonyms
- Cochylis peucedana Ragonot, 1889; Stenodes austriacana Razowski, 1964; Conchylis austriana Caradja, 1916; Conchylis austrinana Chretien, 1902; Phalonia corsicana Walsingham, 1898; Conchylis austrinana var. florana Chretien, 1905; Cochylimorpha peusedanana Brown, 2005; Conchylis toreumatana Turati, 1913

= Cochylimorpha peucedana =

Species of moth

Cochylimorpha peucedana is a species of moth of the family Tortricidae. It is found in France, Spain and Portugal, as well as on Sicily, Corsica and Sardinia.

The wingspan is 9–19 mm.

The larvae feed on Peucedanum species and Santolina chamaecyparissus. Larvae can be found in May and June.
