= Cochylimorpha salinarida =

Scientific classification
- Kingdom: Animalia
- Phylum: Arthropoda
- Clade: Pancrustacea
- Class: Insecta
- Order: Lepidoptera
- Family: Tortricidae
- Genus: Cochylimorpha
- Species: C. salinarida

Binomial name
- Cochylimorpha salinarida Groenen & Larsen, 2003

Species of moth

Cochylimorpha salinarida is a species of moth of the family Tortricidae. It is found in Alicante, Spain.

The wingspan is 15–21 mm.
