= Cochylimorpha blandana =

Scientific classification
- Kingdom: Animalia
- Phylum: Arthropoda
- Clade: Pancrustacea
- Class: Insecta
- Order: Lepidoptera
- Family: Tortricidae
- Genus: Cochylimorpha
- Species: C. blandana

Binomial name
- Cochylimorpha blandana (Eversmann, 1844)

Synonyms
- Tortrix blandana Eversmann, 1844; Cochylis punctulatana Kennel, 1899

Species of moth

Cochylimorpha blandana is a species of moth of the family Tortricidae. It is found in Ukraine, Russia and the Near East.

The wingspan is 16–17 mm (0.63–0.67 in). Adults have been recorded on wing in July.
