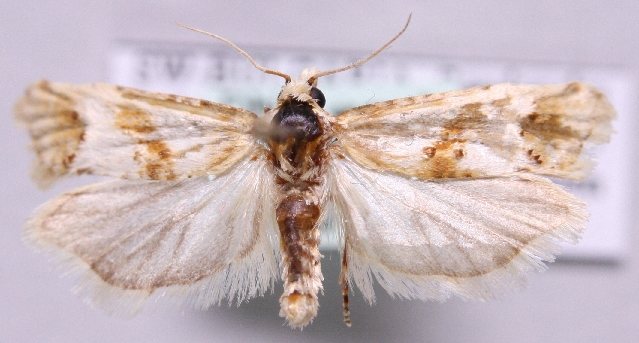
- Cochylimorpha alternana

Scientific classification
- Kingdom: Animalia
- Phylum: Arthropoda
- Class: Insecta
- Order: Lepidoptera
- Family: Tortricidae
- Tribe: Cochylini
- Genus: Cochylimorpha; Razowski, 1959

Type species
- Cochylis faviliana Staudinger, 1859.

= Cochylimorpha =

Genus of tortrix moths

Cochylimorpha is a genus of moths of the family Tortricidae.

== Species ==
- Cochylimorpha acriapex (Razowski, 1967)
- Cochylimorpha additana (Kennel, 1901)
- Cochylimorpha africana Aarvik, 2010
- Cochylimorpha agenjoi (Razowski, 1963)
- Cochylimorpha alternana (Curtis, 1831)
- Cochylimorpha alticolana (Razowski, 1964)
- Cochylimorpha amabilis (Meyrick, in Caradja, 1931)
- Cochylimorpha arenosana (Kuznetzov Jalava & Kullberg, 1998)
- Cochylimorpha armeniana (de Joannis, 1891)
- Cochylimorpha asiana (Kennel, 1899)
- Cochylimorpha bipunctata (Bai Guo & Guo, 1996)
- Cochylimorpha blandana (Eversmann, 1844)
- Cochylimorpha brandti (Razowski, 1963)
- Cochylimorpha centralasiae (Razowski, 1964)
- Cochylimorpha chionella (Schawerda, 1924)
- Cochylimorpha clathrana (Staudinger, 1871)
- Cochylimorpha clathratana (Staudinger, 1880)
- Cochylimorpha coloratana (Kennel, 1899)
- Cochylimorpha conankinensis (Ge, 1992)
- Cochylimorpha cultana (Lederer, 1855)
- Cochylimorpha cuspidata (Ge, 1992)
- Cochylimorpha declivana (Kennel, 1901)
- Cochylimorpha decolorella (Zeller, 1839)
- Cochylimorpha despectana (Kennel, 1899)
- Cochylimorpha diana (Kennel, 1899)
- Cochylimorpha discolorana (Kennel, 1899)
- Cochylimorpha discopunctana (Eversmann, 1844)
- Cochylimorpha eberti (Razowski, 1967)
- Cochylimorpha eburneana (Kennel, 1899)
- Cochylimorpha elegans (Razowski, 1963)
- Cochylimorpha elongana (Fischer von Röslerstamm, 1839)
- Cochylimorpha emiliana (Kennel, 1919)
- Cochylimorpha erlebachi Huemer & Trematerra, 1997
- Cochylimorpha exoterica (Meyrick, 1924)
- Cochylimorpha flaveola (Falkovitsh, 1963)
- Cochylimorpha fluens (Razowski, 1970)
- Cochylimorpha fucatana (Snellen, 1883)
- Cochylimorpha fucosa (Razowski, 1970)
- Cochylimorpha fuscimacula (Falkovitsh, 1963)
- Cochylimorpha gracilens (Ge, 1992)
- Cochylimorpha halophilana (Christoph, 1872)
- Cochylimorpha hapala (Diakonoff, 1984)
- Cochylimorpha hedemanniana (Snellen, 1883)
- Cochylimorpha hilarana (Herrich-Schäffer, 1851)
- Cochylimorpha ignicolorana Junnilainen & Nupponen, in Nupponen, Junnilainen, Nupponen & Olschwag, 2001
- Cochylimorpha innotatana (Warren, 1888)
- Cochylimorpha isocornutana (Razowski, 1964)
- Cochylimorpha jaculana (Snellen, 1883)
- Cochylimorpha jucundana (Treitschke, 1835)
- Cochylimorpha kenneli (Razowski, 1967)
- Cochylimorpha kohibabae Razowski, 2005
- Cochylimorpha kurdistana (Amsel, 1959)
- Cochylimorpha lagara (Diakonoff, 1983)
- Cochylimorpha langeana (Kalchberg, 1898)
- Cochylimorpha lungtangensis (Razowski, 1964)
- Cochylimorpha maleropa (Meyrick in Caradja & Meyrick, 1937)
- Cochylimorpha meridiana (Staudinger, 1859)
- Cochylimorpha meridiolana (Ragonot, 1894)
- Cochylimorpha mongolicana (Ragonot, 1894)
- Cochylimorpha monstrabilis (Razowski, 1970)
- Cochylimorpha montana (Razowski, 1967)
- Cochylimorpha moriutii (Kawabe, 1987)
- Cochylimorpha nankinensis (Razowski, 1964)
- Cochylimorpha nipponana (Razowski, 1977)
- Cochylimorpha nodulana (Moschler, 1862)
- Cochylimorpha nomadana (Erschoff, 1874)
- Cochylimorpha nuristana (Razowski, 1967)
- Cochylimorpha obliquana (Eversmann, 1844)
- Cochylimorpha perfusana (Guenee, 1845)
- Cochylimorpha perturbatana (Kennel, 1900)
- Cochylimorpha peucedana (Ragonot, 1889)
- Cochylimorpha pirizanica (Razowski, 1963)
- Cochylimorpha psalmophanes (Meyrick, 1925)
- Cochylimorpha pseudoalternana (Chambon & Khous, 1993)
- Cochylimorpha pyramidana (Staudinger, 1871)
- Cochylimorpha razowskiana Kuznetzov, 2005
- Cochylimorpha salinarida Groenen & Larsen, 2003
- Cochylimorpha santolinana (Staudinger, 1871)
- Cochylimorpha scoptes (Razowski, 1984)
- Cochylimorpha scrophulana (Razowski, 1963)
- Cochylimorpha simplicis (Bai Guo & Guo, 1996)
- Cochylimorpha simulata (Razowski, 1970)
- Cochylimorpha sparsana (Staudinger, 1880)
- Cochylimorpha stataria (Razowski, 1970)
- Cochylimorpha straminea (Haworth, [1811])
- Cochylimorpha subwoliniana (Danilevsky, in Danilevsky, Kuznetsov & Falkovitsh, 1962)
- Cochylimorpha tamerlana (Ragonot, 1894)
- Cochylimorpha thomasi Karisch, 2003
- Cochylimorpha tiraculana (Bassi & Scaramozzino, 1989)
- Cochylimorpha triangulifera (Kuznetzov, 1966)
- Cochylimorpha wiltshirei (Razowski, 1963)
- Cochylimorpha woliniana (Schleich, 1868)
- Cochylimorpha yangtseana Razowski, 2006

=== Synonyms ===
- Atroposta Pogue, 1990, in Pogue & Mickevich, Cladistics 6: 322. [nomen nudum]
- Bipenisia Razowski, 1960, Polskie Pismo Ent. 30: 30:. Type species: Cochylis jucundana Treitschke, 1835. [subgenus of Stenodes]
- Bleszynskiella Razowski, 1960, Polskie Pismo Ent. 30: 30:. Type species: Orthotaenia alternana Curtis, 1831. [subgenus of Euxanthoides]
- Cagiva Pogue, 1990, in Pogue & Mickevich, Cladistics 6: 322. [nomen nudum]
- Cybilla Pogue, 1990, in Pogue & Mickevich, Cladistics 6: 322. [nomen nudum]
- Eustenodes Razowski, 1960, Polskie Pismo Ent. 30: 30:. Type species: Euxanthis dorsimaculana Preissecker, 1908. [subgenus of Stenodes]
- Euxanthoides Razowski, 1960, Polskie Pismo Ent. 30: 30:. Type species: Tortrix straminea Haworth, [1811].
- Honca Pogue, 1990, in Pogue & Mickevich, Cladistics 6: 322. [nomen nudum]
- Nycthia Pogue, 1990, in Pogue & Mickevich, Cladistics 6: 322. [nomen nudum]
- Parastenodes Razowski, 1960, Polskie Pismo Ent. 30: 30:. Type species: Cochylis meridiana Staudinger, 1859. [subgenus of Stenodes]
- Paraxanthoides Razowski, 1960, Polskie Pismo Ent. 30: 30:. Type species: Tortrix (Cochylis) chamomillana Herrich-Schäffer, 1851. [subgenus of Euxanthoides]
- Poterioparvus Pogue, 1990, in Pogue & Mickevich, Cladistics 6: 322. [nomen nudum]
- Stenodes Guenée, 1845, Annals Soc. ent. Fr 2(3): 298. Type species: Cochylis elongana Fischer von Röslerstamm, 1839. [preoccupied]
- Substenodes Razowski, 1960, Polskie Pismo Ent. 30: 30:. Type species: Cochylis pontana Staudinger, 1859. [subgenus of Stenodes]

== See also ==
- List of Tortricidae genera
