= Aethes perfidana =

Scientific classification
- Domain: Eukaryota
- Kingdom: Animalia
- Phylum: Arthropoda
- Class: Insecta
- Order: Lepidoptera
- Family: Tortricidae
- Genus: Aethes
- Species: A. perfidana

Binomial name
- Aethes perfidana (Kennel, 1900)

Synonyms
- Conchylis perfidana Kennel, 1901

Species of moth

Aethes perfidana is a species of moth of the family Tortricidae. It was described by Kennel in 1901. It is endemic to Spain.

The wingspan is 13–15 millimetres (0.51–0.59 in). Adults are on wing in June.

The larvae feed on Santolina species.
