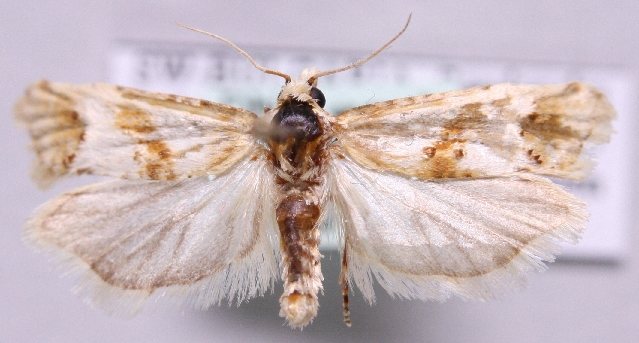

Scientific classification
- Kingdom: Animalia
- Phylum: Arthropoda
- Clade: Pancrustacea
- Class: Insecta
- Order: Lepidoptera
- Family: Tortricidae
- Genus: Cochylimorpha
- Species: C. alternana

Binomial name
- Cochylimorpha alternana (Stephens, 1834)

Synonyms
- Orthotaenia alternana Curtis, 1831; Euxanthis cinnamomella Turati & Krger, 1936; Cochylis gigantana Doubleday, 1850; Euxanthis moscovana Kennel, 1913

= Cochylimorpha alternana =

Species of moth

Cochylimorpha alternana is a moth from the family Tortricidae. It is found from France and Great Britain east to the Ural Mountains and Asia Minor. It is also present in North Africa (Libya) and Iran.

The wingspan is 20–24 mm. There are two generations per year with adults on wing in May and June and again in August.

The larvae feed on the flower buds and developing florets of Centaurea scabiosa.
