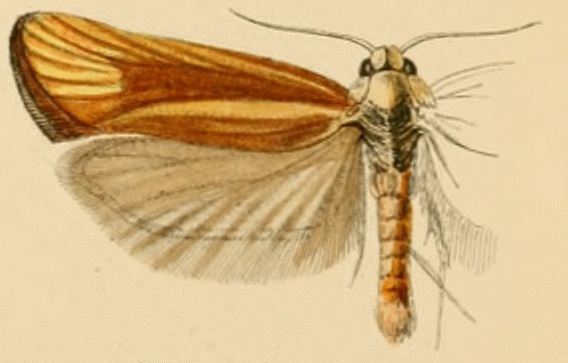

Scientific classification
- Kingdom: Animalia
- Phylum: Arthropoda
- Clade: Pancrustacea
- Class: Insecta
- Order: Lepidoptera
- Family: Tortricidae
- Genus: Cochylimorpha
- Species: C. fucatana

Binomial name
- Cochylimorpha fucatana (Snellen, 1883)

Synonyms
- Conchylis fucatana Snellen, 1883

= Cochylimorpha fucatana =

Species of moth

Cochylimorpha fucatana is a species of moth of the family Tortricidae. It is found in Romania, Russia (Amur, Urals, Minussinsk), Turkmenistan and Mongolia.

The wingspan is 17–21 mm. Adults have been recorded on wing from June to July.
