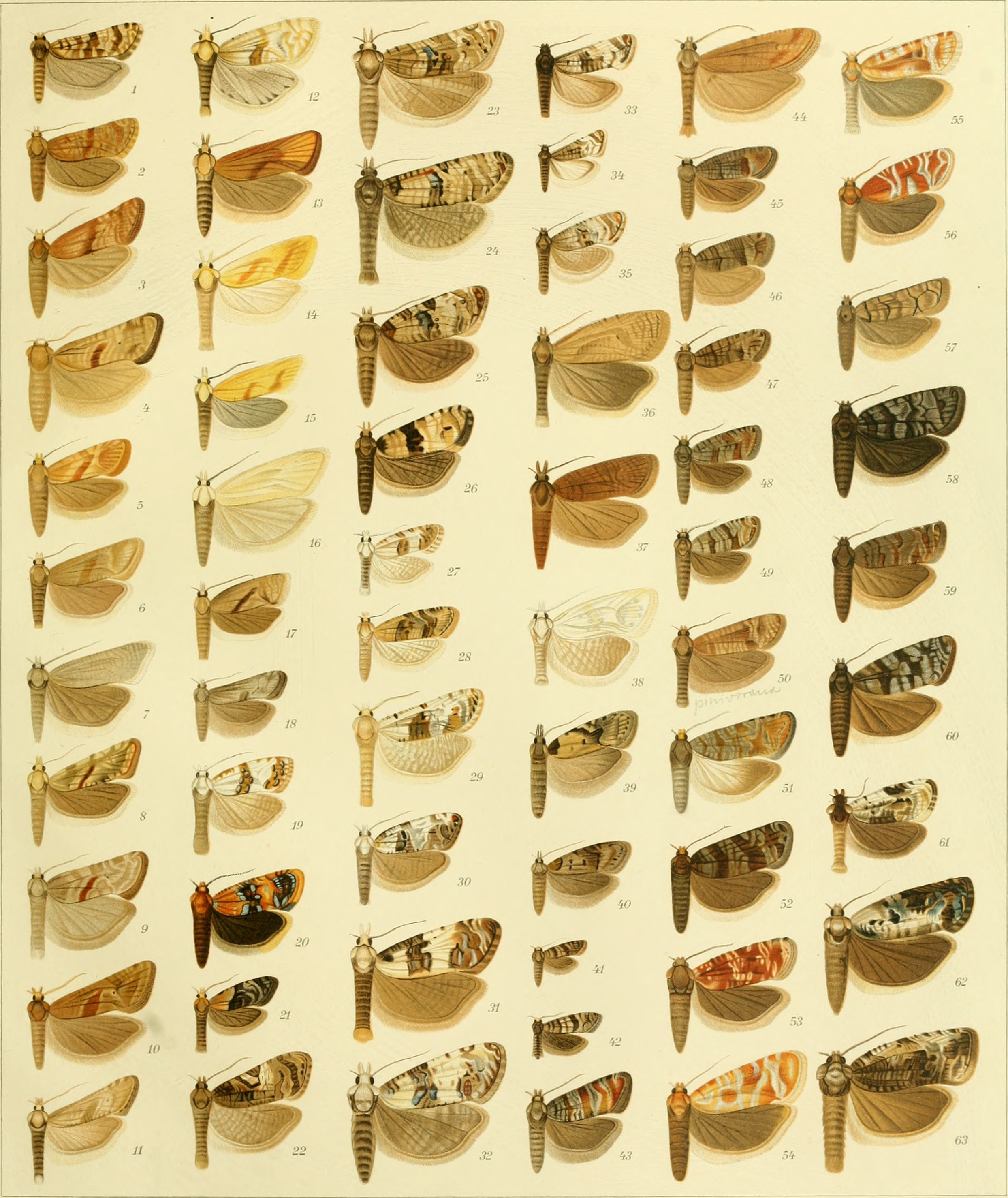
- Cochylimorpha hilarana in Kennel Die palaearktischen tortriciden figures 3 female, 4 also female

Scientific classification
- Kingdom: Animalia
- Phylum: Arthropoda
- Clade: Pancrustacea
- Class: Insecta
- Order: Lepidoptera
- Family: Tortricidae
- Genus: Cochylimorpha
- Species: C. hilarana

Binomial name
- Cochylimorpha hilarana (Herrich-Schäffer, 1851)

Synonyms
- Tortrix (Cochylis) hilarana Herrich-Schäffer, 1851; Euxanthis hilarana var. dilutana Caradja, 1916; hilarana Herrich-Schaffer, 1847; Conchylis rheticana Laharpe, 1864

= Cochylimorpha hilarana =

Species of moth

Cochylimorpha hilarana is a species of moth of the family Tortricidae. It is found in most of Europe and Asia Minor. The wingspan is 17–23 mm. Adults have been recorded from wing from July to August.

The larvae feed on Artemisia campestris and possibly Artemisia maritima. They can be found in June and July.
