= Cochylimorpha wiltshirei =

Scientific classification
- Kingdom: Animalia
- Phylum: Arthropoda
- Clade: Pancrustacea
- Class: Insecta
- Order: Lepidoptera
- Family: Tortricidae
- Genus: Cochylimorpha
- Species: C. wiltshirei

Binomial name
- Cochylimorpha wiltshirei (Razowski, 1963)

Synonyms
- Stenodes wiltshirei Razowski, 1963

Species of moth

Cochylimorpha wiltshirei is a species of moth of the family Tortricidae. It is found in Iran (Kulikosh and Karaj).
