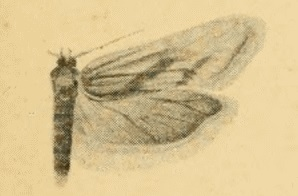

Scientific classification
- Domain: Eukaryota
- Kingdom: Animalia
- Phylum: Arthropoda
- Class: Insecta
- Order: Lepidoptera
- Family: Tortricidae
- Genus: Aethes
- Species: A. prangana

Binomial name
- Aethes prangana (Kennel, 1900)

Synonyms
- Conchylis prangana Kennel, 1900

= Aethes prangana =

Species of moth

Aethes prangana is a species of moth from the family Tortricidae. It was described by Kennel in 1900. It is found in the southern Urals and Caucasus of Russia, Asia Minor, Armenia and northern Iran.

The wingspan is 20–23 millimetres (0.79–0.91 in). Adults are on wing in April and June.
