= Cochylimorpha simulata =

Scientific classification
- Kingdom: Animalia
- Phylum: Arthropoda
- Clade: Pancrustacea
- Class: Insecta
- Order: Lepidoptera
- Family: Tortricidae
- Genus: Cochylimorpha
- Species: C. simulata

Binomial name
- Cochylimorpha simulata (Razowski, 1970)

Synonyms
- Stenodes simulata Razowski, 1970

Species of moth

Cochylimorpha simulata is a species of moth of the family Tortricidae. It is found in Iran (Shahkuh, Elburz region).
