= Cochylimorpha armeniana =

Scientific classification
- Domain: Eukaryota
- Kingdom: Animalia
- Phylum: Arthropoda
- Class: Insecta
- Order: Lepidoptera
- Family: Tortricidae
- Genus: Cochylimorpha
- Species: C. armeniana

Binomial name
- Cochylimorpha armeniana (de Joannis, 1891)

Synonyms
- Euxanthis armeniana de Joannis, 1891

Species of moth

Cochylimorpha armeniana is a species of moth of the family Tortricidae. It is found in Asia Minor (Kayseri), Afghanistan (Pamir) and Iran.
