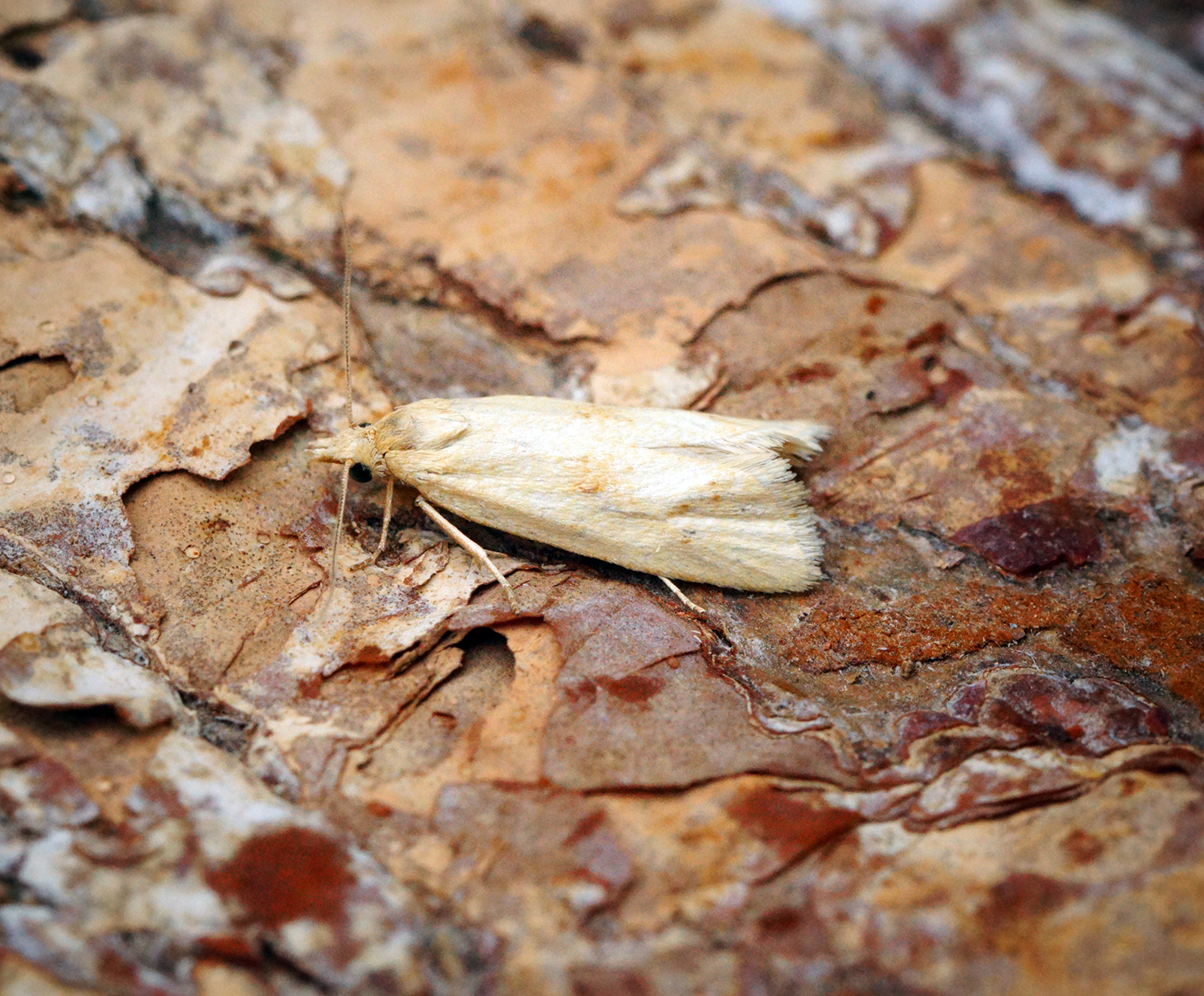

Scientific classification
- Kingdom: Animalia
- Phylum: Arthropoda
- Clade: Pancrustacea
- Class: Insecta
- Order: Lepidoptera
- Family: Tortricidae
- Genus: Cochylimorpha
- Species: C. meridiana

Binomial name
- Cochylimorpha meridiana (Staudinger, 1859)

Synonyms
- Cochylis meridiana Staudinger, 1859; Conchylis claviculana Mann, 1861; Conchylis frauenfeldi Mann, 1871; Conchylis naeviferana Kennel, 1899; Euxanthis priscillana Kennel, 1919

= Cochylimorpha meridiana =

Species of moth

Cochylimorpha meridiana is a species of moth of the family Tortricidae. It is found in France, Spain, Portugal, Switzerland, Italy, Albania, North Macedonia, Greece, Bulgaria, Romania, Ukraine, Russia (Sarepta, Ural, the Caucasus) and Asia Minor.

The wingspan is 19–25 mm. Adults have been recorded on wing from April to September.
