= Cochylimorpha kurdistana =

Scientific classification
- Kingdom: Animalia
- Phylum: Arthropoda
- Clade: Pancrustacea
- Class: Insecta
- Order: Lepidoptera
- Family: Tortricidae
- Genus: Cochylimorpha
- Species: C. kurdistana

Binomial name
- Cochylimorpha kurdistana (Amsel, 1959)

Synonyms
- Euxanthis kurdistana Amsel, 1959

Species of moth

Cochylimorpha kurdistana is a species of moth of the family Tortricidae. It is found in Iraq, Syria and Iran.

The wingspan is 21–26 mm.
