= Cochylimorpha fuscimacula =

Scientific classification
- Kingdom: Animalia
- Phylum: Arthropoda
- Clade: Pancrustacea
- Class: Insecta
- Order: Lepidoptera
- Family: Tortricidae
- Genus: Cochylimorpha
- Species: C. fuscimacula

Binomial name
- Cochylimorpha fuscimacula (Falkovitsh, 1963)

Synonyms
- Stenodes fuscimacula Falkovitsh, 1963

Species of moth

Cochylimorpha fuscimacula is a species of moth of the family Tortricidae. It is found in China (Shaanxi, Xinjiang) and Russia.

The wingspan is 11–16 mm. Adults have been recorded on wing in July.
