= Cochylimorpha psalmophanes =

Scientific classification
- Kingdom: Animalia
- Phylum: Arthropoda
- Clade: Pancrustacea
- Class: Insecta
- Order: Lepidoptera
- Family: Tortricidae
- Genus: Cochylimorpha
- Species: C. psalmophanes

Binomial name
- Cochylimorpha psalmophanes (Meyrick, 1925)

Synonyms
- Euxanthis psalmophanes Meyrick, 1925

Species of moth

Cochylimorpha psalmophanes is a species of moth of the family Tortricidae. It is found in Egypt.

The larvae feed on Artemisia judaica.
