= Cochylimorpha jaculana =

Scientific classification
- Kingdom: Animalia
- Phylum: Arthropoda
- Class: Insecta
- Order: Lepidoptera
- Family: Tortricidae
- Genus: Cochylimorpha
- Species: C. jaculana

Binomial name
- Cochylimorpha jaculana (Snellen, 1883)

Synonyms
- Conchylis jaculana Snellen, 1883

Species of moth

Cochylimorpha jaculana is a species of moth of the family Tortricidae. It is found in China (Anhui, Beijing, Hebei, Heilongjiang, Inner Mongolia, Jilin, Ningxia, Shaanxi, Shandong, Shanxi, Sichuan, Tianjin, Yunnan), Japan, Korea and Mongolia.
