= Cochylimorpha ignicolorana =

Scientific classification
- Kingdom: Animalia
- Phylum: Arthropoda
- Clade: Pancrustacea
- Class: Insecta
- Order: Lepidoptera
- Family: Tortricidae
- Genus: Cochylimorpha
- Species: C. ignicolorana

Binomial name
- Cochylimorpha ignicolorana Junnilainen & Nupponen, in Nupponen, Junnilainen, Nupponen & Olschwag, 2001

Species of moth

Cochylimorpha ignicolorana is a species of moth of the family Tortricidae. It is found in Russia (the southern Urals).

The wingspan is 11–15 millimetres (0.43–0.59 in). Adults have been recorded from wing from June to July.
