= Cochylimorpha nuristana =

Scientific classification
- Kingdom: Animalia
- Phylum: Arthropoda
- Clade: Pancrustacea
- Class: Insecta
- Order: Lepidoptera
- Family: Tortricidae
- Genus: Cochylimorpha
- Species: C. nuristana

Binomial name
- Cochylimorpha nuristana (Razowski, 1967)

Synonyms
- Stenodes nuristana Razowski, 1967

Species of moth

Cochylimorpha nuristana is a species of moth of the family Tortricidae. It is found in Afghanistan and Iran.

The wingspan is 19–25 mm.
