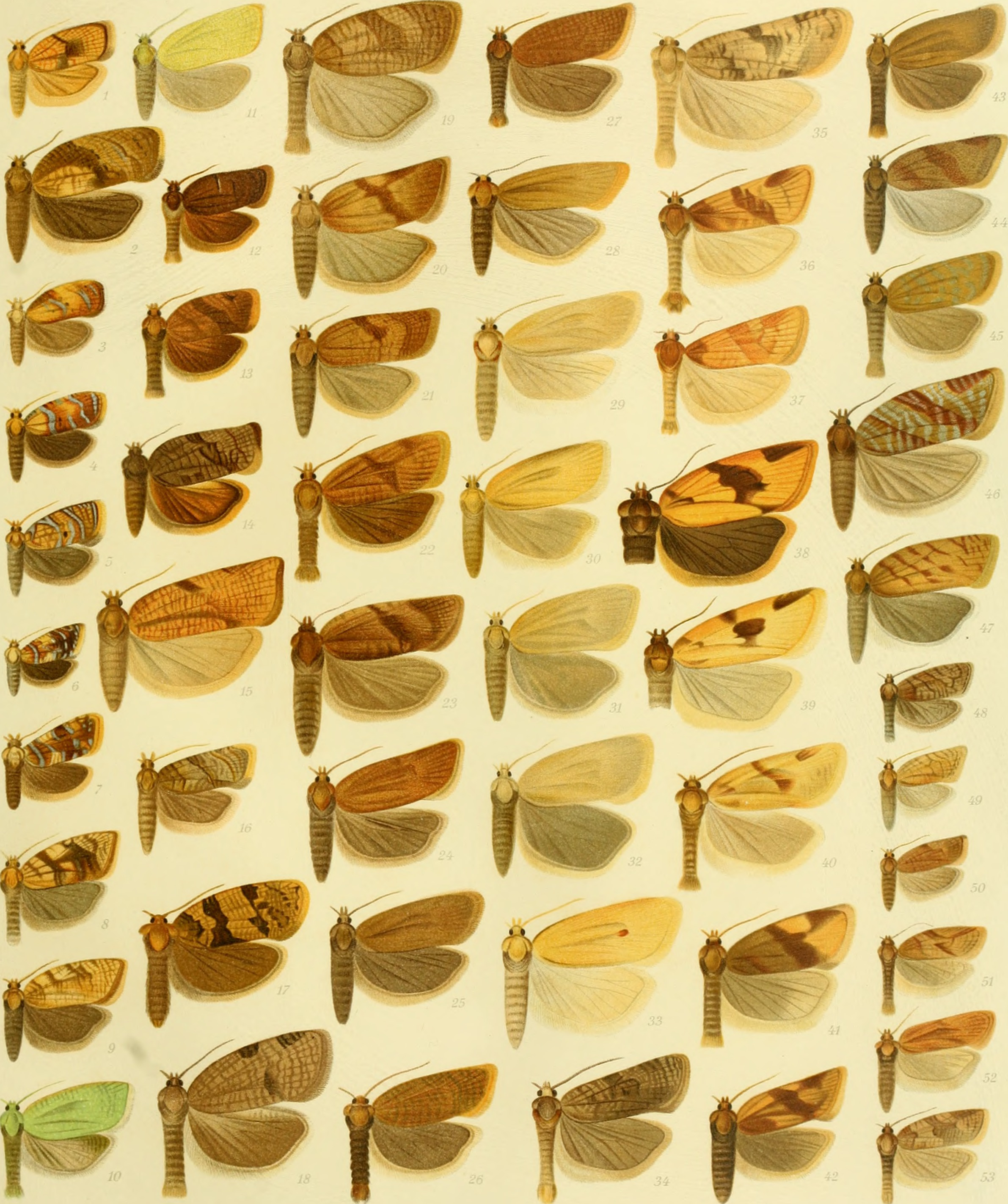
- Acleris aurichalcana in Kennel Die palaearktischen tortriciden figure 2 female

Scientific classification
- Domain: Eukaryota
- Kingdom: Animalia
- Phylum: Arthropoda
- Class: Insecta
- Order: Lepidoptera
- Family: Tortricidae
- Genus: Acleris
- Species: A. aurichalcana

Binomial name
- Acleris aurichalcana (Bremer, 1865)

Synonyms
- Lozotaenia aurichalcana Bremer, 1865; Croesia aurichalcana; Tortrix aurichalcana var. auristellana Caradja, 1916; Tortrix aurichalcana f. isshikii Matsumura, 1931

= Acleris aurichalcana =

Species of moth

Acleris aurichalcana is a species of moth of the family Tortricidae. It is found in South Korea, China (Shaanxi), Japan and Russia (Amur).

The wingspan is about 20 mm.

The larvae feed on Tilia japonica, Tilia tuan, Tilia amurensis, Tilia maximowitziana and Lespedeza bicolor.
