= Cochylimorpha monstrabilis =

Scientific classification
- Kingdom: Animalia
- Phylum: Arthropoda
- Clade: Pancrustacea
- Class: Insecta
- Order: Lepidoptera
- Family: Tortricidae
- Genus: Cochylimorpha
- Species: C. monstrabilis

Binomial name
- Cochylimorpha monstrabilis (Razowski, 1970)

Synonyms
- Stenodes monstrabilis Razowski, 1970

Species of moth

Cochylimorpha monstrabilis is a species of moth of the family Tortricidae. It is found in Mongolia.

Its specific name monstrābilis means 'remarkable, noteworthy', from the Latin mōnstrāre, 'to show' and -ābilis, 'worthy of'.
