= Cochylimorpha discopunctana =

Scientific classification
- Kingdom: Animalia
- Phylum: Arthropoda
- Clade: Pancrustacea
- Class: Insecta
- Order: Lepidoptera
- Family: Tortricidae
- Genus: Cochylimorpha
- Species: C. discopunctana

Binomial name
- Cochylimorpha discopunctana (Eversmann, 1844)

Synonyms
- Cochylis discopunctana Eversmann, 1844; Conchylis coagulana Christoph, 1872; Conchylis incretana Lederer, 1857; Conchylis punctiferana Ragonot, 1881

Species of moth

Cochylimorpha discopunctana is a species of moth of the family Tortricidae. It is found in Portugal, Spain, Romania, Russia (Kasan, Spassk, Sarepta, Uralsk), Mongolia and Transcaspia.

The wingspan is 13–17 mm. Adults have been recorded on wing from July to September.
