= Cochylimorpha agenjoi =

Scientific classification
- Kingdom: Animalia
- Phylum: Arthropoda
- Clade: Pancrustacea
- Class: Insecta
- Order: Lepidoptera
- Family: Tortricidae
- Genus: Cochylimorpha
- Species: C. agenjoi

Binomial name
- Cochylimorpha agenjoi (Razowski, 1963)

Synonyms
- Stenodes agenjoi Razowski, 1963

Species of moth

Cochylimorpha agenjoi is a species of moth of the family Tortricidae. It is found in Spain.

The wingspan is about 16 mm. Adults have been recorded on wing in July.
