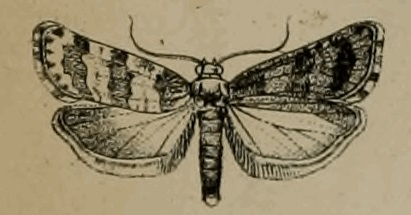

Scientific classification
- Kingdom: Animalia
- Phylum: Arthropoda
- Clade: Pancrustacea
- Class: Insecta
- Order: Lepidoptera
- Family: Tortricidae
- Genus: Cochylimorpha
- Species: C. cultana

Binomial name
- Cochylimorpha cultana (Lederer, 1855)

Synonyms
- Cochylis cultana Lederer, 1855; Conchylis aedeamana Razowski, 1961; Conchylis aedemana Razowski, 1961; Euxanthis hilarana var. albidana Caradja, 1916; Conchylis assalana Chretien, 1915; Euxanthis bigenerana Kennel, 1901; Cochylis extensana Staudinger, 1859; Cochylis lambessana Baker, 1888; Cochylis oedemana Constant, 1894; Cochylis pontana Staudinger, 1859; Euxanthis symmerista Meyrick, in Caradja & Meyrick, 1935

= Cochylimorpha cultana =

Species of moth

Cochylimorpha cultana is a species of moth of the family Tortricidae. It is found in China (Gansu, Jilin, Ningxia, Qinghai, Shaanxi, Shandong, Shanxi), Russia and Europe (Portugal, Spain, France, Bulgaria and Romania).

The wingspan is 13–17 mm. Adults are on wing from May to June.

The larvae feed on Artemisia campestris.
