= Cochylimorpha yangtseana =

Scientific classification
- Kingdom: Animalia
- Phylum: Arthropoda
- Class: Insecta
- Order: Lepidoptera
- Family: Tortricidae
- Genus: Cochylimorpha
- Species: C. yangtseana

Binomial name
- Cochylimorpha yangtseana Razowski, 2006

Species of moth

Cochylimorpha yangtseana is a species of moth of the family Tortricidae. It is found in Tibet, China.

The wingspan is about 18 mm.
