= Cochylimorpha nipponana =

Scientific classification
- Kingdom: Animalia
- Phylum: Arthropoda
- Clade: Pancrustacea
- Class: Insecta
- Order: Lepidoptera
- Family: Tortricidae
- Genus: Cochylimorpha
- Species: C. nipponana

Binomial name
- Cochylimorpha nipponana (Razowski, 1977)

Synonyms
- Stenodes nipponana Razowski, 1977

Species of moth

Cochylimorpha nipponana is a species of moth of the family Tortricidae. It is found in China (Heilongjiang, Shaanxi) and Japan.
