= Cochylimorpha fucosa =

Scientific classification
- Kingdom: Animalia
- Phylum: Arthropoda
- Clade: Pancrustacea
- Class: Insecta
- Order: Lepidoptera
- Family: Tortricidae
- Genus: Cochylimorpha
- Species: C. fucosa

Binomial name
- Cochylimorpha fucosa (Razowski, 1970)

Synonyms
- Stenodes fucosa Razowski, 1970

Species of moth

Cochylimorpha fucosa is a species of moth of the family Tortricidae. It is found in Italy, Romania, Turkey and Iran.

The wingspan is 21–25 mm. Adults have been recorded on wing from June to July.
