= Cochylimorpha erlebachi =

Scientific classification
- Kingdom: Animalia
- Phylum: Arthropoda
- Clade: Pancrustacea
- Class: Insecta
- Order: Lepidoptera
- Family: Tortricidae
- Genus: Cochylimorpha
- Species: C. erlebachi

Binomial name
- Cochylimorpha erlebachi Huemer & Trematerra, 1997

Species of moth

Cochylimorpha erlebachi is a species of moth of the family Tortricidae. It is found in the Alps of France and Italy.
