= Cochylimorpha amabilis =

Scientific classification
- Kingdom: Animalia
- Phylum: Arthropoda
- Clade: Pancrustacea
- Class: Insecta
- Order: Lepidoptera
- Family: Tortricidae
- Genus: Cochylimorpha
- Species: C. amabilis

Binomial name
- Cochylimorpha amabilis (Meyrick, in Caradja, 1931)

Synonyms
- Euxanthis amabilis Meyrick, in Caradja, 1931

Species of moth

Cochylimorpha amabilis is a species of moth of the family Tortricidae. It is found in China (Xizang) and Japan.
