= Cochylimorpha scoptes =

Scientific classification
- Kingdom: Animalia
- Phylum: Arthropoda
- Clade: Pancrustacea
- Class: Insecta
- Order: Lepidoptera
- Family: Tortricidae
- Genus: Cochylimorpha
- Species: C. scoptes

Binomial name
- Cochylimorpha scoptes (Razowski, 1984)

Synonyms
- Stenodes scoptes Razowski, 1984

Species of moth

Cochylimorpha scoptes is a species of moth of the family Tortricidae. It is found in Kashmir.
