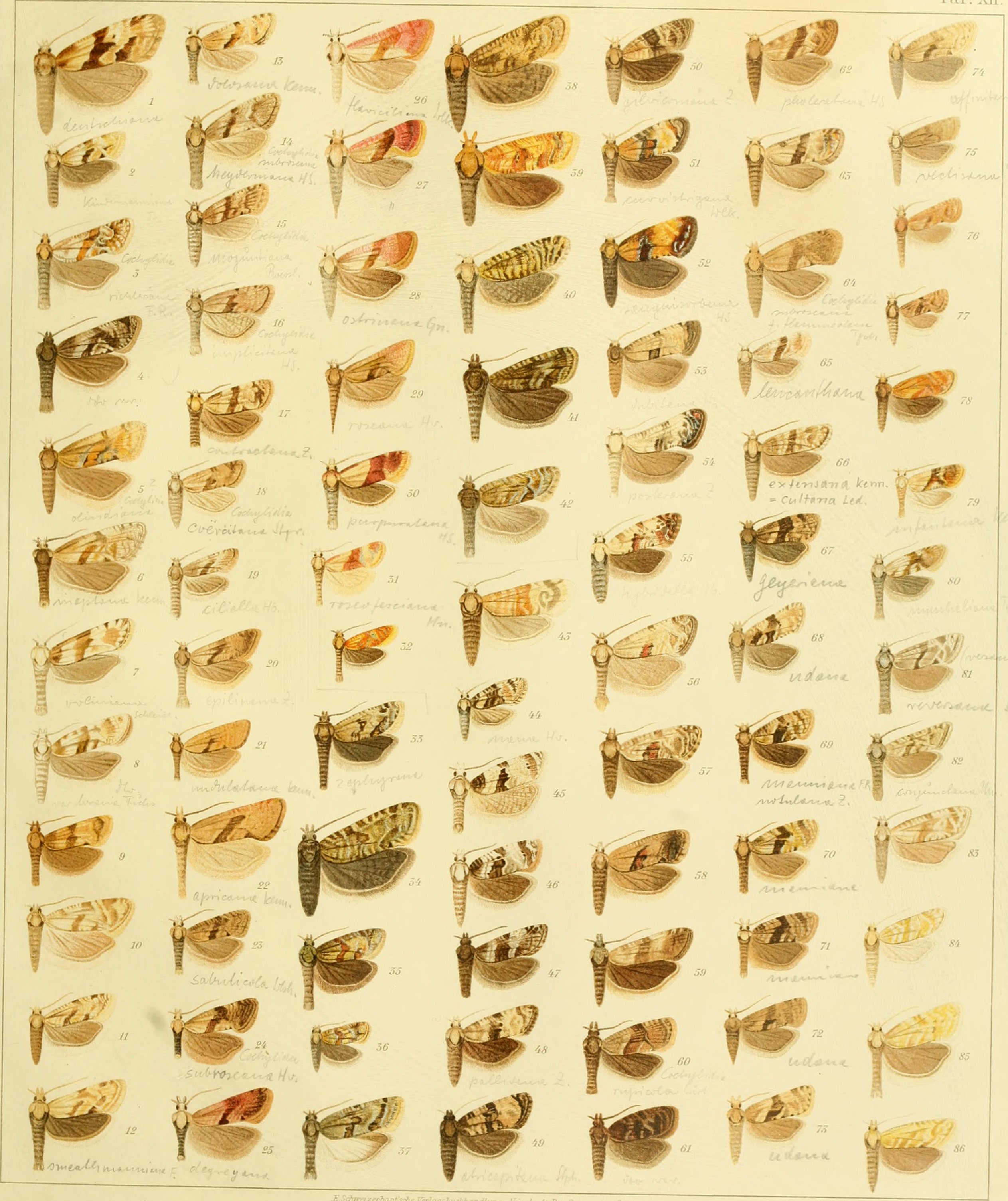
- In Julius von Kennel's Die palaearktischen tortriciden figures 10, 81, 84

Scientific classification
- Domain: Eukaryota
- Kingdom: Animalia
- Phylum: Arthropoda
- Class: Insecta
- Order: Lepidoptera
- Family: Tortricidae
- Genus: Aethes
- Species: A. languidana

Binomial name
- Aethes languidana (J. J. Mann, 1855)

Synonyms
- Cochylis languidana J. J. Mann, 1855; Conchylis incommodana Kennel, 1901; Cochylis reversana Staudinger, 1859; Phalonia versana Walsingham, 1908

= Aethes languidana =

Species of moth

Aethes languidana is a species of moth of the family Tortricidae. It was described by Josef Johann Mann in 1855. It is found in France, Spain, Portugal and Italy and on Corsica and Sardinia.

The wingspan is 11–15 millimetres (0.43–0.59 in). Adults are on wing in March and from May to July.

The larvae feed on Helichrysum (including Helichrysum arenarium) and Phagnalon species.
