= Cochylimorpha montana =

Scientific classification
- Kingdom: Animalia
- Phylum: Arthropoda
- Clade: Pancrustacea
- Class: Insecta
- Order: Lepidoptera
- Family: Tortricidae
- Genus: Cochylimorpha
- Species: C. montana

Binomial name
- Cochylimorpha montana (Razowski, 1967)

Synonyms
- Stenodes montana Razowski, 1967

Species of moth

Cochylimorpha montana is a species of moth of the family Tortricidae. It is found in north-eastern Afghanistan and Iran.

The wingspan is 20.5–24.5 mm.
