= Cochylimorpha chionella =

Scientific classification
- Kingdom: Animalia
- Phylum: Arthropoda
- Clade: Pancrustacea
- Class: Insecta
- Order: Lepidoptera
- Family: Tortricidae
- Genus: Cochylimorpha
- Species: C. chionella

Binomial name
- Cochylimorpha chionella (Schawerda, 1924)

Synonyms
- Conchylis chionella Schawerda, 1924

Species of moth

Cochylimorpha chionella is a species of moth of the family Tortricidae. It is found in Iraq.
