= Cochylimorpha triangulifera =

Scientific classification
- Kingdom: Animalia
- Phylum: Arthropoda
- Clade: Pancrustacea
- Class: Insecta
- Order: Lepidoptera
- Family: Tortricidae
- Genus: Cochylimorpha
- Species: C. triangulifera

Binomial name
- Cochylimorpha triangulifera (Kuznetzov, 1966)

Synonyms
- Stenodes triangulifera Kuznetzov, 1966

Species of moth

Cochylimorpha triangulifera is a species of moth of the family Tortricidae. It is found in the Russian Far East (Ussuri).
