= Cochylimorpha exoterica =

Scientific classification
- Kingdom: Animalia
- Phylum: Arthropoda
- Class: Insecta
- Order: Lepidoptera
- Family: Tortricidae
- Genus: Cochylimorpha
- Species: C. exoterica

Binomial name
- Cochylimorpha exoterica (Meyrick, 1924)

Synonyms
- Euxanthis exoterica Meyrick, 1924

Species of moth

Cochylimorpha exoterica is a species of moth of the family Tortricidae. It is found in Kenya, Rwanda and Tanzania.

The wingspan is 20–26.5 mm.
