= Cochylimorpha isocornutana =

Scientific classification
- Kingdom: Animalia
- Phylum: Arthropoda
- Clade: Pancrustacea
- Class: Insecta
- Order: Lepidoptera
- Family: Tortricidae
- Genus: Cochylimorpha
- Species: C. isocornutana

Binomial name
- Cochylimorpha isocornutana (Razowski, 1964)

Synonyms
- Stenodes isocornutana Razowski, 1964

Species of moth

Cochylimorpha isocornutana is a species of moth of the family Tortricidae. It is found in Yunnan, China.
