= Cochylimorpha lungtangensis =

Scientific classification
- Kingdom: Animalia
- Phylum: Arthropoda
- Clade: Pancrustacea
- Class: Insecta
- Order: Lepidoptera
- Family: Tortricidae
- Genus: Cochylimorpha
- Species: C. lungtangensis

Binomial name
- Cochylimorpha lungtangensis (Razowski, 1964)

Synonyms
- Stenodes lungtangensis Razowski, 1964

Species of moth

Cochylimorpha lungtangensis is a species of moth of the family Tortricidae. It is found in China (Gansu, Guizhou, Hebei, Henan, Jiangsu, Liaoning, Ningxia, Qinghai, Shaanxi, Shanxi, Sichuan, Tianjin).
