= Cochylimorpha razowskiana =

Scientific classification
- Domain: Eukaryota
- Kingdom: Animalia
- Phylum: Arthropoda
- Class: Insecta
- Order: Lepidoptera
- Family: Tortricidae
- Genus: Cochylimorpha
- Species: C. razowskiana

Binomial name
- Cochylimorpha razowskiana Kuznetzov, 2005

Species of moth

Cochylimorpha razowskiana is a species of moth of the family Tortricidae. It is found in China (Beijing, Gansu, Hebei, Henan, Ningxia, Qinghai, Shanxi, Shaanxi) and Russia.
