= Cochylimorpha moriutii =

Scientific classification
- Kingdom: Animalia
- Phylum: Arthropoda
- Clade: Pancrustacea
- Class: Insecta
- Order: Lepidoptera
- Family: Tortricidae
- Genus: Cochylimorpha
- Species: C. moriutii

Binomial name
- Cochylimorpha moriutii (Kawabe, 1987)

Synonyms
- Stenodes moriutii Kawabe, 1987

Species of moth

Cochylimorpha moriutii is a species of moth of the family Tortricidae. It is found in Thailand.
