= Cochylimorpha fluens =

Scientific classification
- Kingdom: Animalia
- Phylum: Arthropoda
- Clade: Pancrustacea
- Class: Insecta
- Order: Lepidoptera
- Family: Tortricidae
- Genus: Cochylimorpha
- Species: C. fluens

Binomial name
- Cochylimorpha fluens (Razowski, 1970)

Synonyms
- Stenodes fluens Razowski, 1970

Species of moth

Cochylimorpha fluens is a species of moth of the family Tortricidae. It is found in Afghanistan and north-eastern Iran.

The wingspan is 23–27 mm.
