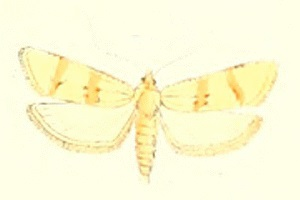

Scientific classification
- Kingdom: Animalia
- Phylum: Arthropoda
- Clade: Pancrustacea
- Class: Insecta
- Order: Lepidoptera
- Family: Tortricidae
- Genus: Cochylimorpha
- Species: C. nomadana

Binomial name
- Cochylimorpha nomadana (Erschoff, 1874)

Synonyms
- Conchylis nomadana Erschoff, 1874

= Cochylimorpha nomadana =

Species of moth

Cochylimorpha nomadana is a species of moth of the family Tortricidae. It is found in China (Xinjiang), Afghanistan, Iran, Russia (the Caucasus and south-eastern part of European Russia), Armenia, Kazakhstan, Turkmenistan and Uzbekistan.

The wingspan is 22–31 mm. Adults have been recorded from wing from July to August.
