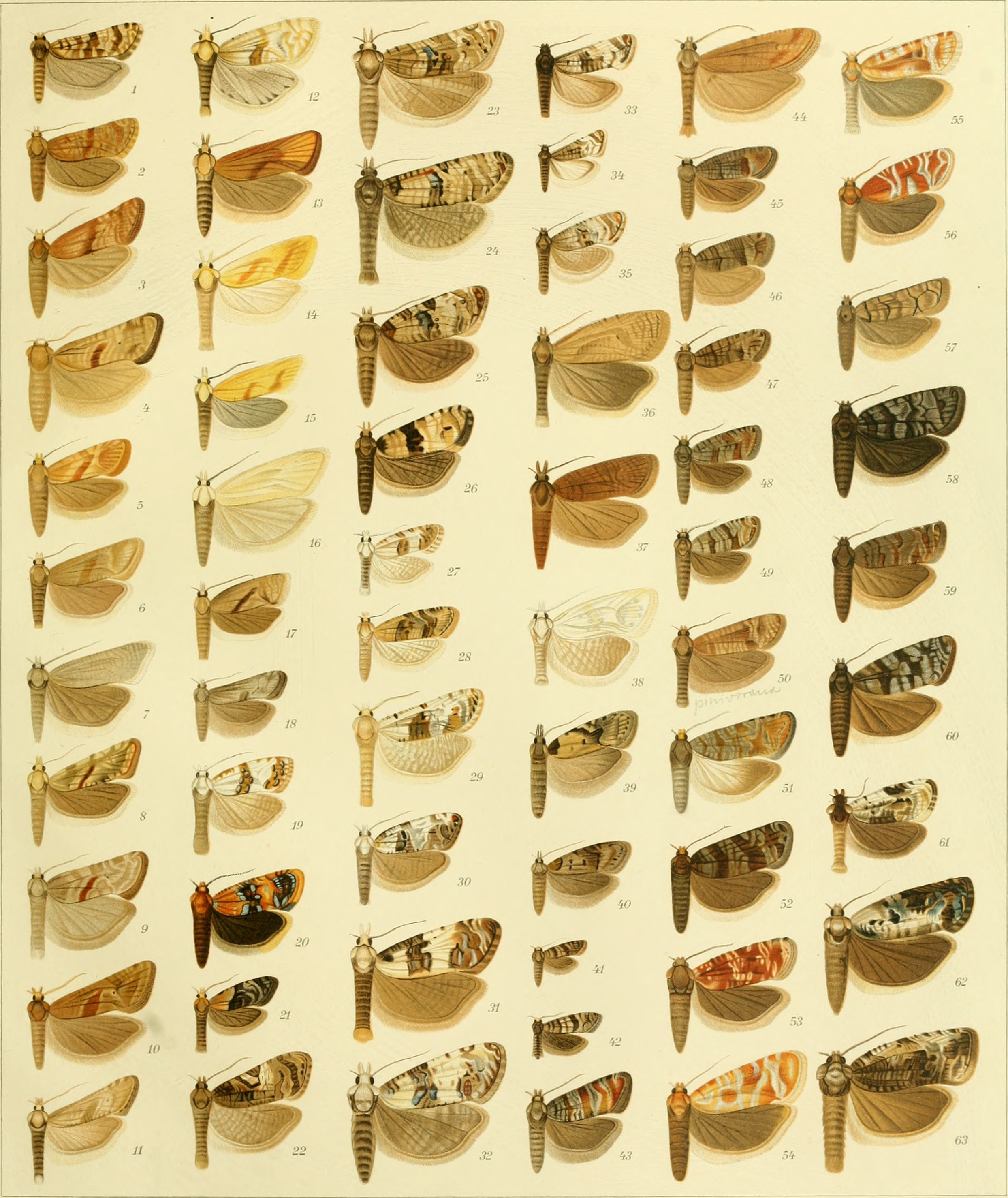
- Cochylimorpha sparsana in Kennel Die palaearktischen tortriciden figure 7

Scientific classification
- Kingdom: Animalia
- Phylum: Arthropoda
- Clade: Pancrustacea
- Class: Insecta
- Order: Lepidoptera
- Family: Tortricidae
- Genus: Cochylimorpha
- Species: C. sparsana

Binomial name
- Cochylimorpha sparsana (Staudinger, 1880)

Synonyms
- Cochylis sparsana Staudinger, 1880

= Cochylimorpha sparsana =

Species of moth

Cochylimorpha sparsana is a species of moth of the family Tortricidae. It is found in Spain, Italy, Ukraine and Asia Minor.

The wingspan is 17–19 mm. Adults have been recorded on wing in March and from May to June.
