= Cochylimorpha lagara =

Scientific classification
- Kingdom: Animalia
- Phylum: Arthropoda
- Clade: Pancrustacea
- Class: Insecta
- Order: Lepidoptera
- Family: Tortricidae
- Genus: Cochylimorpha
- Species: C. lagara

Binomial name
- Cochylimorpha lagara (Diakonoff, 1983)

Synonyms
- Stenodes lagara Diakonoff, 1983

Species of moth

Cochylimorpha lagara is a species of moth of the family Tortricidae. It is found in Saudi Arabia.
