= Cochylimorpha alticolana =

Scientific classification
- Kingdom: Animalia
- Phylum: Arthropoda
- Clade: Pancrustacea
- Class: Insecta
- Order: Lepidoptera
- Family: Tortricidae
- Genus: Cochylimorpha
- Species: C. alticolana

Binomial name
- Cochylimorpha alticolana (Razowski, 1964)

Synonyms
- Stenodes alticolana Razowski, 1964

Species of moth

Cochylimorpha alticolana is a species of moth of the family Tortricidae. It is found in Xizang, China.
