= Cochylimorpha centralasiae =

Scientific classification
- Domain: Eukaryota
- Kingdom: Animalia
- Phylum: Arthropoda
- Class: Insecta
- Order: Lepidoptera
- Family: Tortricidae
- Genus: Cochylimorpha
- Species: C. centralasiae

Binomial name
- Cochylimorpha centralasiae (Razowski, 1964)

Synonyms
- Stenodes centralasiae Razowski, 1964

Species of moth

Cochylimorpha centralasiae is a species of moth of the family Tortricidae.

It is found in Central Asia, within the Altai Krai of Russia, and Margelan of the Fergana Region in Uzbekistan.

- Data related to Cochylimorpha centralasiae at Wikispecies
