= Cochylimorpha clathrana =

Scientific classification
- Kingdom: Animalia
- Phylum: Arthropoda
- Clade: Pancrustacea
- Class: Insecta
- Order: Lepidoptera
- Family: Tortricidae
- Genus: Cochylimorpha
- Species: C. clathrana

Binomial name
- Cochylimorpha clathrana (Staudinger, 1871)

Synonyms
- Conchylis clathrana Staudinger, 1871

Species of moth

Cochylimorpha clathrana is a species of moth of the family Tortricidae. It is found in Ukraine and Russia.

The wingspan is 16–20 mm. Adults have been recorded on wing in May.
