= Cochylimorpha subwoliniana =

Scientific classification
- Kingdom: Animalia
- Phylum: Arthropoda
- Clade: Pancrustacea
- Class: Insecta
- Order: Lepidoptera
- Family: Tortricidae
- Genus: Cochylimorpha
- Species: C. subwoliniana

Binomial name
- Cochylimorpha subwoliniana (Danilevsky, in Danilevsky, Kuznetsov & Falkovitsh, 1962)

Synonyms
- Euxanthis subwoliniana Danilevsky, in Danilevsky, Kuznetsov & Falkovitsh, 1962

Species of moth

Cochylimorpha subwoliniana is a species of moth of the family Tortricidae. It is found in Romania, Russia and Central Asia (Dshungarskij Ala Tau, Zailijskij Ala Tau, Issyk, Ketman).

The wingspan is 11–14 mm. Adults have been recorded on wing from May to July.
