= Cochylimorpha kohibabae =

Scientific classification
- Domain: Eukaryota
- Kingdom: Animalia
- Phylum: Arthropoda
- Class: Insecta
- Order: Lepidoptera
- Family: Tortricidae
- Genus: Cochylimorpha
- Species: C. kohibabae

Binomial name
- Cochylimorpha kohibabae Razowski, 2005

Species of moth

Cochylimorpha kohibabae is a species of moth of the family Tortricidae. It is found in Afghanistan.
