= Cochylimorpha decolorella =

Scientific classification
- Kingdom: Animalia
- Phylum: Arthropoda
- Clade: Pancrustacea
- Class: Insecta
- Order: Lepidoptera
- Family: Tortricidae
- Genus: Cochylimorpha
- Species: C. decolorella

Binomial name
- Cochylimorpha decolorella (Zeller, 1839)

Synonyms
- Anarsia decolorella Zeller, 1839; Tortrix chamomilana Herrich-Schaffer, 1850; Tortrix (Cochylis) chamomillana Herrich-Schaffer, 1851; Cochylis decolorana Razowski, 1991; Cochylis pentactinana Mann, 1855

Species of moth

Cochylimorpha decolorella is a species of moth of the family Tortricidae. It is found on the Canary Islands and in Portugal, Spain, France, Bulgaria, as well as on Corsica, Sardinia, Sicily, Malta and Madeira. Outside of Europe, it is found in Morocco, Egypt, Turkey and the Near East.

The wingspan is 18–24 mm. Adults have been recorded on wing from January to May.
