= Cochylimorpha simplicis =

Scientific classification
- Kingdom: Animalia
- Phylum: Arthropoda
- Clade: Pancrustacea
- Class: Insecta
- Order: Lepidoptera
- Family: Tortricidae
- Genus: Cochylimorpha
- Species: C. simplicis

Binomial name
- Cochylimorpha simplicis (Bai Guo & Guo, 1996)

Synonyms
- Stenodes simplicis Bai Guo & Guo, 1996

Species of moth

Cochylimorpha simplicis is a species of moth of the family Tortricidae. It is found in Shanxi, China.
