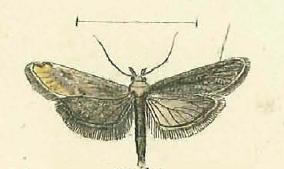

Scientific classification
- Kingdom: Animalia
- Phylum: Arthropoda
- Clade: Pancrustacea
- Class: Insecta
- Order: Lepidoptera
- Family: Tortricidae
- Genus: Cochylimorpha
- Species: C. elongana

Binomial name
- Cochylimorpha elongana (Fischer von Röslerstamm, 1839)

Synonyms
- Cochylis elongana Fischer von Röslerstamm, 1839; Conchylis favillana Staudinger, 1859; Conchylis impurana Mann, 1855; Conchylis tetricana Mann, 1864

= Cochylimorpha elongana =

Species of moth

Cochylimorpha elongana is a moth of the family Tortricidae. It is found in most of Europe, except Fennoscandia, Ireland, Great Britain, the Baltic region and most of the Balkan Peninsula. It is also found in Asia Minor.

The wingspan is about 17 mm.

The larvae feed on Artemisia campestris, Helichrysum species and Achillea millefolium.
