= Julius von Kennel =

German zoologist and entomologist

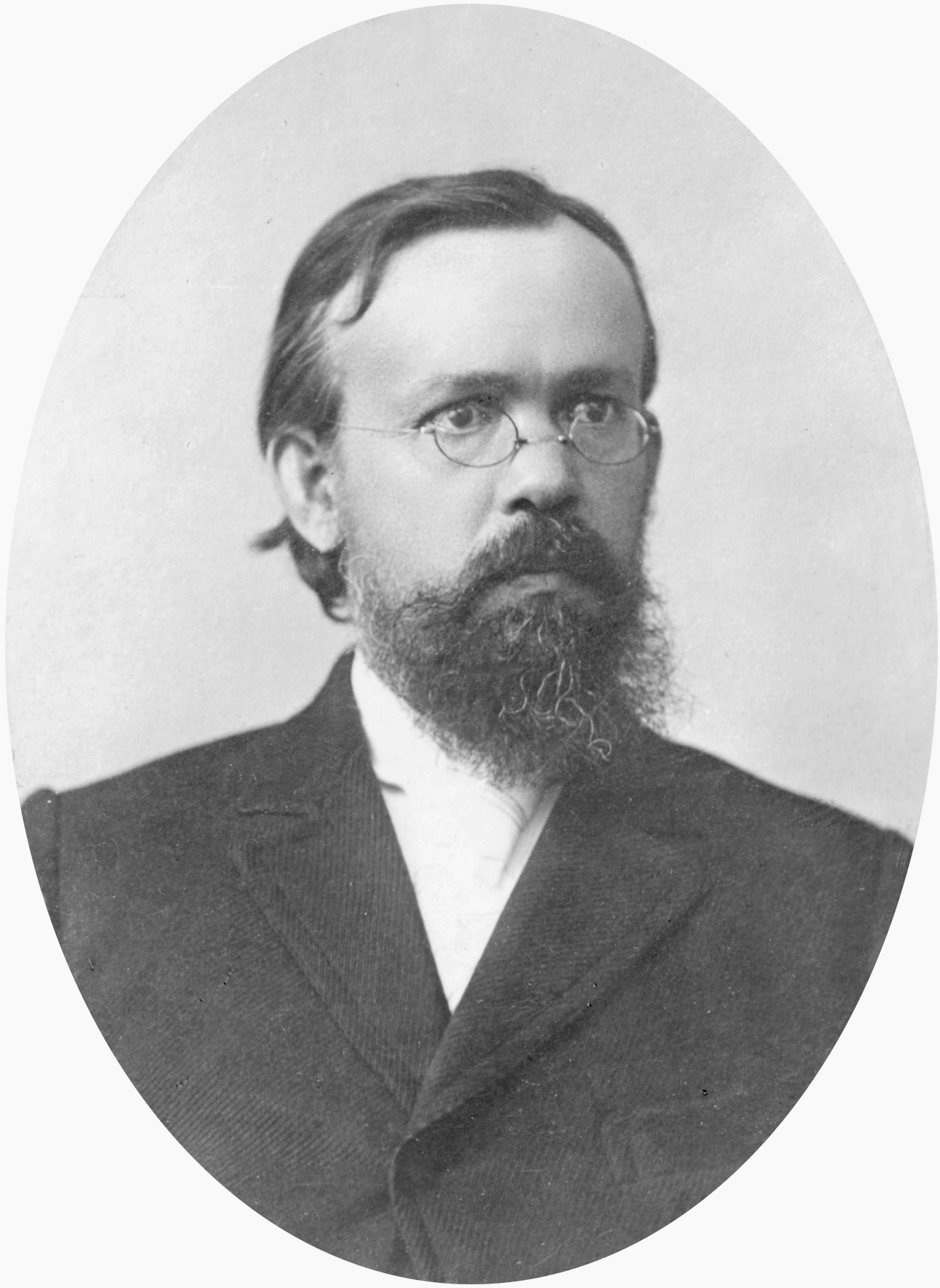
Julius von Kennel

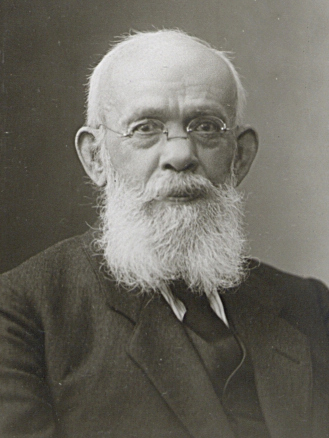
Julius von Kennel

Julius von Kennel (10 June 1854 – 24 January 1939) was a German zoologist and entomologist born in Schwegenheim.

He studied at the University of Würzburg, where he came under the influence of zoologist Karl Semper (1832–1893). Later, he worked as an assistant to Karl August Möbius (1825–1908) at the University of Kiel, and following his habilitation, he returned to the university of Würzburg. In 1882-83 he participated on a research expedition to Trinidad and Venezuela (including the Orinoco River region). Later, he served as a lecturer at the Forstakademie in Aschaffenburg, and from 1887 to 1915, was a full professor of zoology at the Imperial University of Dorpat.

Kennel was an authority on Microlepidoptera, and in particular the family- Tortricidae (tortrix moths). In 1898-99 he was president of the Estonian Naturalists' Society, and in 1922 became director of the zoological museum in Riga.

== Written works ==
- 1883: Biologische und faunistische Notizen aus Trinidad. 28 pp. - Biological and faunistic notes from Trinidad.
- 1887: Über Theilung und Knospung der Thiere. 60 pp.
- 1891: Die Verwandtschaftsverhältnisse der Arthropoden, K. F. Koehler. 48 pp. - Relationships of arthropods.
- 1893: Lehrbuch der Zoologie. Stuttgart: Ferdinand Enke. 678 pp. - Textbook of zoology.
- 1896: Studien über sexuellen Dimorphismus: Variation und verwandte Erscheinungen. Druck von C. Mattiesen. 64 pp. - Studies of sexual dimorphism: variation and related phenomena.
- 1921, The Palaearktischen Tortriciden, eine monographische Darstellung. Stuttgart: E. Schweizerbart'sche Verlagsbuchhandlung. 742 pp. - Palaearctic Tortricidae, a monograph.pdf at Zobodat
- 1923, Ueber Ctenodrilus Pardalis Clap, Ein Beitr. Zur Kenntniss Der Anatomie Und Knospung Der Anneliden, Neuauflage BiblioBazaar, 2010.
