= Felsenstein =

Felsenstein is a surname. Notable people with the surname include:

- Joseph Felsenstein (born 1942), phylogeneticist
  - Felsenstein's tree pruning algorithm
- Lee Felsenstein (born 1945), computer engineer
- Walter Felsenstein (1901–1975), theater and opera director
