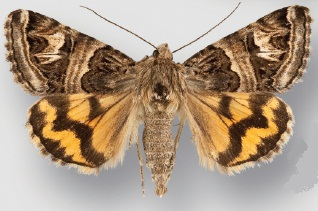
- Male

Scientific classification
- Kingdom: Animalia
- Phylum: Arthropoda
- Clade: Pancrustacea
- Class: Insecta
- Order: Lepidoptera
- Superfamily: Noctuoidea
- Family: Erebidae
- Genus: Drasteria
- Species: D. parallela

Binomial name
- Drasteria parallela Crabo & Mustelin, 2013

= Drasteria parallela =

Species of moth

Drasteria parallela is a moth in the family Erebidae. It is found in the Cascade Mountains of Washington, the Klamath and Siskiyou Mountains of south-western Oregon and the northern Sierra Nevada in California. The habitat consists of exposed ridges in forests at middle elevations.

The length of the forewings is 17–20 mm for males and 18 mm for females. The forewings are covered with brown, tan, and gray scales. The ground color of the wing from the base to the antemedial line and subterminal areas is dark brown with tan and lead-gray mottling. The medial area is light tan, darker near costa, and the terminal area is whitish gray to gray medially and blue gray to brown gray at the margin, with a dark gray to black spot at the apex. The dorsal hindwing ground color is dull light yellow orange to dull orange, with strong suffusion of gray scales at the base and along the inner margin. Adults are on wing in July.

== Etymology ==
The name refers to the parallel lines across the pale medial area of the forewing. This name perpetuates the geometry references of the related species Drasteria divergens and Drasteria convergens.
