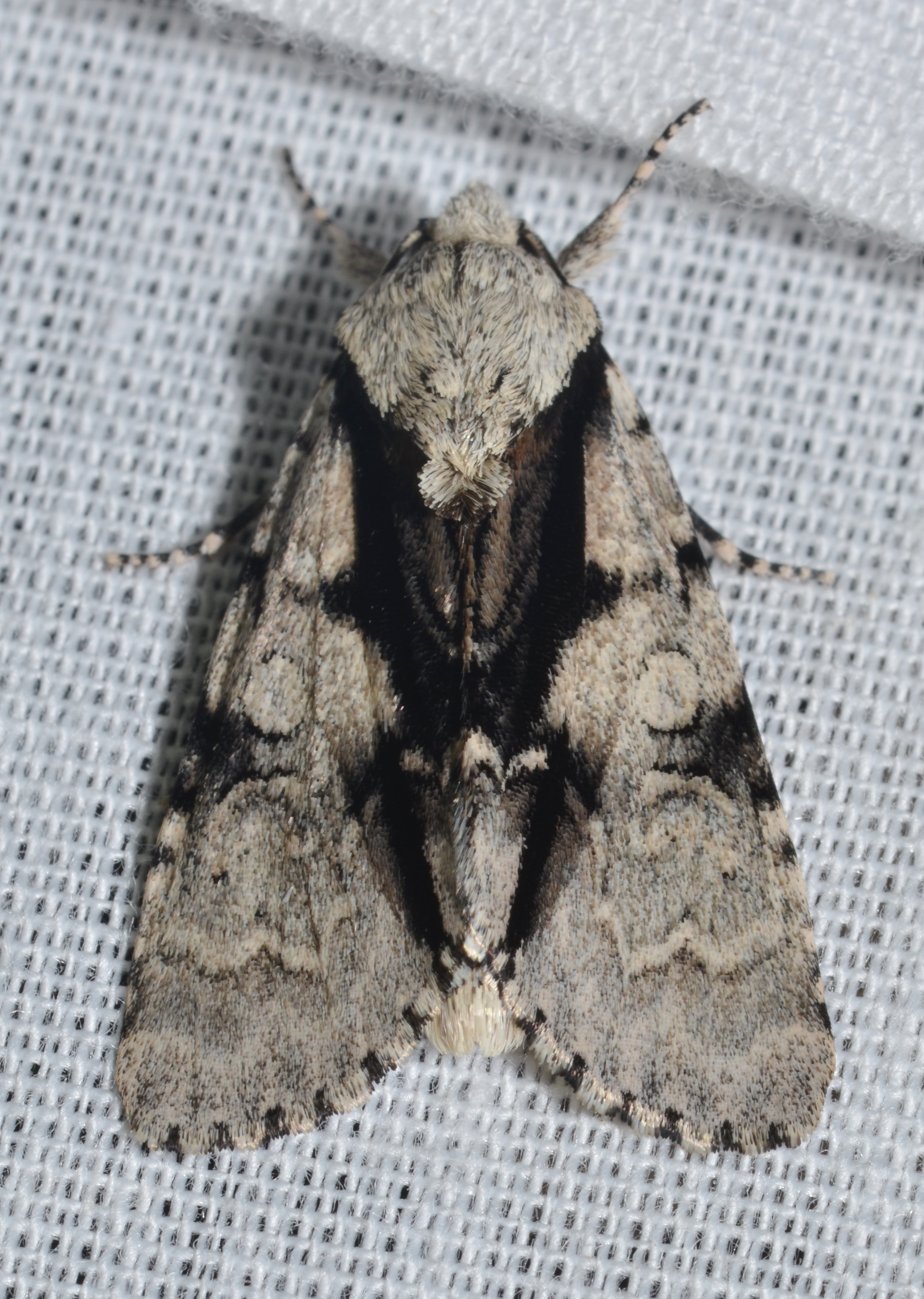

Scientific classification
- Kingdom: Animalia
- Phylum: Arthropoda
- Clade: Pancrustacea
- Class: Insecta
- Order: Lepidoptera
- Superfamily: Noctuoidea
- Family: Noctuidae
- Genus: Acronicta
- Species: A. funeralis

Binomial name
- Acronicta funeralis Grote & Robinson, 1866

Synonyms
- Acronicta fuscalis

= Acronicta funeralis =

Species of moth

Acronicta funeralis, the funerary dagger moth or paddle caterpillar, is a moth of the family Noctuidae. The species was first described by Augustus Radcliffe Grote and Coleman Townsend Robinson in 1866. It has a scattered distribution. It is found in North America from Manitoba to Nova Scotia, south to Maryland. It is also found in Georgia, Mississippi, Texas, and along the west-coast from California to British Columbia.

The wingspan is 32–40 mm. Adults are on wing from May to August depending on the location. It has two or more generations per year in the south and one or two in the north.

The larvae feed on leaves of alder, apple, birch, blueberry and huckleberry, cottonwood, dogwood, elm, hazel, hickory, maple, oak and willow.

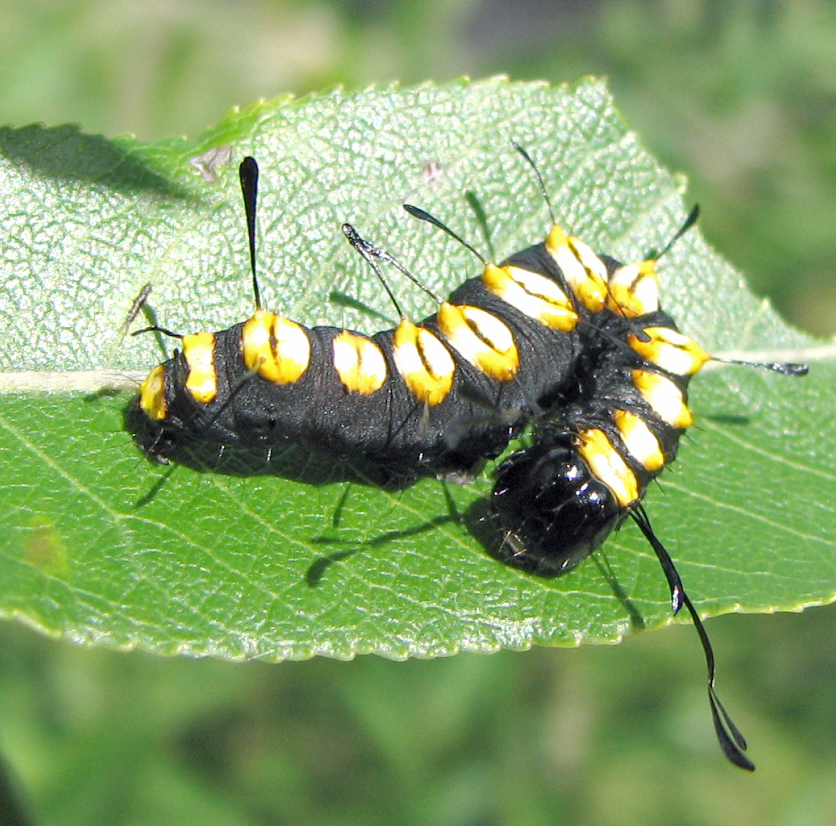
Acronicta funeralis larva, advanced instar
