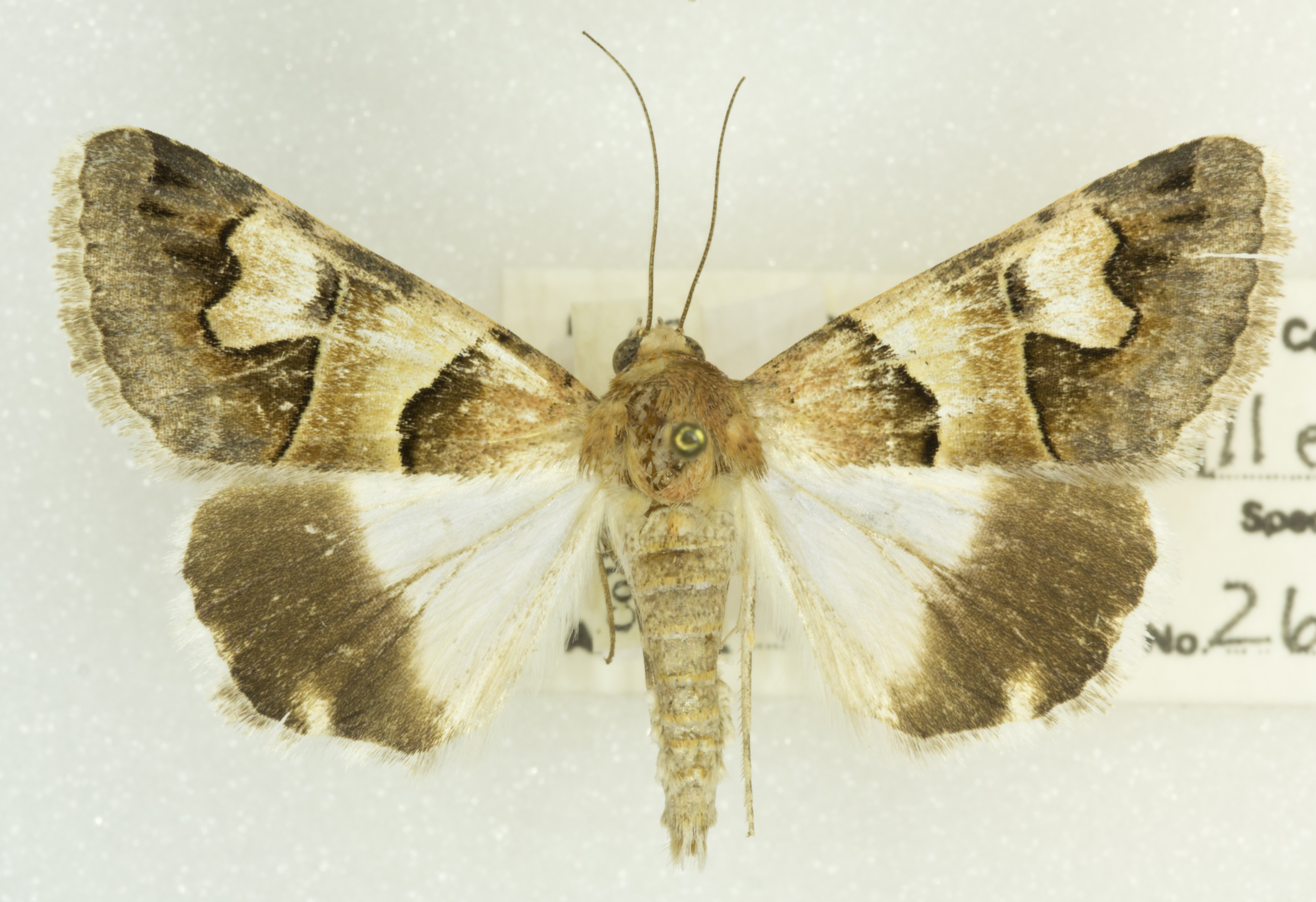

Scientific classification
- Kingdom: Animalia
- Phylum: Arthropoda
- Class: Insecta
- Order: Lepidoptera
- Superfamily: Noctuoidea
- Family: Erebidae
- Genus: Drasteria
- Species: D. pallescens

Binomial name
- Drasteria pallescens (Grote & Robinson, 1866)

Synonyms
- Aedia pallescens Grote & Robinson, 1866; Melipotis tenella H. Edwards, 1881; Synedoida pallescens (Grote & Robinson, 1866)

= Drasteria pallescens =

Cowhead arches

Species of moth

Drasteria pallescens, the cowhead arches, is a moth of the family Erebidae. The species was first described by Augustus Radcliffe Grote and Coleman Townsend Robinson in 1866. It is found in North America from Alberta and Saskatchewan south to Texas and Baja California.

The wingspan is about 35 mm. Adults are on wing in June in the north. Probably earlier southward.
