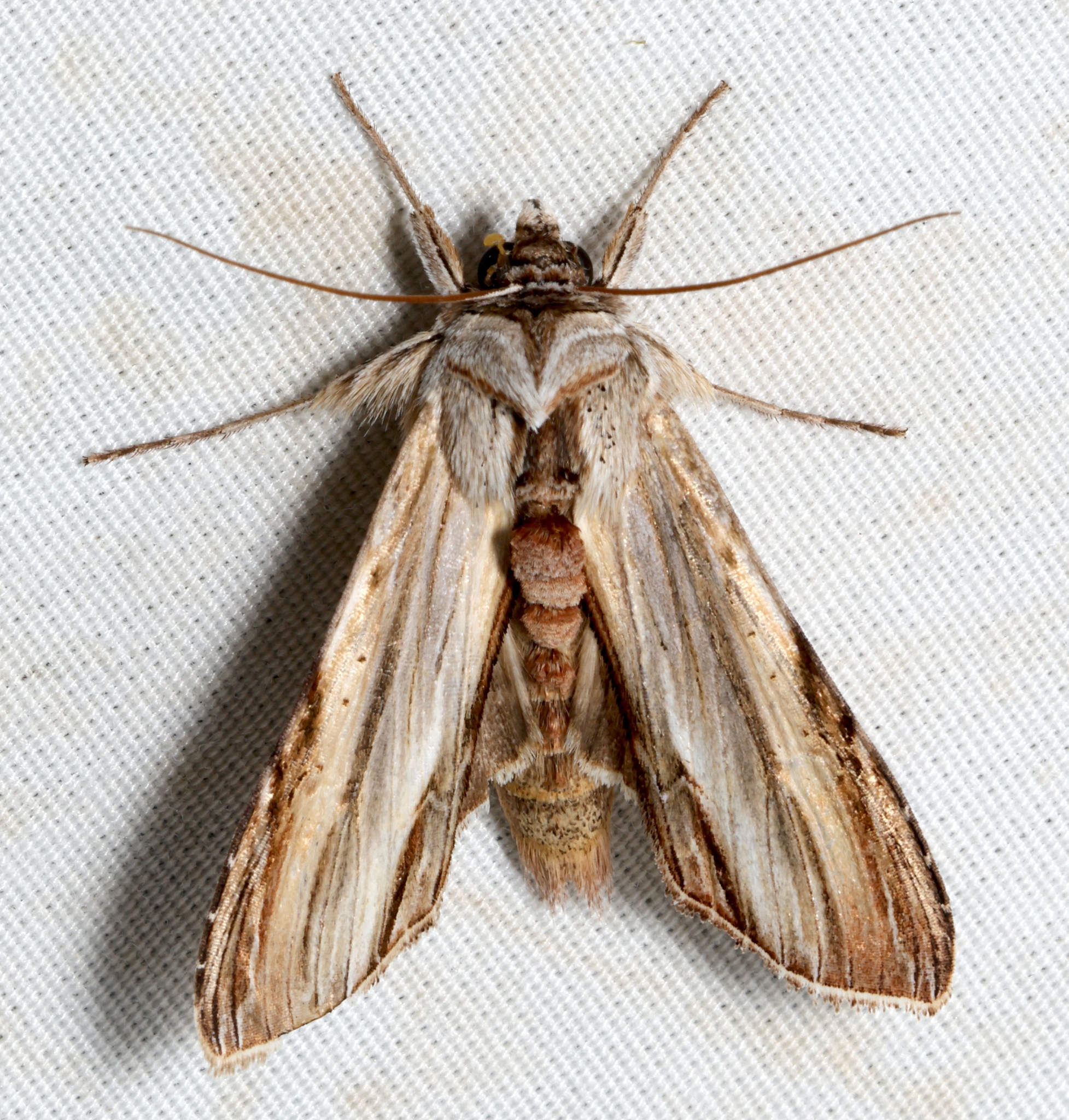
- Adult
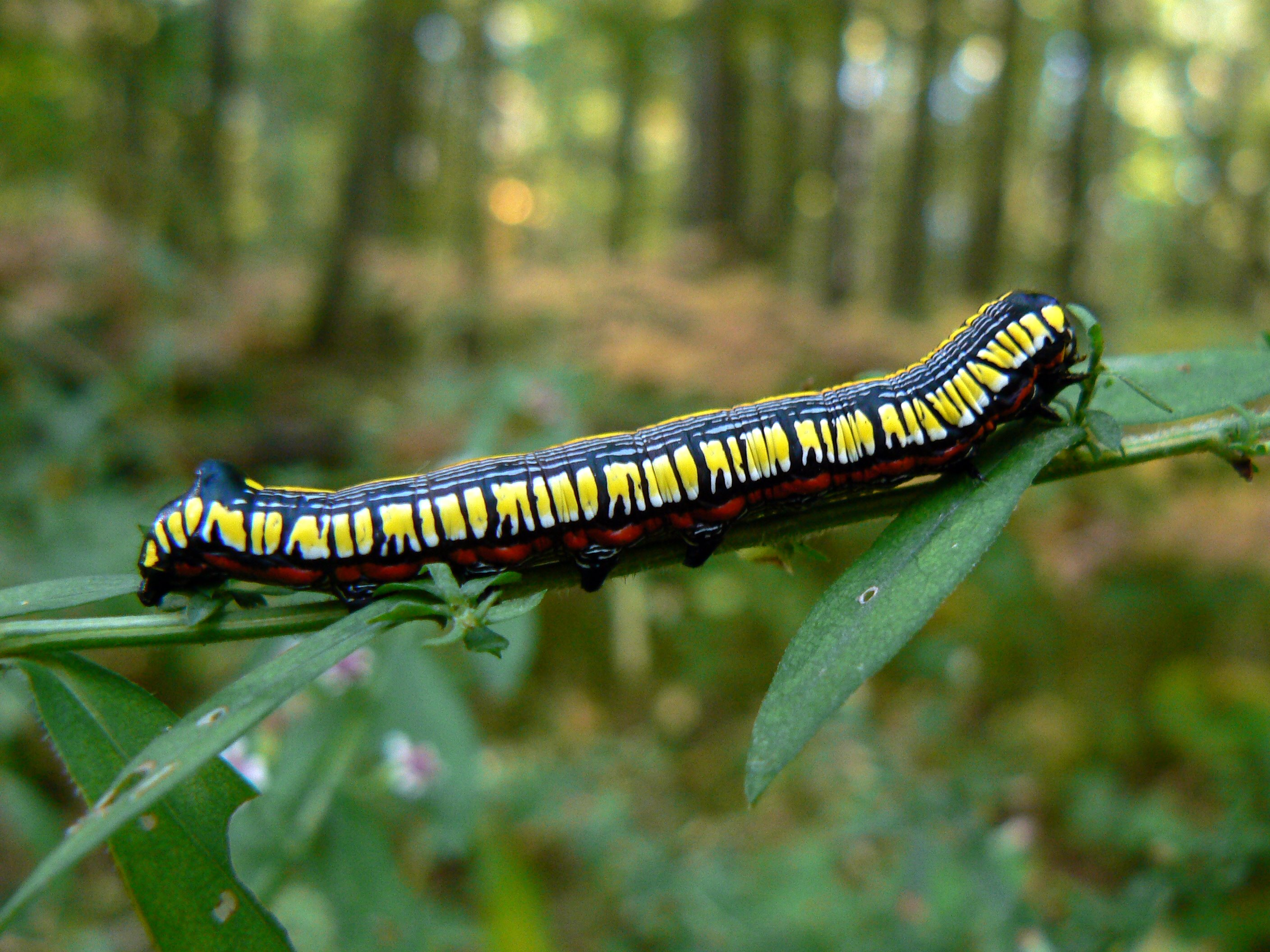
- Larva

Scientific classification
- Kingdom: Animalia
- Phylum: Arthropoda
- Class: Insecta
- Order: Lepidoptera
- Superfamily: Noctuoidea
- Family: Noctuidae
- Genus: Cucullia
- Species: C. convexipennis

Binomial name
- Cucullia convexipennis Grote & Robinson, 1868

= Cucullia convexipennis =

Species of moth

Cucullia convexipennis, the brown-hooded owlet or brown-bordered cucullia, is a moth of the family Noctuidae. The species was first described by Augustus Radcliffe Grote and Coleman Townsend Robinson in 1868. It is found in the north-eastern parts of the United States and adjacent parts of Canada.

The wingspan is 40–50 mm. The length of the forewings is 19–23 mm. The moth flies from May to September depending on the location.

The larvae feed on Aster, Solidago and Callistephus chinensis.
