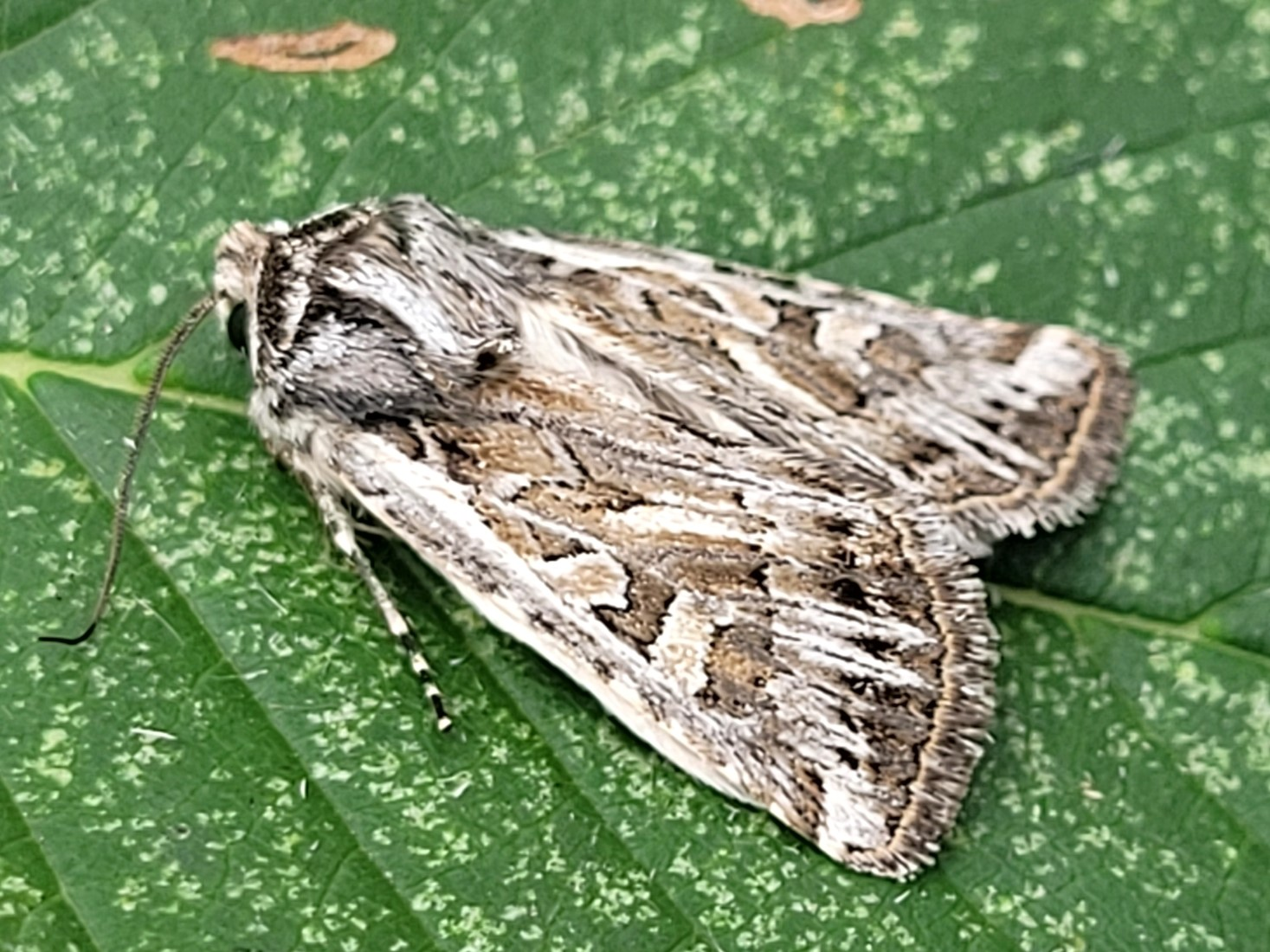

Scientific classification
- Domain: Eukaryota
- Kingdom: Animalia
- Phylum: Arthropoda
- Class: Insecta
- Order: Lepidoptera
- Superfamily: Noctuoidea
- Family: Noctuidae
- Genus: Euxoa
- Species: E. cicatricosa

Binomial name
- Euxoa cicatricosa (Grote & Robinson, 1865)

Synonyms
- Agrotis cicatricosa Grote & Robinson, 1865; Carneades neomexicana Smith, 1890; Setagrotis ducalis Smith, 1907; Euxoa teplia Smith, 1910

= Euxoa cicatricosa =

Species of moth

Euxoa cicatricosa is a species of moth in the family Noctuidae that was first described by Augustus Radcliffe Grote and Coleman Townsend Robinson in 1865. It is found in North America from south-central Saskatchewan west to the southern interior of British Columbia; south to southern California, Arizona, New Mexico and western Texas; east to western Nebraska and North Dakota.

The wingspan is 29–32 mm. Adults are on wing in August to September. There is one generation per year.
