= Drasteria hastingsii =

Scientific classification
- Domain: Eukaryota
- Kingdom: Animalia
- Phylum: Arthropoda
- Class: Insecta
- Order: Lepidoptera
- Superfamily: Noctuoidea
- Family: Erebidae
- Genus: Drasteria
- Species: D. hastingsii

Binomial name
- Drasteria hastingsii (Edwards, 1878)

Synonyms
- Syneda hastingsii H. Edwards, 1878; Syneda perpallida H. Edwards, 1881; Drasteria mirifica hastingsi

Species of moth

Drasteria hastingsii is a moth of the family Erebidae. It is found from British Columbia south to Oregon and California.

== Taxonomy ==
It was formerly known as a subspecies of Drasteria mirifica.
