= Michael Lynch (geneticist) =

American geneticist (born 1951)

- Born: December 6, 1951 (age 74); Auburn, New York, U.S.
- Education: University of Minnesota
- Known for: contributions to Population Genetics, Quantitative Genetics,
- Awards: Sciences
- Scientific career
- Fields: Genetics, Population genetics, Evolution
- Workplaces: Indiana University, Arizona State University

Michael Lynch (born December 6, 1951) is an American geneticist who is the Director of the Biodesign Institute for Mechanisms of Evolution at Arizona State University, Tempe, Arizona.

== Biography ==
Lynch held a Distinguished Professorship of Evolution, Population Genetics and Genomics at Indiana University, Bloomington, Indiana. Besides over 250 papers, especially in population genetics, he has written a two volume textbook with Bruce Walsh. Alongside this textbook he has also published two other books. He promotes neutral theories to explain genomic architecture based on the effects of population sizes in different lineages; he presented this point of view in his 2007 book "The Origins of Genome Architecture". In 2009, he was elected to the National Academy of Sciences (Evolutionary Biology). Lynch was a Biology undergraduate at St. Bonaventure University and received a B.S. in Biology in 1973. He obtained his PhD from the University of Minnesota (Ecology and Behavioral Biology) in 1977.

== Research ==
=== Evolution of genome architecture ===
Population genetics principles, phylogenetic analyses, rate calculations, and allele frequency spectra of derived SNPs are employed to understand evolutionary mechanisms behind eukaryotic genome complexity. Hypotheses around the ideas that eukaryotic genome complexity evolved as a result of a passive response to reduced population size, deleterious newly arisen introns in species of Daphnia, genomic response to alterations in population size and mutation rates in E. coli and the evolutionary fates of duplicate genes in of species of Paramecium using complete genomic sequencing are investigated.

=== Role of mutation in evolution ===
Most mutations are mildly deleterious, and they can eventually lead to decreased evolutionary fitness in a species and increase their risk of extinction. Using the Tree of Life, Lynch investigates the significant variation across diverse invertebrates and simple eukaryotic and prokaryotic organisms using a mutation-accumulation strategy. To address this mutation diversity and the load of mutation on survival in some species, a novel method involving a mutation accumulation strategy that is followed by whole genome sequencing allows for estimation of error rates in transcription and variation among eukaryotic lineages. The work done to estimate this variation translates to population genetic theories for mutation rates and how somatic mutations can eventually evolve to multicellularity. These approaches promote the evolutionary ideas of the drift-barrier hypothesis.

=== Role of recombination in evolution ===
A major drawback of sexual recombination is the separation of complexes of alleles that have adapted together. Study of Daphnia pulex, a microcrustacean that has the ability to reproduce sexually and asexually based upon which is advantageous at particular evolutionary time points, allows for direct quantification and comparison of recombination rates in mobile genetic elements in sexual and asexual lineages. This species of the Daphnia asexual lineage is rather young in an evolutionary time perspective and rapidly go extinct. It is hypothesized that this rapid extinction is caused by a loss of heterozygosity caused by asexual reproduction as well as gene conversion exposing them to pre-existing deleterious mutations. A new reference genome assembly of this species has recently been generated and attention to the role of recombination in Daphnia has been of hallmark importance to Lynch's research in recent years.

=== Evolutionary cell biology ===
Currently, no formal field of evolutionary cell biology exists. The link between the evolution of phenotypes and molecular evolution is found at the level of cellular architecture. Recent work spearheaded by Michael Lynch and his lab seeks to link traditional evolutionary theory with molecular and cellular biology alongside comparative cellular biology observations. Using Paramecium as a model species, studies of the evolutionary basis of: evolution of cellular surveillance mechanisms, barriers as a result of random genetic drift on molecular perfection, multimeric proteins, vesicle transport and gene expression.

== Honors and awards ==
- 2013: President of the Genetics Society of America
- 2022: Thomas Hunt Morgan Medal

== See also ==
- Drift-barrier hypothesis
- Dysgenics
