= Drasteria hudsonica =

Northern arches

Scientific classification
- Kingdom: Animalia
- Phylum: Arthropoda
- Clade: Pancrustacea
- Class: Insecta
- Order: Lepidoptera
- Superfamily: Noctuoidea
- Family: Erebidae
- Genus: Drasteria
- Species: D. hudsonica

Binomial name
- Drasteria hudsonica (Grote & Robinson, 1865)

Synonyms
- Syneda hudsonica Grote & Robinson, 1865; Synedoida hudsonica (Grote & Robinson, 1865); Syneda heathi Barnes & McDunnough, 1918; Syneda pedionis Hampson, 1926; Syneda seposita Edwards, 1881

Species of moth

Drasteria hudsonica, the northern arches, is a moth of the family Erebidae. The species was first described by Augustus Radcliffe Grote and Coleman Townsend Robinson in 1865. It is found from Alaska and Yukon to California, east to New Mexico and Manitoba.

The wingspan is 35–36 mm. Adults are on wing in June in the north. The flight period is earlier southward.

The larvae feed on Shepherdia canadensis.

== Subspecies ==
- Drasteria hudsonica hudsonica
- Drasteria hudsonica heathi (Barnes & McDunnough, 1918)
- Drasteria hudsonica seposita (Edwards, 1881) (Colorado, Utah)
