= Bruce David Riska =

US evolutionary quantitative geneticits

Bruce D. Riska
- Born: October 7, 1950
- Died: September 4, 1998 (aged 47)
- Education: State University of New York at Stony Brook (PhD 1985), University of Rochester (1980-1981; postdoc), University of Wisconsin, Madison (1982-1987; postdoc), University of Califormia Davis (1987-1990; postdoc)

Bruce Riska was an American evolutionary quantitative geneticist. He was born in San Diego and finished his undergraduate degree in Biology at Occidental College in Los Angeles in 1972. He gained his PhD in Ecology and Evolution in 1980 at State University of New York at Stony Brook, with the work on Geographic variation of morphometric correlation in Pemphigus populicaulis Fitch, advised by Robert R. Sokal. In the postdoctoral research, he worked with R. K. Selander at University of Rochester (1980-1981), William (Bill) R. Atchley and J.J. Rutledge at the University of Wisconsin, Madison (1982-1987), and with Michael Turelli, at University of California, Davis.

Riska was injured in a traffic accident riding a bicycle in Davis in August 1990, from which he never recovered to return to his work.

== Scientific contributions ==
Riska authored a number of contributions on topics in Evolutionary biology, co-creating the field of study at the intersection of evolution and development. The work combines statistical methods of quantitative genetics and mechanistic developmental insight. His early work focused on morphometric variation across geographic range (in a poplar gall aphid during his graduate work, and horshoe crab), after which he turned his attention to the ways that animal trait form, and variation and covariation of traits arise in ontogeny. He developed theoretical work exploring the role of growth in generating the patterns of trait variation and covariation and their influence on evolutionary change. The approaches Riska developed for the study of evolutionary roles of growth, allometry, as well as maternal effects influenced the development of these fields of study.
