= Drasteria eubapta =

Scientific classification
- Kingdom: Animalia
- Phylum: Arthropoda
- Class: Insecta
- Order: Lepidoptera
- Superfamily: Noctuoidea
- Family: Erebidae
- Genus: Drasteria
- Species: D. eubapta

Binomial name
- Drasteria eubapta Hampson, 1926

Species of moth

Drasteria eubapta is a moth of the family Erebidae. It is found in North America, where it has been recorded from Arizona and California.

The wingspan is about 31 mm. Adults have been recorded on wing from March to April and in September.
