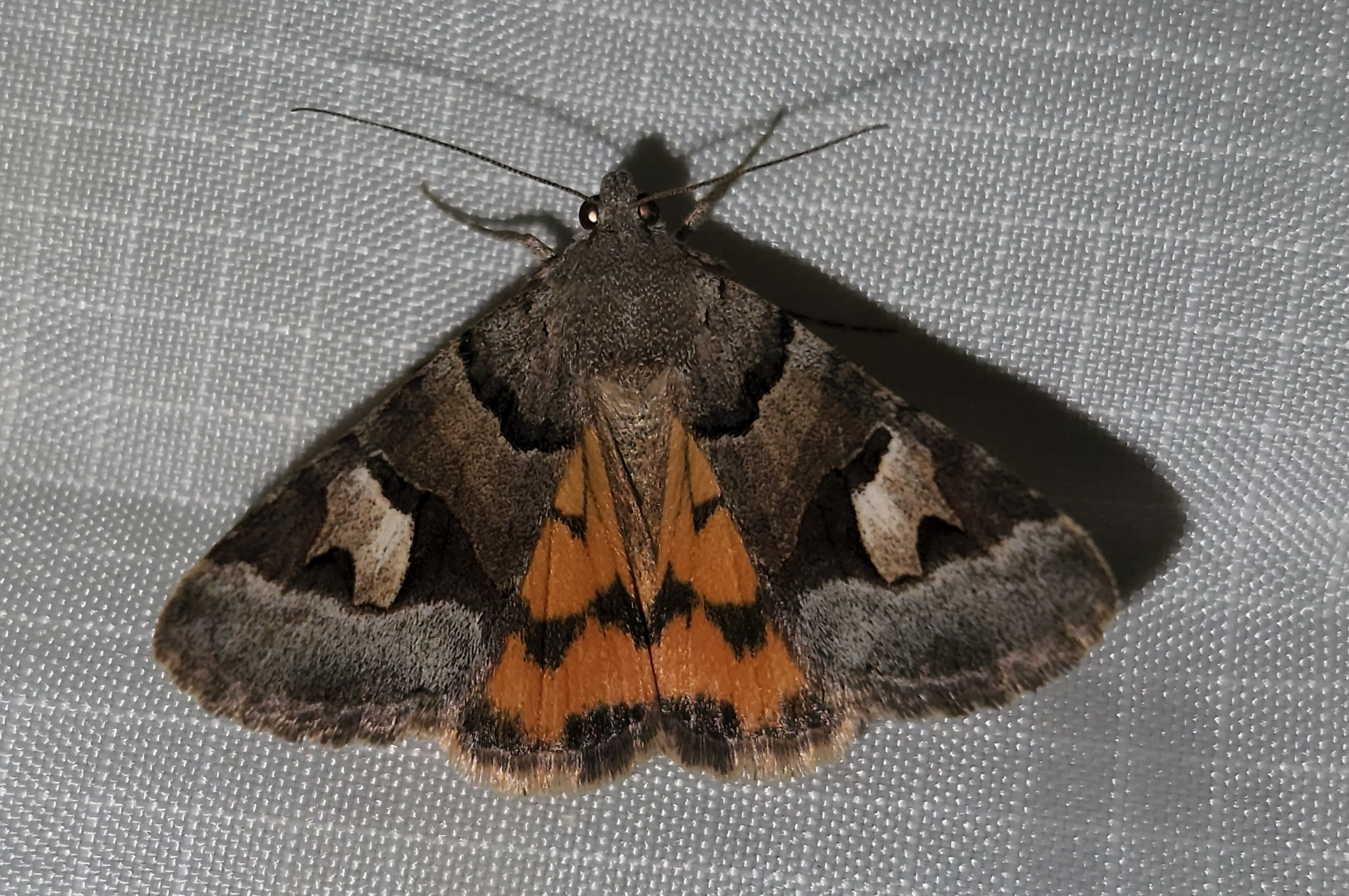

Scientific classification
- Domain: Eukaryota
- Kingdom: Animalia
- Phylum: Arthropoda
- Class: Insecta
- Order: Lepidoptera
- Superfamily: Noctuoidea
- Family: Erebidae
- Genus: Drasteria
- Species: D. stretchii

Binomial name
- Drasteria stretchii (Behr, 1870)

Synonyms
- Syneda stretchii Behr, 1870

= Drasteria stretchii =

Species of moth

Drasteria stretchii is a species of moth in the family Erebidae. It is found in North America, where it has been recorded from northern Nevada., California, Oregon, Wyoming and Washington. The habitat consists of dry, rocky canyons at low to middle elevations.

The length of the forewings is 15–17 mm. Adults are on wing from the beginning of June to July.

The larvae possibly feed on Eriogonum species.
