= Drasteria antiqua =

Scientific classification
- Domain: Eukaryota
- Kingdom: Animalia
- Phylum: Arthropoda
- Class: Insecta
- Order: Lepidoptera
- Superfamily: Noctuoidea
- Family: Erebidae
- Genus: Drasteria
- Species: D. antiqua

Binomial name
- Drasteria antiqua (Staudinger, 1889)

Synonyms
- Leucanitis antiqua Staudinger, 1889

Species of moth

Drasteria antiqua is a moth of the family Erebidae. It is found in Kyrghyzstan and Mongolia.
