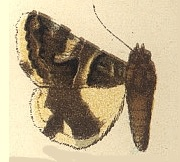

Scientific classification
- Domain: Eukaryota
- Kingdom: Animalia
- Phylum: Arthropoda
- Class: Insecta
- Order: Lepidoptera
- Superfamily: Noctuoidea
- Family: Erebidae
- Genus: Drasteria
- Species: D. sesquistria

Binomial name
- Drasteria sesquistria (Eversmann, 1854)

Synonyms
- Ophiusa sesquistria Eversmann, 1854

= Drasteria sesquistria =

Species of moth

Drasteria sesquistria is a moth of the family Erebidae. It is found in Russia, Kazakhstan, Afghanistan, Uzbekistan, Tajikistan, Kyrgyzstan, Turkmenistan and Mongolia.

The wingspan is about 28 mm. Adults are on wing from April to July.
