= Drasteria habibazel =

Scientific classification
- Domain: Eukaryota
- Kingdom: Animalia
- Phylum: Arthropoda
- Class: Insecta
- Order: Lepidoptera
- Superfamily: Noctuoidea
- Family: Erebidae
- Genus: Drasteria
- Species: D. habibazel

Binomial name
- Drasteria habibazel (Dumont, 1922)

Synonyms
- Leucanitis habibazel Dumont, 1922

Species of moth

Drasteria habibazel is a moth of the family Erebidae. It is found in Tunisia.
