= Drasteria coenobita =

Scientific classification
- Domain: Eukaryota
- Kingdom: Animalia
- Phylum: Arthropoda
- Class: Insecta
- Order: Lepidoptera
- Superfamily: Noctuoidea
- Family: Erebidae
- Genus: Drasteria
- Species: D. coenobita

Binomial name
- Drasteria coenobita (Krüger, 1939)

Synonyms
- Aleucanitis coenobita Krüger, 1939

Species of moth

Drasteria coenobita is a moth of the family Erebidae. It is found in Libya.
