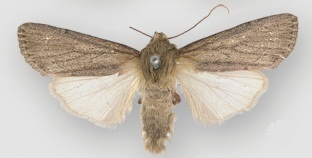
- Male
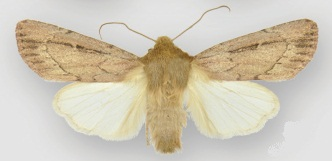
- Female

Scientific classification
- Domain: Eukaryota
- Kingdom: Animalia
- Phylum: Arthropoda
- Class: Insecta
- Order: Lepidoptera
- Superfamily: Noctuoidea
- Family: Noctuidae
- Genus: Ufeus
- Species: U. faunus

Binomial name
- Ufeus faunus Strecker, 1898

= Ufeus faunus =

Species of moth

Ufeus faunus is a moth in the family Noctuidae. It is found in the south-western United States, from south-western California to southern New Mexico.

The length of the forewings is 15–17 mm for males and 17–19 mm for females. Both sexes have pale buffy-brown forewings with black defining a zigzagged antemedial line and a toothed postmedial line with dark shading and streaks in the outer half of the terminal area. In females there usually is a thin dark streak extending from the reniform spot to the postmedial line and, in extreme forms, from the antemedial line into the subterminal area. In both sexes the hindwing is translucent white with some buffy-brown shading on the terminal line.

Larvae have been reported under bark strips of cottonwood and willow near Superior, Arizona, in late March, with adults emerging in early May.
