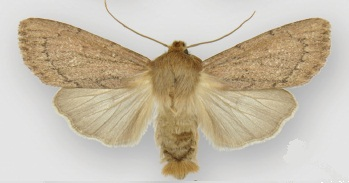
- Male
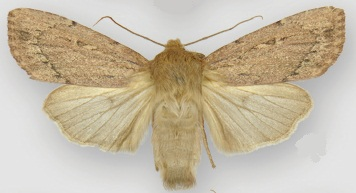
- Female

Scientific classification
- Domain: Eukaryota
- Kingdom: Animalia
- Phylum: Arthropoda
- Class: Insecta
- Order: Lepidoptera
- Superfamily: Noctuoidea
- Family: Noctuidae
- Genus: Ufeus
- Species: U. hulstii

Binomial name
- Ufeus hulstii Smith, 1908

Synonyms
- Ufeus lura Dyar, 1914

= Ufeus hulstii =

Species of moth

Ufeus hulstii is a moth in the family Noctuidae. It is widely distributed in western North America, from central Alaska southward to south-central Mexico and from the Rocky Mountain foothills to the West Coast.

The length of the forewings is 16–22 mm for males and 16–23 mm for females. Adults of both sexes have an orange-brown forewing and fuscous hindwing with males averaging slightly darker than females. Most females have a dark streak through the orbicular and reniform spots, but the streak does not normally extend to the postmedial line or into the basal area of the wing. Adults emerge in early summer and overwinter.

The larvae have feed on poplar, aspen and willow.
