= Drasteria tejonica =

Scientific classification
- Kingdom: Animalia
- Phylum: Arthropoda
- Class: Insecta
- Order: Lepidoptera
- Superfamily: Noctuoidea
- Family: Erebidae
- Genus: Drasteria
- Species: D. tejonica

Binomial name
- Drasteria tejonica (Behr, 1870)

Synonyms
- Syneda tejonica Behr, 1870; Syneda perfecta H. Edwards, 1884; Syneda decepta Strecker, 1898; Syneda nigromarginata Strecker, 1898; Synedoida tejonica (Behr, 1870)

Species of moth

Drasteria tejonica is a moth of the family Erebidae. It has been recorded from California, Arizona, Colorado, Utah and New Mexico.

The wingspan is 30–36 mm.
