= Drasteria sculpta =

Scientific classification
- Kingdom: Animalia
- Phylum: Arthropoda
- Class: Insecta
- Order: Lepidoptera
- Superfamily: Noctuoidea
- Family: Erebidae
- Genus: Drasteria
- Species: D. sculpta

Binomial name
- Drasteria sculpta (Püngeler, 1904)

Synonyms
- Leucanitis sculpta Püngeler, 1904

Species of moth

Drasteria sculpta is a moth of the family Erebidae. It is found in Kyrgyzstan and Kazakhstan.
