= Drasteria kusnezovi =

Scientific classification
- Domain: Eukaryota
- Kingdom: Animalia
- Phylum: Arthropoda
- Class: Insecta
- Order: Lepidoptera
- Superfamily: Noctuoidea
- Family: Erebidae
- Genus: Drasteria
- Species: D. kusnezovi

Binomial name
- Drasteria kusnezovi (John, 1910)

Synonyms
- Leucanitis kusnezovi John, 1910

Species of moth

Drasteria kusnezovi is a moth of the family Erebidae first described by Oscar John in 1910. It is found in Kazakhstan and Uzbekistan.
