= Drasteria maculosa =

Scientific classification
- Domain: Eukaryota
- Kingdom: Animalia
- Phylum: Arthropoda
- Class: Insecta
- Order: Lepidoptera
- Superfamily: Noctuoidea
- Family: Erebidae
- Genus: Drasteria
- Species: D. maculosa

Binomial name
- Drasteria maculosa (Behr, 1870)

Synonyms
- Syneda maculosa Behr, 1870

Species of moth

Drasteria maculosa is a moth of the family Erebidae. It is found in North America, where it has been recorded from Nevada and California.

The wingspan is about 32 mm. Adults have been recorded on wing in August.
