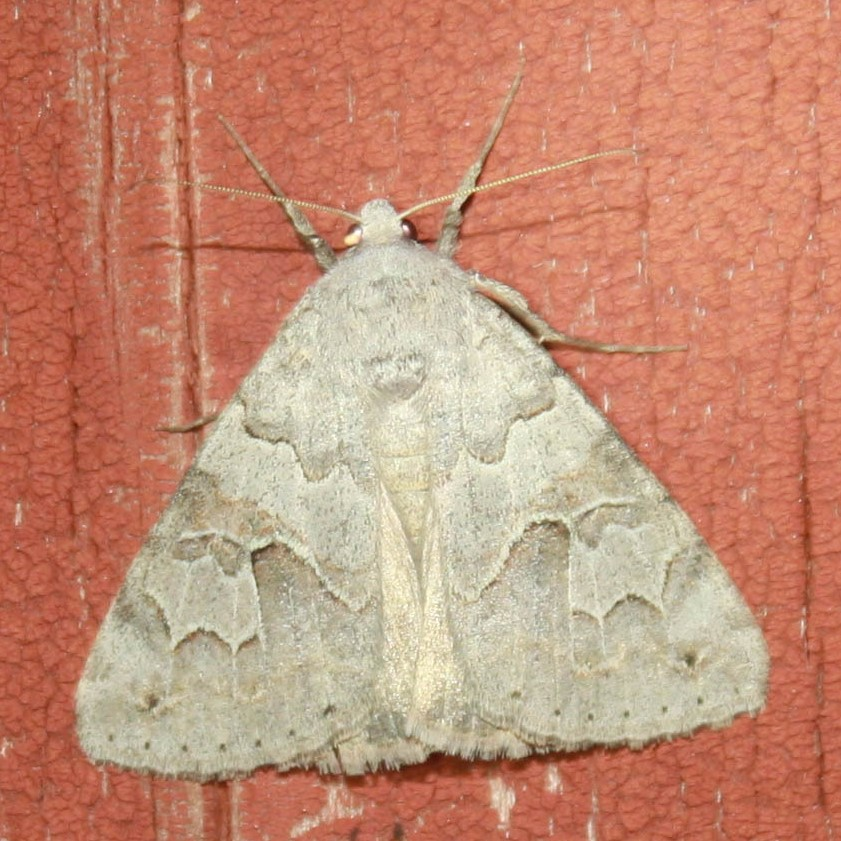

Scientific classification
- Domain: Eukaryota
- Kingdom: Animalia
- Phylum: Arthropoda
- Class: Insecta
- Order: Lepidoptera
- Superfamily: Noctuoidea
- Family: Erebidae
- Genus: Drasteria
- Species: D. scrupulosa

Binomial name
- Drasteria scrupulosa (H. Edwards, 1878)

Synonyms
- Synedoida scrupulosa H. Edwards, 1878

= Drasteria scrupulosa =

Species of moth

Drasteria scrupulosa is a moth of the family Erebidae. It is found in North America, where it has been recorded from California, Idaho, Nevada, Oregon and Utah. The habitat consists of open sagebrush steppes.

The length of the forewings is 18–21 mm. Adults have been recorded on wing in July and August in California.
