= Drasteria rada =

Scientific classification
- Domain: Eukaryota
- Kingdom: Animalia
- Phylum: Arthropoda
- Class: Insecta
- Order: Lepidoptera
- Superfamily: Noctuoidea
- Family: Erebidae
- Genus: Drasteria
- Species: D. rada

Binomial name
- Drasteria rada (Boisduval, 1848)

Synonyms
- Microphisa rada Boisduval, 1848; Leucanitis altivaga Alphéraky, 1893; Leucanitis christophi Alphéraky, 1895; Ophiusa rada Eversmann, 1857; Euclidia roda Herrich-Schäffer, 1851; Leucanitis rada f. schlumbergeri Fuchs, 1903; Leucanitis sibirica Kozhantschikov, 1925

Species of moth

Drasteria rada is a moth of the family Erebidae. It is found in Ukraine, southern Russia, Kazakhstan, Turkey, Georgia, Armenia, Iran, Kyrgyzstan, Mongolia and China (Tibet, Qinghai, Xinjiang).

The wingspan is about 31 mm.
