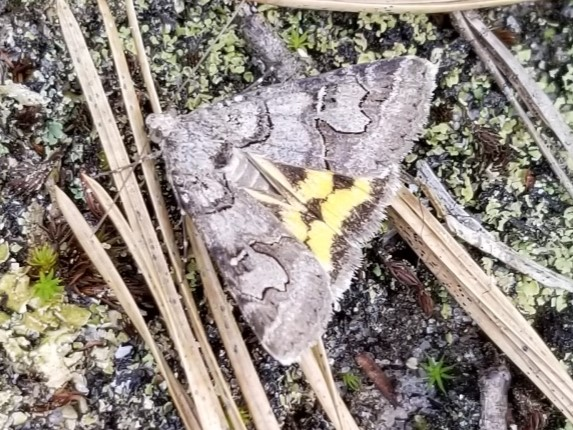

Scientific classification
- Kingdom: Animalia
- Phylum: Arthropoda
- Class: Insecta
- Order: Lepidoptera
- Superfamily: Noctuoidea
- Family: Erebidae
- Genus: Drasteria
- Species: D. graphica

Binomial name
- Drasteria graphica Hübner, 1818

Synonyms
- Euclidia capiticola Walker, 1858; Syneda media Morrison, 1875; Syneda faceta H. Edwards, 1881; Syneda graphica; Drasteria graphica atlantica Barnes & McDunnough, 1918

= Drasteria graphica =

Species of moth

Drasteria graphica, the graphic moth, is a moth of the family Erebidae. The species was first described by Jacob Hübner in 1818. It is found in the United States in coastal dunes from Maine to Florida, west to Mississippi. It is also found along the shores of the Great Lakes in Michigan and Wisconsin. Subspecies D. g. atlantica is listed as threatened in Connecticut.

The wingspan is 30–35 mm. Adults are on wing from May to August and fly during the day.

Larvae consume Hudsonia.
