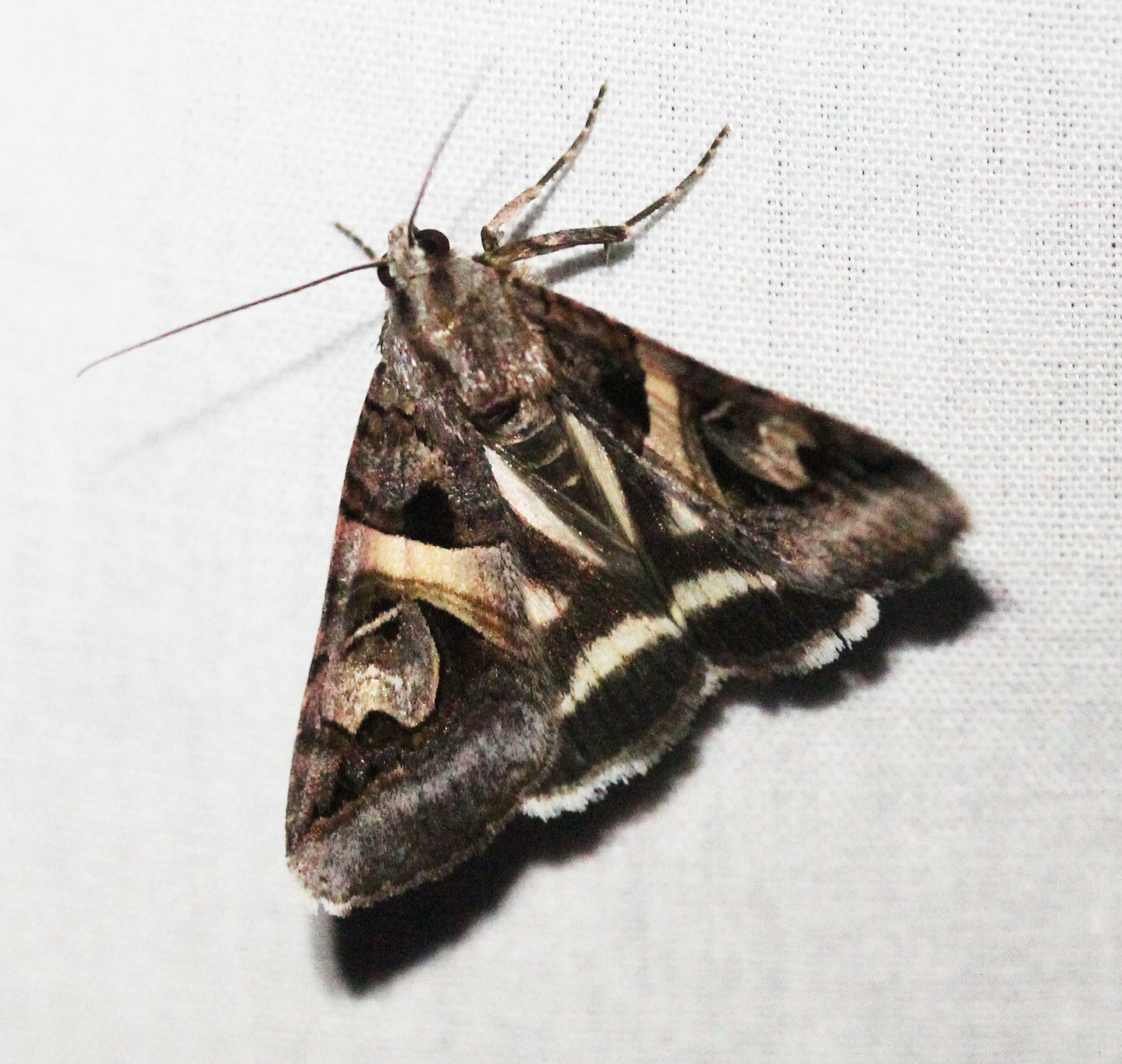

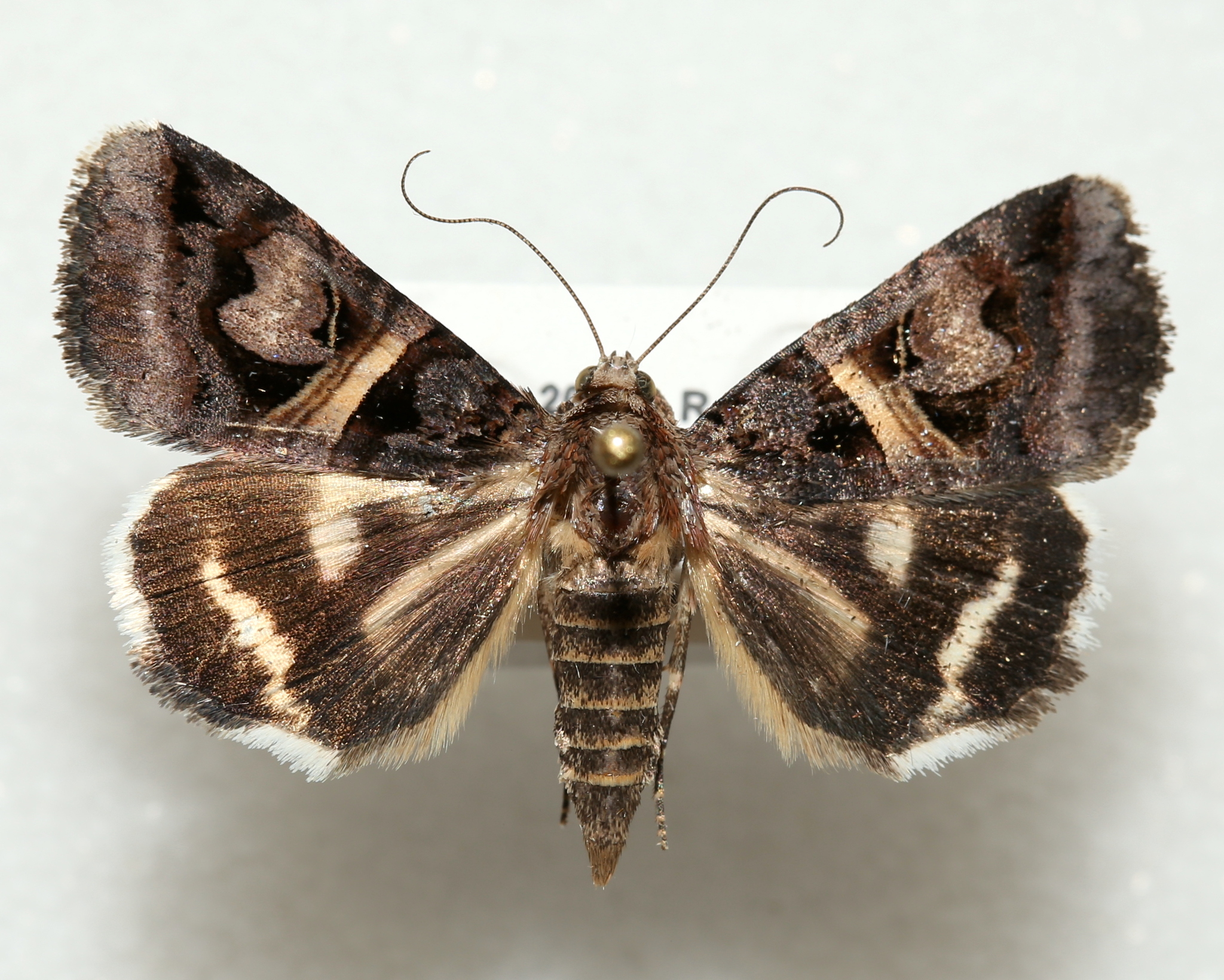

Scientific classification
- Kingdom: Animalia
- Phylum: Arthropoda
- Clade: Pancrustacea
- Class: Insecta
- Order: Lepidoptera
- Superfamily: Noctuoidea
- Family: Erebidae
- Genus: Drasteria
- Species: D. grandirena

Binomial name
- Drasteria grandirena (Haworth, 1809)

Synonyms
- Phytometra grandirena Haworth, 1809; Aedia limbolaris Geyer, 1832; Synedoida grandirena (Haworth, 1809)

= Drasteria grandirena =

Species of moth

Drasteria grandirena, the figure-seven moth or great kidney, is a moth of the family Erebidae first described by Adrian Hardy Haworth in 1809. It is found in North America from Ontario, Quebec and Nova Scotia, south to at least Georgia west to at least Arkansas

The wingspan is about 35 mm. Adults are on wing from March to August in California.

The larvae feed on Hamamelis virginiana.
