= Drasteria pulchra =

Scientific classification
- Domain: Eukaryota
- Kingdom: Animalia
- Phylum: Arthropoda
- Class: Insecta
- Order: Lepidoptera
- Superfamily: Noctuoidea
- Family: Erebidae
- Genus: Drasteria
- Species: D. pulchra

Binomial name
- Drasteria pulchra (Barnes & McDunnough, 1918)

Synonyms
- Syneda pulchra Barnes & McDunnough, 1918

Species of moth

Drasteria pulchra is a moth of the family Erebidae first described by William Barnes and James Halliday McDunnough in 1918. It is found in North America, where it has been recorded from California.

The wingspan is 34–37 mm. The forewings have a black-brown basal area, slightly sprinkled with gray, this area is bordered by a darker line, irregular in course with a prominent inward angle below the median vein, followed by a rounded bulge and then bent strongly backward to the inner margin. The median space is ocherous, grayish brown at the costa and inner margin and crossed outwardly by a brown line. The reniform has the form of a dark lunate blotch bordered inwardly by an ocherous line. There is another line, bent strongly outwardly beyond the cell, forming prominent angles on veins 3, 4 and 6, bent backward below vein 3 to its base, then rounded and rather irregular to the inner margin. Beyond the reniform, there is some white shading especially on veins 3 and 4. The subterminal space is black brown bordered by a pale, quite regular line, parallel to the outer margin with slight inward bend in the submedian fold and preceded in the costal area by black dashes bordered outwardly by a dark line arising from an apical dark streak. The terminal area is violet gray with a marginal dark crenulate line. The hindwings are vermilion with a faint dark discal lunule, a narrow postmedian dark band curving downward at vein 2 to the anal angle, where it is thickest, and median and costal dark blotches on the outer margin. Adults are on wing from June to July.
