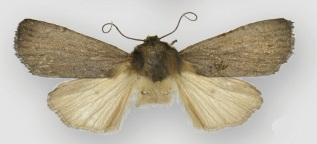
- Male
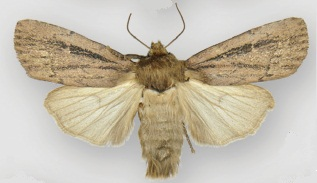
- Female

Scientific classification
- Kingdom: Animalia
- Phylum: Arthropoda
- Class: Insecta
- Order: Lepidoptera
- Superfamily: Noctuoidea
- Family: Noctuidae
- Genus: Ufeus
- Species: U. plicatus

Binomial name
- Ufeus plicatus Grote, 1878

Synonyms
- Ufeus unicolor Grote, 1878

= Ufeus plicatus =

Species of moth

Ufeus plicatus is a moth in the family Noctuidae. It has been recorded from Illinois, Iowa, Minnesota, Missouri, Nebraska, Pennsylvania, southern Quebec and Connecticut, but might be widespread in north-eastern North America. The species is associated with large poplars, especially eastern cottonwood (Populus deltoides) growing in moist areas along rivers where there is abundant loose rotting strips of bark near the base of the tree.

The length of the forewings is 16–19 mm for males and 17–20 mm for females. The eggs are laid in the spring with adults emerging in late spring and early summer, but mainly aestivating until the fall before becoming active. Adults have been recorded in all months except June, but most records are from October and November in the fall and March and April in the spring. The scarcity of adults, even in suitable habitats where they are known to occur, suggests they may not be strongly attracted to light.

The larvae have feed on Populus deltoides. The larvae hide under strips of bark of their host plant during the day and the adults likely hide there also during the day and in the winter.
