= Drasteria cashmirensis =

Scientific classification
- Kingdom: Animalia
- Phylum: Arthropoda
- Class: Insecta
- Order: Lepidoptera
- Superfamily: Noctuoidea
- Family: Erebidae
- Genus: Drasteria
- Species: D. cashmirensis

Binomial name
- Drasteria cashmirensis (Hampson, 1894)

Synonyms
- Melipotis cashmirensis Hampson, 1894

Species of moth

Drasteria cashmirensis is a moth of the family Erebidae. It is found in India (Jammu and Kaschmir, Ladakh).
