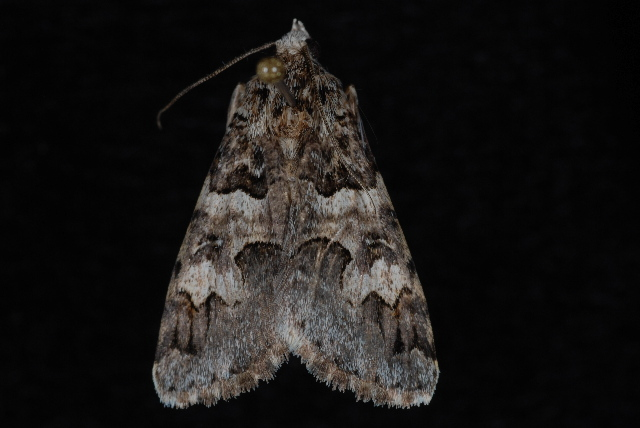

Scientific classification
- Domain: Eukaryota
- Kingdom: Animalia
- Phylum: Arthropoda
- Class: Insecta
- Order: Lepidoptera
- Superfamily: Noctuoidea
- Family: Erebidae
- Genus: Drasteria
- Species: D. sabulosa

Binomial name
- Drasteria sabulosa (Edwards, 1881)

Synonyms
- Synenoida sabulosa H. Edwards, 1881; Syneda abrupta Barnes & McDunnough, 1918; Synedoida sabulosa abrupta (Barnes & McDunnough, 1918); Syneda nichollae Hampson, 1926; Drasteria nichollae Hampson, 1926; Drasteria garthi Richards, 1939

= Drasteria sabulosa =

Species of moth

Drasteria sabulosa is a moth of the family Erebidae. It is found from British Columbia south into the United States where it found as far east as Wyoming, Utah, Colorado, New Mexico and as far south as Arizona.

The wingspan is 33–37 mm.
