= Drasteria yerburyi =

Scientific classification
- Domain: Eukaryota
- Kingdom: Animalia
- Phylum: Arthropoda
- Class: Insecta
- Order: Lepidoptera
- Superfamily: Noctuoidea
- Family: Erebidae
- Genus: Drasteria
- Species: D. yerburyi

Binomial name
- Drasteria yerburyi (Butler, 1892)

Synonyms
- Melipotis yerburyi Butler, 1892; Syneda albifasciata Gaede, 1939; Leucanitis albofasciata John, 1917; Syneda pica Brandt, 1939; Grammodes schematica Meyrick, 1902

Species of moth

Drasteria yerburyi is a moth of the family Erebidae. It is found in Somalia, Eritrea, the United Arab Emirates, Yemen and Iran.

The larvae feed on Taverniera spartea. The species is named after the collector of the type specimen Colonel John William Yerbury.
