= Drasteria obscurata =

Scientific classification
- Domain: Eukaryota
- Kingdom: Animalia
- Phylum: Arthropoda
- Class: Insecta
- Order: Lepidoptera
- Superfamily: Noctuoidea
- Family: Erebidae
- Genus: Drasteria
- Species: D. obscurata

Binomial name
- Drasteria obscurata (Staudinger, 1888)

Synonyms
- Leucanitis obscurata Staudinger, 1888

Species of moth

Drasteria obscurata is a moth of the family Erebidae. It is found in Iran, Afghanistan, Kazakhstan, Kyrgyzstan, Uzbekistan and Tajikistan.
