= Drasteria axuana =

Scientific classification
- Domain: Eukaryota
- Kingdom: Animalia
- Phylum: Arthropoda
- Class: Insecta
- Order: Lepidoptera
- Superfamily: Noctuoidea
- Family: Erebidae
- Genus: Drasteria
- Species: D. axuana

Binomial name
- Drasteria axuana (Püngeler, 1907)

Synonyms
- Leucanitis axuana Püngeler, 1907; Drasteria aksuana

Species of moth

Drasteria axuana is a moth of the family Erebidae. It is found in Mongolia, China (Tibet, Qinghai, Xinjiang) and north-western Pakistan.

== Subspecies ==
- Drasteria axuana axuana (China, Pakistan)
- Drasteria axuana fumiluna Wiltshire, 1969 (Mongolia)
