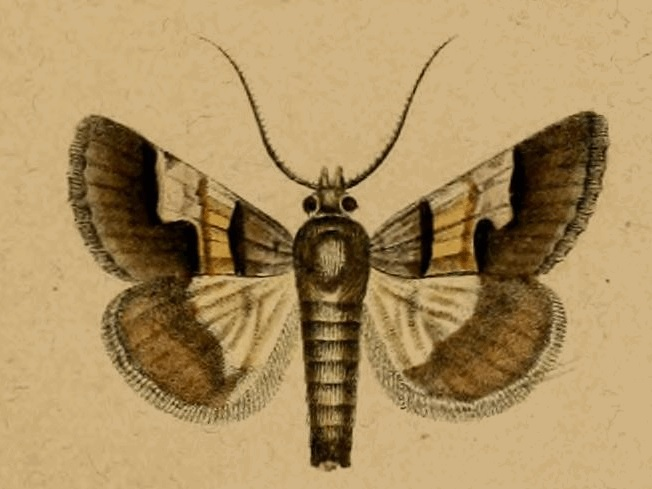

Scientific classification
- Domain: Eukaryota
- Kingdom: Animalia
- Phylum: Arthropoda
- Class: Insecta
- Order: Lepidoptera
- Superfamily: Noctuoidea
- Family: Erebidae
- Genus: Drasteria
- Species: D. caucasica

Binomial name
- Drasteria caucasica (Kolenati, 1848)

Synonyms
- Euclidia caucasica Kolenati, 1848; Leucanitis caucasica f. aksuensis Fuchs, 1903; Ophiusa astrida Eversmann, 1857

= Drasteria caucasica =

Species of moth

Drasteria caucasica is a moth of the family Erebidae. It is found in Romania, north-eastern Bulgaria, southern Moldova, southern Ukraine, Russia, Kazakhstan, Turkey, Daghestan, Armenia, Iraq, Iran, Turkmenistan, Uzbekistan, Tajikistan, Afghanistan, Pakistan, Kyrghyzstan, China (Xinjiang, Tibet) and Mongolia.

The wingspan is 29–32 mm. Adults are on wing from May to August.

The larvae feed on Eleagnus, Hippophae (including Hippophae rhamnoides) and Paliurus species.
