= Drasteria hyblaeoides =

Scientific classification
- Domain: Eukaryota
- Kingdom: Animalia
- Phylum: Arthropoda
- Class: Insecta
- Order: Lepidoptera
- Superfamily: Noctuoidea
- Family: Erebidae
- Genus: Drasteria
- Species: D. hyblaeoides

Binomial name
- Drasteria hyblaeoides (Moore, 1878)

Synonyms
- Heliothis hyblaeoides Moore, 1878; Leucanitis caucasica Alphéraky, 1889 (nec. Kolenati, 1848)

Species of moth

Drasteria hyblaeoides is a moth of the family Erebidae. It is found in Kyrghyzstan, Tajikistan and China (Tibet, Qinghai).
