= Drasteria saisani =

Scientific classification
- Domain: Eukaryota
- Kingdom: Animalia
- Phylum: Arthropoda
- Class: Insecta
- Order: Lepidoptera
- Superfamily: Noctuoidea
- Family: Erebidae
- Genus: Drasteria
- Species: D. saisani

Binomial name
- Drasteria saisani (Staudinger, 1882)

Synonyms
- Leucanitis saisani Staudinger, 1882; Leucanitis clara Staudinger, 1894

Species of moth

Drasteria saisani is a moth of the family Erebidae. It is found in Crimea and in southern Russia, Armenia, Kazakhstan, Uzbekistan, Kyrgyzstan, Tajikistan, Turkmenistan, Daghestan, Turkey, Iran, Afghanistan, Pakistan and China.

The wingspan is 28–30 mm. Adults are on wing from April to August.
