= Drasteria pictoides =

Scientific classification
- Domain: Eukaryota
- Kingdom: Animalia
- Phylum: Arthropoda
- Class: Insecta
- Order: Lepidoptera
- Superfamily: Noctuoidea
- Family: Erebidae
- Genus: Drasteria
- Species: D. pictoides

Binomial name
- Drasteria pictoides Poole, 1989

Synonyms
- Leucanitis picta Staudinger, 1877 (preocc. Christoph, 1877)

Species of moth

Drasteria pictoides is a moth of the family Erebidae. It is found in Syria and the southern Caucasus.
