= Drasteria occulta =

Scientific classification
- Domain: Eukaryota
- Kingdom: Animalia
- Phylum: Arthropoda
- Class: Insecta
- Order: Lepidoptera
- Superfamily: Noctuoidea
- Family: Erebidae
- Genus: Drasteria
- Species: D. occulta

Binomial name
- Drasteria occulta (H. Edwards, 1881)

Synonyms
- Syneda occulta H. Edwards, 1881

Species of moth

Drasteria occulta, the occult drasteria moth, is a moth of the family Erebidae. The species was first described by Henry Edwards in 1881. It is found in North America, where it has been recorded from coastal areas in Maine, New Jersey, Pennsylvania and Texas. It is listed as a species of special concern and believed extirpated in the US state of Connecticut.

The wingspan is about 34 mm.

The larvae feed on Vaccinium species. Full-grown larvae reach a length of 26 mm. They are brown with light brown and blackish lines and with a brown head with white stripes.
