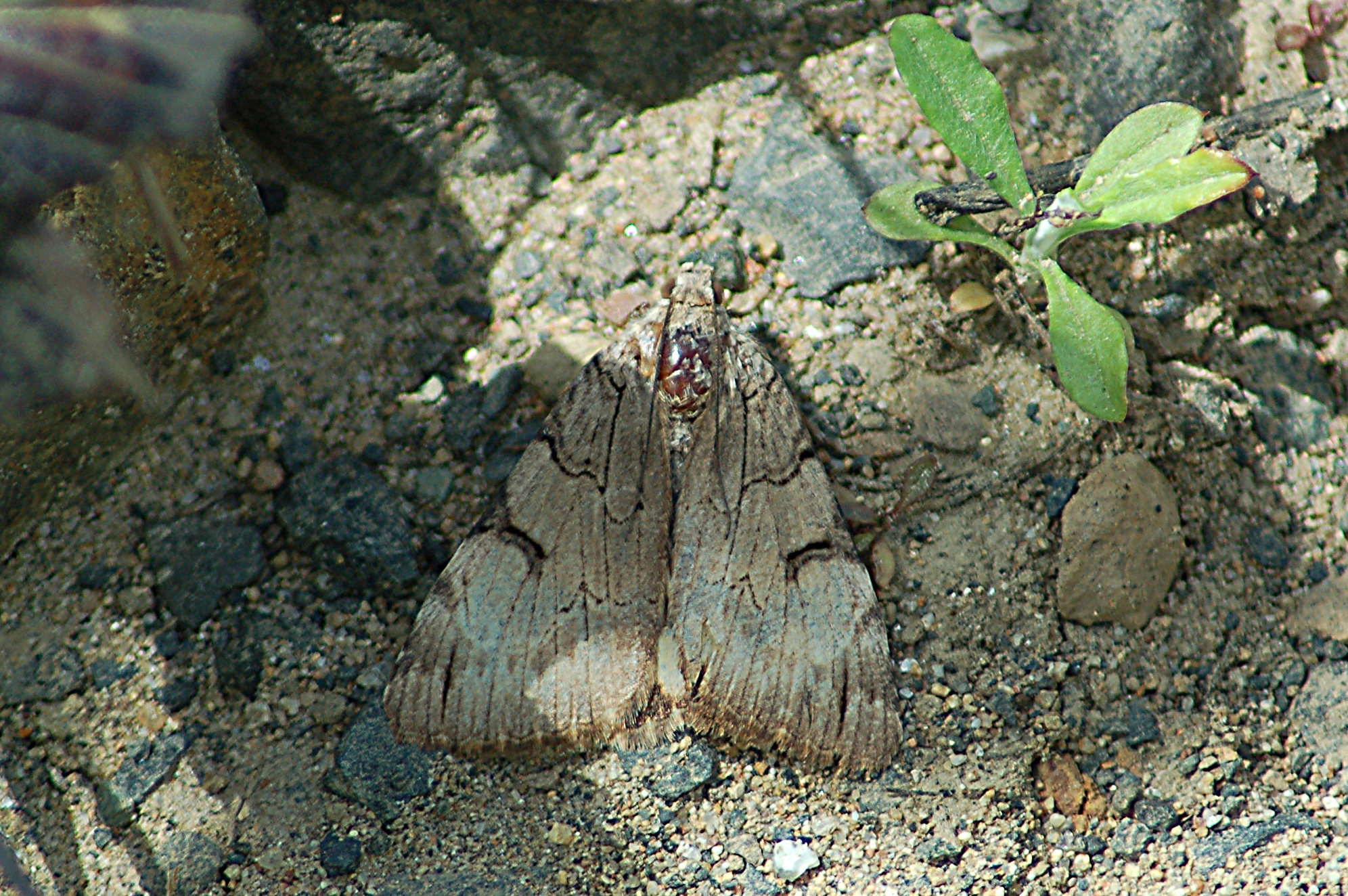

Scientific classification
- Domain: Eukaryota
- Kingdom: Animalia
- Phylum: Arthropoda
- Class: Insecta
- Order: Lepidoptera
- Superfamily: Noctuoidea
- Family: Erebidae
- Genus: Drasteria
- Species: D. ochracea

Binomial name
- Drasteria ochracea (Behr, 1870)

Synonyms
- Syneda ochracea Behr, 1870; Synedoida ochracea (Behr, 1870)

= Drasteria ochracea =

Species of moth

Drasteria ochracea is a moth of the family Erebidae. It is found from British Columbia south through the western parts of the United States from Washington south to Arizona.

The wingspan is about 46 mm.
