= Drasteria mongoliensis =

Scientific classification
- Kingdom: Animalia
- Phylum: Arthropoda
- Class: Insecta
- Order: Lepidoptera
- Superfamily: Noctuoidea
- Family: Erebidae
- Genus: Drasteria
- Species: D. mongoliensis

Binomial name
- Drasteria mongoliensis Wiltshire, 1969

Species of moth

Drasteria mongoliensis is a moth of the family Erebidae found mostly in Russia (Siberia) and Mongolia.
