= Drasteria nubicola =

Scientific classification
- Domain: Eukaryota
- Kingdom: Animalia
- Phylum: Arthropoda
- Class: Insecta
- Order: Lepidoptera
- Superfamily: Noctuoidea
- Family: Erebidae
- Genus: Drasteria
- Species: D. nubicola

Binomial name
- Drasteria nubicola (Behr, 1870)

Synonyms
- Syneda nubicola Behr, 1870

Species of moth

Drasteria nubicola is a moth of the family Erebidae. It is found in North America, where it has been recorded from Nevada, California, Oregon and southern Idaho. The habitat consists of dry, open areas with sand dunes and salt flats.

The length of the forewings is 15–17 mm.
