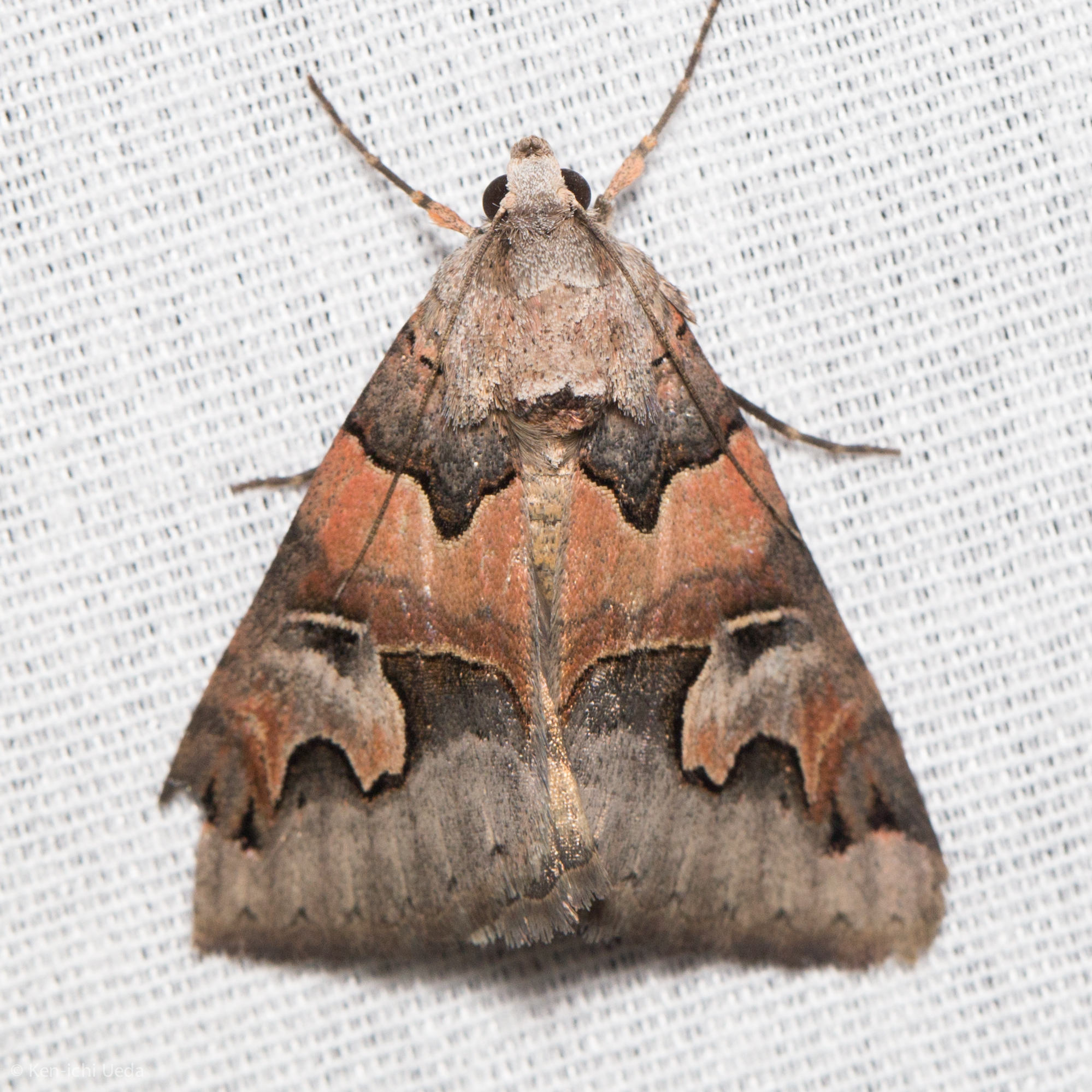

Scientific classification
- Kingdom: Animalia
- Phylum: Arthropoda
- Class: Insecta
- Order: Lepidoptera
- Superfamily: Noctuoidea
- Family: Erebidae
- Genus: Drasteria
- Species: D. fumosa

Binomial name
- Drasteria fumosa (Strecker, 1898)

Synonyms
- Syneda fumosa Strecker, 1898; Synedoida fumosa; Synedoida fumosa brunneifasciata Barnes & McDunnough 1916

= Drasteria fumosa =

Smoky arches

Species of moth

Drasteria fumosa, the smoky arches, is a species of moth in the family Erebidae first described by Herman Strecker in 1898. It is found from the US state of California east to Utah and Texas.

The wingspan is 34–43 mm. Adults are on wing in summer.
