= Drasteria petricola =

Little arches

Scientific classification
- Kingdom: Animalia
- Phylum: Arthropoda
- Class: Insecta
- Order: Lepidoptera
- Superfamily: Noctuoidea
- Family: Erebidae
- Genus: Drasteria
- Species: D. petricola

Binomial name
- Drasteria petricola (Walker, 1858)

Synonyms
- Euclidia petricola Walker, 1858; Syneda petricola (Walker, 1858); Synedoida petricola (Walker, 1858); Syneda athabasca Neumoegen, 1883; Syneda crokeri Barnes & Benjamin, 1924

Species of moth

Drasteria petricola, the little arches, is a moth of the family Erebidae. The species was first described by Francis Walker in 1858. It is found in western North America from Yukon and the Northwest Territories south to New Mexico in the Rocky Mountains, east to Manitoba.

The wingspan is about 34 mm. Adults are on wing from May to July.

The larvae feed on Hedysarum species. Adults feed on the nectar of flowers, including mint in Utah.

== Subspecies ==
- Drasteria petricola petricola
- Drasteria petricola athabasca (Neumoegen, 1883) (mountains of British Columbia)
- Drasteria petricola crokeri (Barnes & Benjamin, 1924) (prairie populations)
