= Drasteria catocalis =

Scientific classification
- Domain: Eukaryota
- Kingdom: Animalia
- Phylum: Arthropoda
- Class: Insecta
- Order: Lepidoptera
- Superfamily: Noctuoidea
- Family: Erebidae
- Genus: Drasteria
- Species: D. catocalis

Binomial name
- Drasteria catocalis (Staudinger, 1882)

Synonyms
- Euclidia catocalis Staudinger, 1882; Aleucanitis reducta Fernandez 1932; Euclidia grumi Alphéraky, 1889

Species of moth

Drasteria catocalis is a moth of the family Erebidae. It is found in Kyrghyzstan, Kazakhstan, Tajikistan, China, Uzbekistan and Russia (Siberia, Altai).
