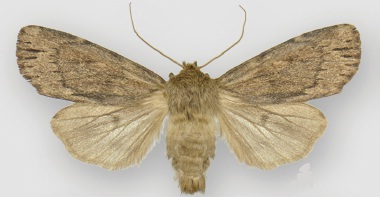
- Ufeus satyricus satyricus male
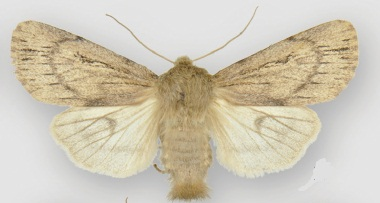
- Ufeus satyricus satyricus female

Scientific classification
- Domain: Eukaryota
- Kingdom: Animalia
- Phylum: Arthropoda
- Class: Insecta
- Order: Lepidoptera
- Superfamily: Noctuoidea
- Family: Noctuidae
- Genus: Ufeus
- Species: U. satyricus

Binomial name
- Ufeus satyricus Grote, 1873

Synonyms
- Asterocampus barometricus Goossens, 1881; Ufeus sagittarius Grote, 1883; Ufeus electra Smith, 1908; Ufeus unicolor ab. coloradica Strand, [1916]; Ufeus unicolor coloradica McDunnough, 1938

= Ufeus satyricus =

Species of moth

Ufeus satyricus is a moth in the family Noctuidae. It occurs across central and southern Canada from the Atlantic to the Pacific where large poplar trees occur and as far south in the east as Pennsylvania and Illinois. In the west, it occurs as far south as southern Arizona and California.

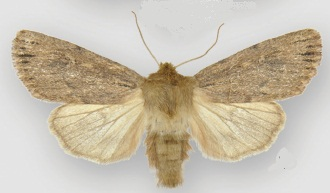
Ufeus satyricus sagittarius male

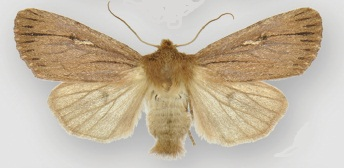
Ufeus satyricus sagittarius female

The length of the forewings is 15–22 mm for males and 19–24 mm for females. Adults emerge from the pupae in the summer and overwinter as adults, but they are mostly collected between late August and early May, even during mild spells in mid-winter. Most records are in October and November in the fall and March and April in the spring.

The larvae have been reported feeding on cottonwood.

== Subspecies ==
- Ufeus satyricus satyricus (from eastern North America westward to the foothills of the Rocky Mountains)
- Ufeus satyricus sagittarius Grote, 1883 (from the eastern edge of the Rocky Mountains in Alberta, Montana, and Colorado westward to the Pacific Coast)
