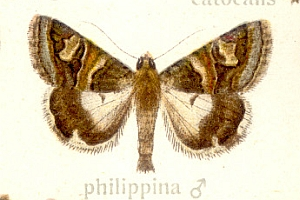

Scientific classification
- Domain: Eukaryota
- Kingdom: Animalia
- Phylum: Arthropoda
- Class: Insecta
- Order: Lepidoptera
- Superfamily: Noctuoidea
- Family: Erebidae
- Genus: Drasteria
- Species: D. philippina

Binomial name
- Drasteria philippina (Austaut, 1800)

Synonyms
- Leucanitis philippina Austaut, 1800

= Drasteria philippina =

Species of moth

Drasteria philippina is a moth of the family Erebidae. It is found on the Canary Islands, as well as in Morocco, Algeria, Libya, Egypt, Israel and Malta.
