= Drasteria flexuosa =

Scientific classification
- Kingdom: Animalia
- Phylum: Arthropoda
- Class: Insecta
- Order: Lepidoptera
- Superfamily: Noctuoidea
- Family: Erebidae
- Genus: Drasteria
- Species: D. flexuosa

Binomial name
- Drasteria flexuosa (Ménétries, 1847)

Synonyms
- Ophiusa flexuosa Ménétries, 1847; Ophiusa singularis Kollar, 1849; Thyria inepta Butler, 1881; Leucanitis flexuosa var. mongolica Staudinger, 1896; Leucanitis flexuosa var. caspica Staudinger, 1901

Species of moth

Drasteria flexuosa is a moth belonging to the Erebidae family, first described by Édouard Ménétries in 1847. It is found in the semi-deserts and deserts from eastern Egypt to Israel, Jordan, Syria, Kazakhstan, China, Mongolia, and Afghanistan.

There are two generations per year. Adults are on wing from February to May and October to November.

The larvae feed on the leaves of Alhagi sparsifolia.
