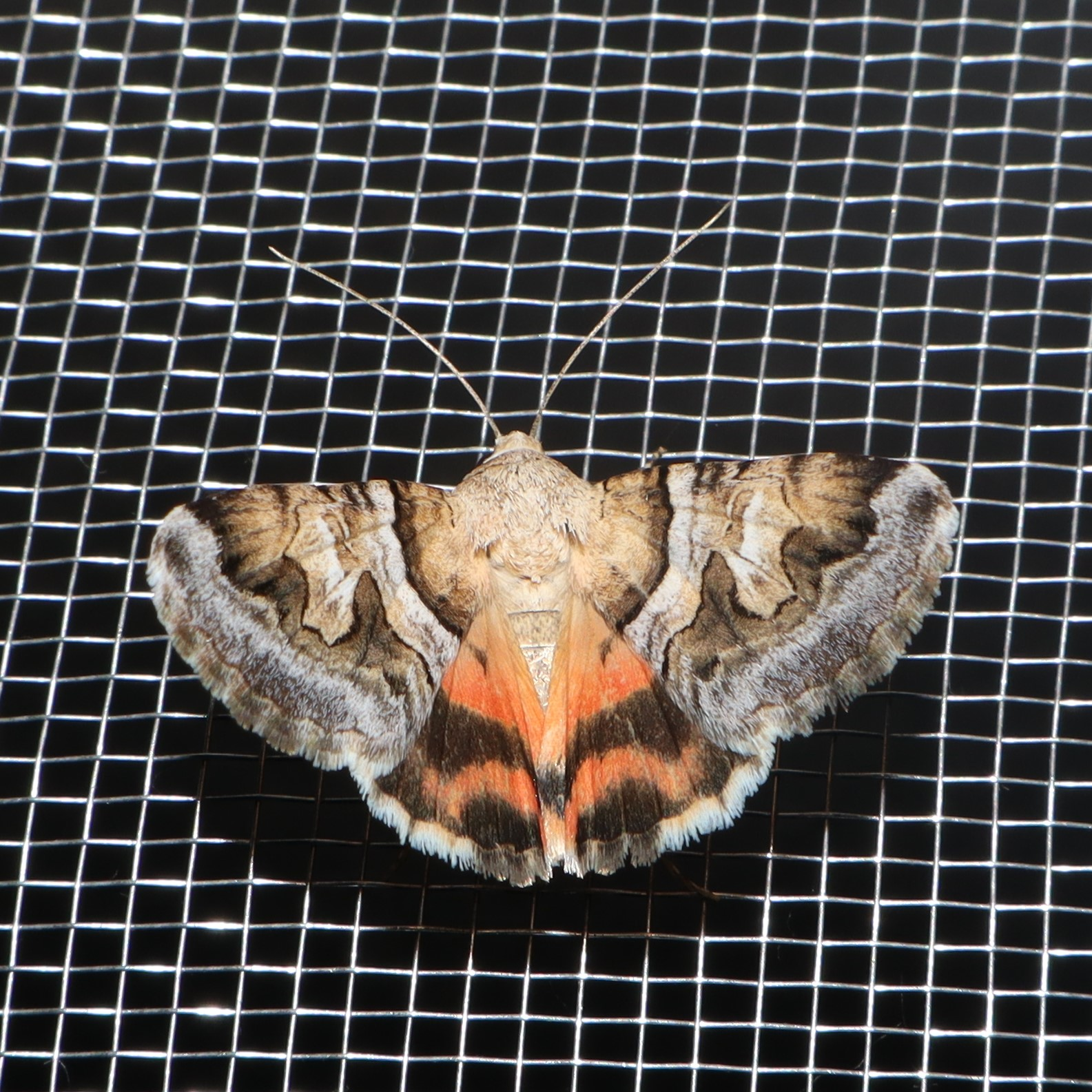

Scientific classification
- Kingdom: Animalia
- Phylum: Arthropoda
- Class: Insecta
- Order: Lepidoptera
- Superfamily: Noctuoidea
- Family: Erebidae
- Genus: Drasteria
- Species: D. howlandii

Binomial name
- Drasteria howlandii (Grote, 1865)

Synonyms
- Syneda howlandii Grote, 1864; Syneda exquisita Hampson, 1926; Synedoida howlandi Grote, 1864

= Drasteria howlandii =

Species of moth

Drasteria howlandii is a moth of the family Erebidae. It is found from British Columbia and Saskatchewan south through the western parts of the United States from Washington south to Arizona and Texas.

The wingspan is about 35 mm. Adults are on wing from March to September.

The larvae feed on Eriogonum species.
