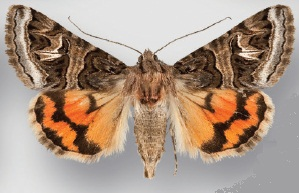
- Drasteria convergens

Scientific classification
- Kingdom: Animalia
- Phylum: Arthropoda
- Clade: Pancrustacea
- Class: Insecta
- Order: Lepidoptera
- Superfamily: Noctuoidea
- Family: Erebidae
- Tribe: Melipotini
- Genus: Drasteria; Hübner, 1818

Synonyms
- Aleucanitis Warren, 1913; Bolina Duponchel, 1845; Leucanitis Guenée, 1852; Syneda Guenée, 1852; Synedoida Edwards, 1878

= Drasteria =

Genus of moths

Drasteria is a genus of moths in the family Erebidae.

== Species ==
The genus includes the following species:

- Drasteria aberrans Staudinger, 1888
- Drasteria adumbrata Behr, 1870
- Drasteria antiqua Staudinger, 1889
- Drasteria austera John, 1921
- Drasteria axuana Püngeler, 1906
- Drasteria biformata H. Edwards, 1878
- Drasteria cailino Lefèbvre, 1827
- Drasteria cashmirensis Hampson, 1894
- Drasteria catocalis Staudinger, 1882
- Drasteria caucasica Kolenati, 1846
- Drasteria chinensis Alphéraky, 1892
- Drasteria coenobita (Kruger, 1939)
- Drasteria convergens Mustelin, 2006
- Drasteria divergens Behr, 1870
- Drasteria edwardsii Behr, 1870
- Drasteria eubapta Hampson, 1926
- Drasteria flexuosa Ménétriés, 1848
- Drasteria fumosa Strecker, 1898
- Drasteria grandirena Haworth, 1809
- Drasteria graphica Hübner, 1818
- Drasteria habibazel Dumont, 1922
- Drasteria hastingsii (Edwards, 1881)
- Drasteria herzi Alphéraky, 1895
- Drasteria howlandii Grote, 1864
- Drasteria hudsonica Grote & Robinson, 1865
- Drasteria hyblaeoides Moore, 1878
- Drasteria indecora John, 1910
- Drasteria inepta H. Edwards, 1881
- Drasteria ingeniculata Morrison, 1875
- Drasteria kabylaria Bang-Haas, 1906
- Drasteria kusnezovi John, 1910
- Drasteria langi Ershov, 1874
- Drasteria maculosa Behr, 1870
- Drasteria mirifica H. Edwards, 1878
- Drasteria mongoliensis Wiltshire, 1969
- Drasteria nephelostola Hampson, 1926
- Drasteria nubicola Behr, 1870
- Drasteria obscurata Staudinger, 1882
- Drasteria occulta H. Edwards, 1881
- Drasteria ochracea Behr, 1870
- Drasteria oranensis Rothschild, 1920
- Drasteria pallescens Grote & Robinson, 1866
- Drasteria pamira John, 1921
- Drasteria parallela Crabo & Mustelin, 2013
- Drasteria perplexa H. Edwards, 1884
- Drasteria petricola Walker, 1858
- Drasteria philippina Austaut, 1880
- Drasteria picta Christoph, 1877
- Drasteria pictoides Poole, 1989
- Drasteria pulchra Barnes & McDunnough, 1918
- Drasteria pulverosa Wiltshire, 1969
- Drasteria rada Boisduval, 1848
- Drasteria sabulosa H. Edwards, 1881
- Drasteria saisani Staudinger, 1882
- Drasteria scolopax Alphéraky, 1892
- Drasteria scrupulosa H. Edwards, 1878
- Drasteria sculpta Püngeler, 1904
- Drasteria sesquilina Staudinger, 1888
- Drasteria sesquistria Eversmann, 1854
- Drasteria sinuosa Staudinger, 1884
- Drasteria stretchii Behr, 1870
- Drasteria tejonica Behr, 1870
- Drasteria tenera Staudinger, 1877
- Drasteria walshi Metlevski, 2009
- Drasteria yerburii Butler, 1892

== Former species ==
- Drasteria albifasciata (Gaede, 1939)
- Drasteria albofasciata (John, 1917)
- Drasteria altivaga (Alphéraky, 1893)
- Drasteria chlorophis Herrich-Schäffer, 1869
- Drasteria judaica Hampson, 1926
- Drasteria nichollae (Hampson, 1926)
- Drasteria pica (Brandt, 1939)
- Drasteria stuebeli is now known as Anydrophila stuebeli Calberla, 1891
