= Drasteria sinuosa =

Scientific classification
- Domain: Eukaryota
- Kingdom: Animalia
- Phylum: Arthropoda
- Class: Insecta
- Order: Lepidoptera
- Superfamily: Noctuoidea
- Family: Erebidae
- Genus: Drasteria
- Species: D. sinuosa

Binomial name
- Drasteria sinuosa (Staudinger, 1884)

Synonyms
- Leucanitis sinuosa Staudinger, 1884

Species of moth

Drasteria sinuosa is a moth of the family Erebidae. It is found in Turkey, Iran, Kazakhstan, Tajikistan, Uzbekistan, Afghanistan and Turkmenistan.
