= Drasteria austera =

Scientific classification
- Domain: Eukaryota
- Kingdom: Animalia
- Phylum: Arthropoda
- Class: Insecta
- Order: Lepidoptera
- Superfamily: Noctuoidea
- Family: Erebidae
- Genus: Drasteria
- Species: D. austera

Binomial name
- Drasteria austera (John, 1917)

Synonyms
- Leucanitis austera John, 1917

Species of moth

Drasteria austera is a moth of the family Erebidae first described by Oscar John in 1917. It is found in Iran.
