= Drasteria inepta =

Inept drasteria

Scientific classification
- Kingdom: Animalia
- Phylum: Arthropoda
- Class: Insecta
- Order: Lepidoptera
- Superfamily: Noctuoidea
- Family: Erebidae
- Genus: Drasteria
- Species: D. inepta

Binomial name
- Drasteria inepta (H. Edwards, 1881)

Synonyms
- Synenoida inepta H. Edwards, 1881; Synenoida morbosa H. Edwards, 1881; Syneda violescens Hampson, 1926

Species of moth

Drasteria inepta, the inept drasteria, is a moth of the family Erebidae. It is found from Arizona to Texas, north to Colorado and Utah.

The wingspan is 35–43 mm. Adults are on wing from April to August.
