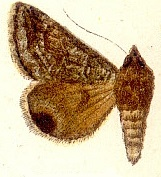

Scientific classification
- Domain: Eukaryota
- Kingdom: Animalia
- Phylum: Arthropoda
- Class: Insecta
- Order: Lepidoptera
- Superfamily: Noctuoidea
- Family: Erebidae
- Genus: Drasteria
- Species: D. tenera

Binomial name
- Drasteria tenera (Staudinger, 1877)

Synonyms
- Leucanitis tenera Staudinger, 1877

= Drasteria tenera =

Species of moth

Drasteria tenera is a moth of the family Erebidae. It is found in Russia, Kazakhstan, Kyrgyzstan and China (Tibet).
