= Drasteria scolopax =

Scientific classification
- Domain: Eukaryota
- Kingdom: Animalia
- Phylum: Arthropoda
- Class: Insecta
- Order: Lepidoptera
- Superfamily: Noctuoidea
- Family: Erebidae
- Genus: Drasteria
- Species: D. scolopax

Binomial name
- Drasteria scolopax (Alphéraky, 1892)

Synonyms
- Leucanitis scolopax Alphéraky, 1892

Species of moth

Drasteria scolopax is a moth of the family Erebidae. It is found in China (Tibet, Qinghai, Gansu) and Russia (Siberia).
