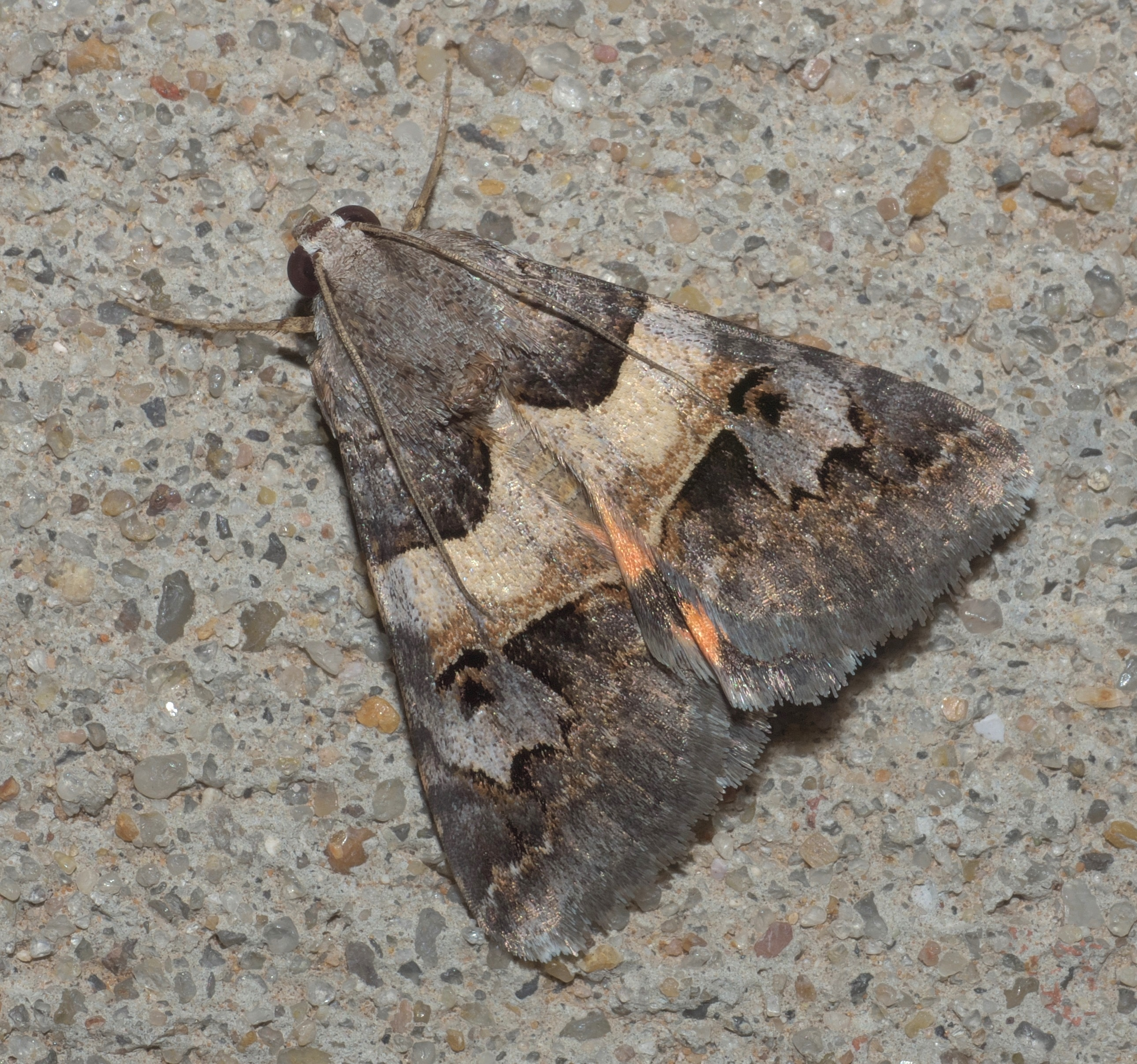
- Drasteria ingeniculata, Oklahoma

Scientific classification
- Domain: Eukaryota
- Kingdom: Animalia
- Phylum: Arthropoda
- Class: Insecta
- Order: Lepidoptera
- Superfamily: Noctuoidea
- Family: Erebidae
- Genus: Drasteria
- Species: D. ingeniculata

Binomial name
- Drasteria ingeniculata (Morrison, 1875)

Synonyms
- Syneda ingeniculata Morrison, 1875

= Drasteria ingeniculata =

Species of moth

Drasteria ingeniculata is a moth of the family Erebidae. It is found in south-central United States (Texas, Oklahoma, Kansas and Nebraska).

The wingspan is about 34 mm. Adults are on wing in spring and again in late summer. There are at least two generations per year.
