= Bruce Walsh =

American geneticist (born 1957)

- Born: James Bruce Walsh; 1957 (age 68–69)
- Education: University of California, Davis; University of Washington
- Scientific career
- Fields: Evolutionary genetics Quantitative genetics
- Institutions: University of Arizona
- Thesis: Theoretical models of speciation and graphical structure: the truth about stasipatric speciation and protection of alleles in linear stepping stone models (1983)
- Doctoral advisor: Joe Felsenstein

James Bruce Walsh (born 1957) is an American geneticist whose research focuses on evolutionary and quantitative genetics. He has been Professor of Ecology and Evolutionary Biology at the University of Arizona since 1986. He discovered the moth species Lithophane leeae in 2009, and another moth species, Drasteria walshi, is named after him.
