= Drasteria herzi =

Scientific classification
- Domain: Eukaryota
- Kingdom: Animalia
- Phylum: Arthropoda
- Class: Insecta
- Order: Lepidoptera
- Superfamily: Noctuoidea
- Family: Erebidae
- Genus: Drasteria
- Species: D. herzi

Binomial name
- Drasteria herzi (Alphéraky, 1895)

Synonyms
- Leucanitis herzi Alphéraky, 1895; Drasteria herzi angustifasciata Amsel, 1935; Syneda judaica Hampson, 1926

Species of moth

Drasteria herzi is a moth of the family Erebidae first described by Sergei Alphéraky in 1895. It is found in Transcaucasia, Turkmenistan, Khirgizia, Turkey, northern Iran, Israel, Jordan and Sanai.

There are two generations per year. Adults are on wing in from February to April and October to December.

== Subspecies ==
- Drasteria herzi herzi
- Drasteria herzi judaica (Hampson, 1926) (Israel)
