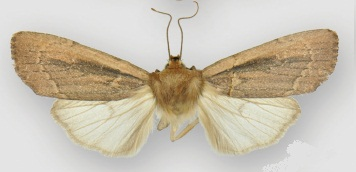
- Male
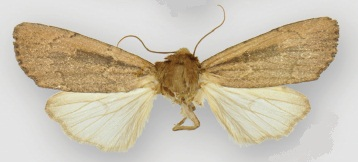
- Female

Scientific classification
- Domain: Eukaryota
- Kingdom: Animalia
- Phylum: Arthropoda
- Class: Insecta
- Order: Lepidoptera
- Superfamily: Noctuoidea
- Family: Noctuidae
- Genus: Ufeus
- Species: U. felsensteini

Binomial name
- Ufeus felsensteini Lafontaine & Walsh, 2013

= Ufeus felsensteini =

Species of moth

Ufeus felsensteini is a moth in the family Noctuidae. It is only known from the Santa Catalina Mountains in south-eastern Arizona.

The length of the forewings is 19–21 mm. The dorsal forewing is reddish brown with obscure maculation, except for slightly paler antemedial and postmedial lines. The hindwings are translucent white with a slight pearly-pink sheen. Adults emerge in the spring and overwinter, mainly flying during the winter months.

The larvae probably feed on cottonwood.

== Etymology ==
The species is named in honor of Professor Joseph Felsenstein, who pioneered modern statistical methods in the reconstruction of phylogenies.
