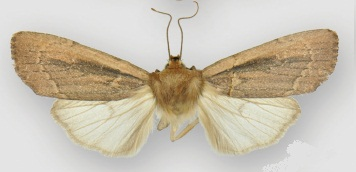
- Ufeus felsensteini, male

Scientific classification
- Kingdom: Animalia
- Phylum: Arthropoda
- Class: Insecta
- Order: Lepidoptera
- Superfamily: Noctuoidea
- Family: Noctuidae
- Subtribe: Ufeina
- Genus: Ufeus; Grote, 1873

= Ufeus =

Genus of moths

Ufeus is a genus of moths of the family Noctuidae.

== Species ==
- Ufeus carnea Hampson, 1912
- Ufeus faunus Strecker, 1898
- Ufeus felsensteini Lafontaine & Walsh, 2013
- Ufeus hulstii Smith, 1908
- Ufeus plicatus Grote, 1873 (syn: Ufeus unicolor Grote, 1878)
- Ufeus satyricus Grote, 1873 (syn: Ufeus barometricus (Goossens, 1881))
