= Drasteria pamira =

Scientific classification
- Domain: Eukaryota
- Kingdom: Animalia
- Phylum: Arthropoda
- Class: Insecta
- Order: Lepidoptera
- Superfamily: Noctuoidea
- Family: Erebidae
- Genus: Drasteria
- Species: D. pamira

Binomial name
- Drasteria pamira (John, 1917)

Synonyms
- Leucanitis pamira John, 1917

Species of moth

Drasteria pamira is a moth of the family Erebidae first described by Oscar John in 1917. It is found in Kyrgyzstan, Tajikistan and Afghanistan.
