= Drasteria aberrans =

Scientific classification
- Domain: Eukaryota
- Kingdom: Animalia
- Phylum: Arthropoda
- Class: Insecta
- Order: Lepidoptera
- Superfamily: Noctuoidea
- Family: Erebidae
- Genus: Drasteria
- Species: D. aberrans

Binomial name
- Drasteria aberrans (Staudinger, 1888)

Synonyms
- Leucanitis aberrans Staudinger, 1888

Species of moth

Drasteria aberrans is a moth of the family Erebidae. It is found in central Asia (Kyrghyzstan, Turkmenistan, Tajikistan, Uzbekistan, Mongolia and China (Xinjiang)).
