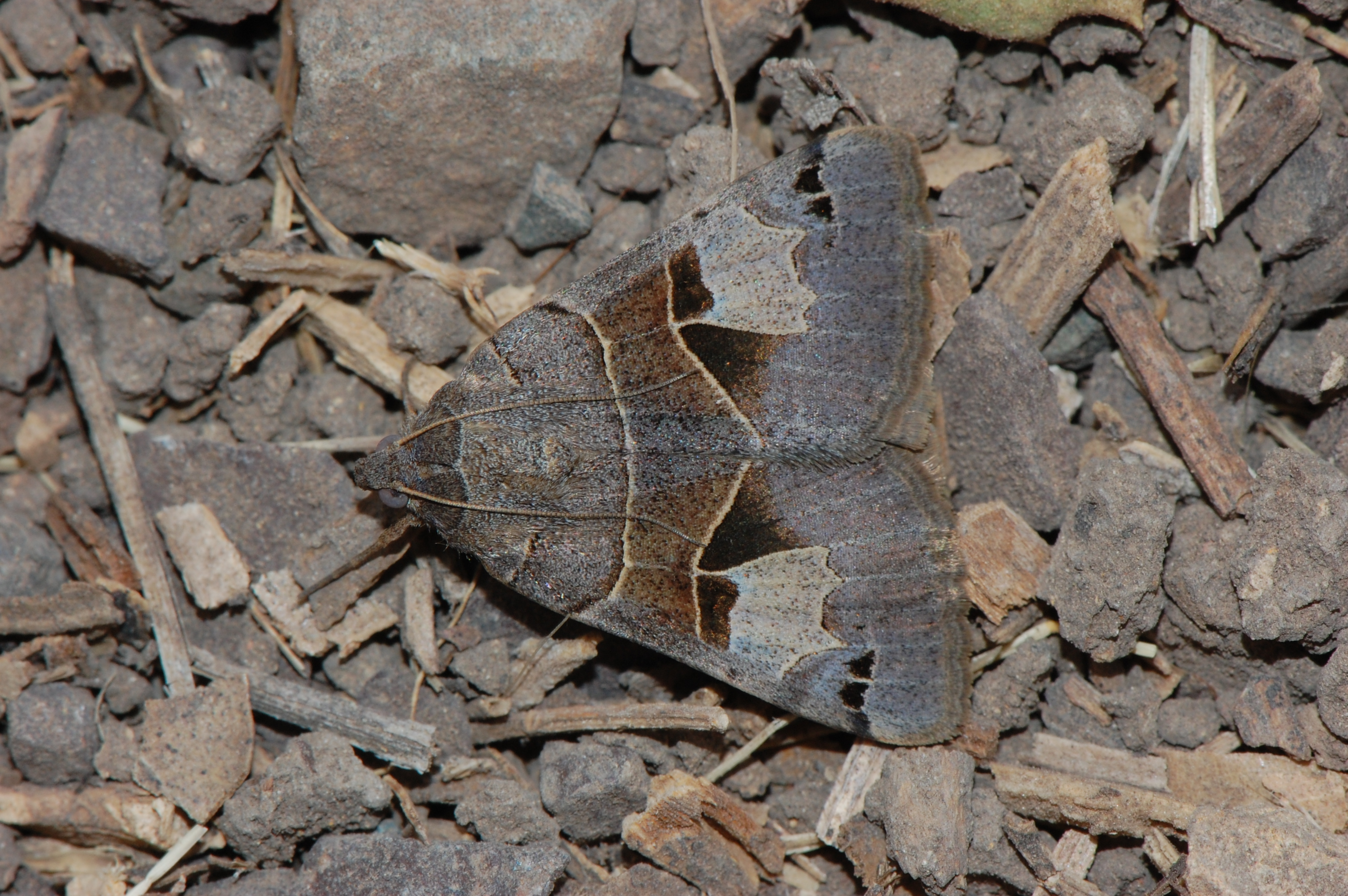

Scientific classification
- Domain: Eukaryota
- Kingdom: Animalia
- Phylum: Arthropoda
- Class: Insecta
- Order: Lepidoptera
- Superfamily: Noctuoidea
- Family: Erebidae
- Genus: Drasteria
- Species: D. edwardsii

Binomial name
- Drasteria edwardsii (Behr, 1870)

Synonyms
- Syneda edwardsii Behr, 1870; Synedoida edwardsi

= Drasteria edwardsii =

Species of moth

Drasteria edwardsii is a moth of the family Erebidae. It is found from Washington, through Oregon to California.

The wingspan is 34–37 mm.
