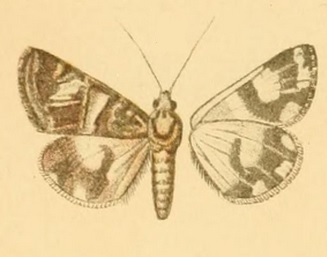

Scientific classification
- Domain: Eukaryota
- Kingdom: Animalia
- Phylum: Arthropoda
- Class: Insecta
- Order: Lepidoptera
- Superfamily: Noctuoidea
- Family: Erebidae
- Genus: Drasteria
- Species: D. picta

Binomial name
- Drasteria picta (Christoph, 1877)

Synonyms
- Leucanitis cailino var. picta Christoph, 1877; Leucanitis radapicata Staudinger, 1901

= Drasteria picta =

Species of moth

Drasteria picta is a moth of the family Erebidae first described by Hugo Theodor Christoph in 1877. It is found in Ukraine, Russia, Kazakhstan, southern Turkey, Syria, Armenia, Daghestan, Kyrgyzstan, Uzbekistan, Turkmenistan, Mongolia and China (Tibet, Qinghai).

The wingspan is 33–34 mm. Adults have been recorded on wing from April to July.

== Subspecies ==
- Drasteria picta picta
- Drasteria picta radapicata (Staudinger, 1901)
