= Drasteria nephelostola =

Scientific classification
- Kingdom: Animalia
- Phylum: Arthropoda
- Class: Insecta
- Order: Lepidoptera
- Superfamily: Noctuoidea
- Family: Erebidae
- Genus: Drasteria
- Species: D. nephelostola

Binomial name
- Drasteria nephelostola Hampson, 1926

Species of moth

Drasteria nephelostola is a moth of the family Erebidae. It is found in India (Jammu and Kashmir).
