= Drasteria sesquilina =

Scientific classification
- Domain: Eukaryota
- Kingdom: Animalia
- Phylum: Arthropoda
- Class: Insecta
- Order: Lepidoptera
- Superfamily: Noctuoidea
- Family: Erebidae
- Genus: Drasteria
- Species: D. sesquilina

Binomial name
- Drasteria sesquilina (Staudinger, 1888)

Synonyms
- Leucanitis sesquilina Staudinger, 1888; Leucanitis sequax Staudinger, 1901

Species of moth

Drasteria sesquilina is a moth of the family Erebidae. It is found in Turkey, Kyrgyzstan, Turkmenistan, Uzbekistan and Tajikistan.
