= Drasteria oranensis =

Scientific classification
- Domain: Eukaryota
- Kingdom: Animalia
- Phylum: Arthropoda
- Class: Insecta
- Order: Lepidoptera
- Superfamily: Noctuoidea
- Family: Erebidae
- Genus: Drasteria
- Species: D. oranensis

Binomial name
- Drasteria oranensis Rothschild, 1920

Species of moth

Drasteria oranensis is a moth of the family Erebidae first described by Rothschild in 1920. It is found from Algeria, to Libya, Egypt, Israel and Saudi Arabia.

There is probably one generation per year. Adults are on wing in from March to September depending on the location.

The larvae feed on Calligonum comosum.

== Subspecies ==
- Drasteria oranensis oranensis
- Drasteria oranensis arabica Wiltshire, 1990
