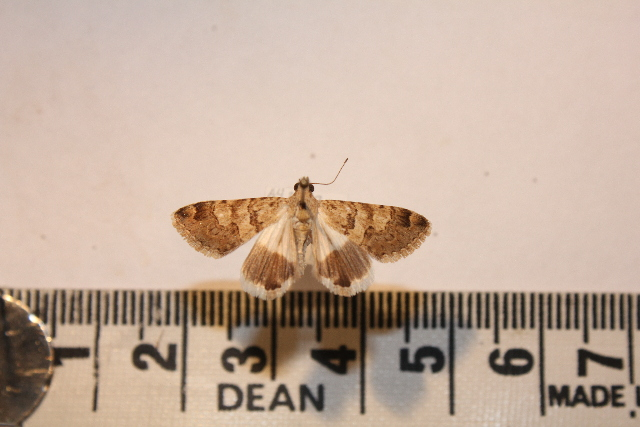

Scientific classification
- Kingdom: Animalia
- Phylum: Arthropoda
- Class: Insecta
- Order: Lepidoptera
- Superfamily: Noctuoidea
- Family: Erebidae
- Genus: Drasteria
- Species: D. pulverosa

Binomial name
- Drasteria pulverosa Wiltshire, 1969

= Drasteria pulverosa =

Species of moth

Drasteria pulverosa is a moth of the family Erebidae. It is found in Russia (Siberia, Tuva) and Mongolia.

== Subspecies ==
- Drasteria pulverosa pulverosa
- Drasteria pulverosa intermedia Ronkay, 1985 (southern Mongolia)
