= Drasteria chinensis =

Scientific classification
- Domain: Eukaryota
- Kingdom: Animalia
- Phylum: Arthropoda
- Class: Insecta
- Order: Lepidoptera
- Superfamily: Noctuoidea
- Family: Erebidae
- Genus: Drasteria
- Species: D. chinensis

Binomial name
- Drasteria chinensis (Alphéraky, 1892)

Synonyms
- Leucanitis chinensis Alphéraky, 1892

Species of moth

Drasteria chinensis is a moth of the family Erebidae. It is found in Kyrgyzstan, Kazakhstan, Mongolia and China (Gansu).
