= Drasteria biformata =

Scientific classification
- Domain: Eukaryota
- Kingdom: Animalia
- Phylum: Arthropoda
- Class: Insecta
- Order: Lepidoptera
- Superfamily: Noctuoidea
- Family: Erebidae
- Genus: Drasteria
- Species: D. biformata

Binomial name
- Drasteria biformata (H. Edwards, 1878)

Synonyms
- Synedoida biformata H. Edwards, 1878

Species of moth

Drasteria biformata is a moth of the family Erebidae. It is found in North America, where it has been recorded from Arizona and California.

The wingspan is 41–42 mm. Adults have been recorded on wing in January and from April to August.
