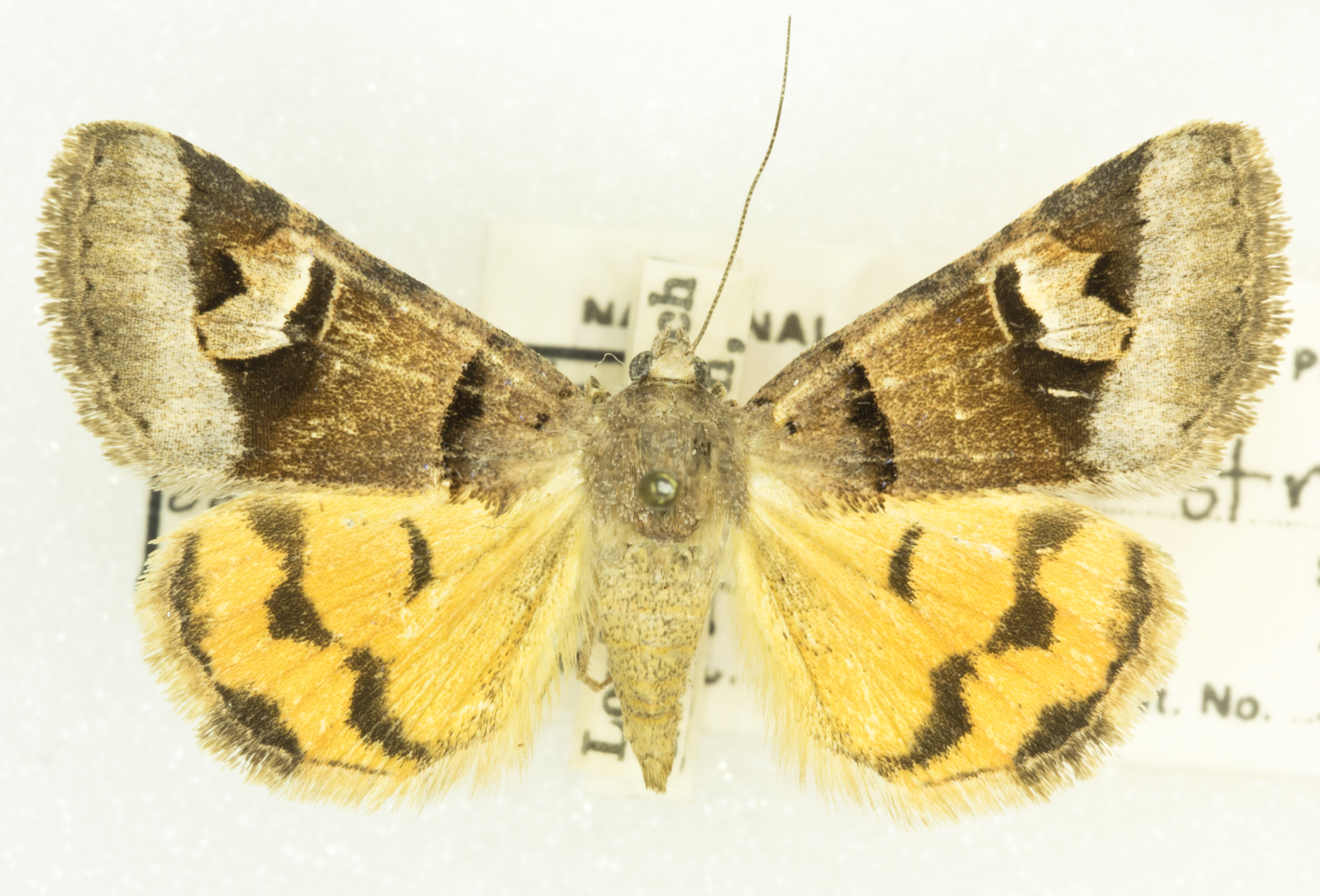

Scientific classification
- Domain: Eukaryota
- Kingdom: Animalia
- Phylum: Arthropoda
- Class: Insecta
- Order: Lepidoptera
- Superfamily: Noctuoidea
- Family: Erebidae
- Genus: Drasteria
- Species: D. perplexa

Binomial name
- Drasteria perplexa (H. Edwards, 1884)

Synonyms
- Syneda perplexa H. Edwards, 1884; Synedoida perplexa (H. Edwards, 1884)

= Drasteria perplexa =

Species of moth

Drasteria perplexa, the perplexing or perplexed arches, is a moth of the family Erebidae. The species was first described by Henry Edwards in 1884. It is found in North America from Alberta and Saskatchewan south to Colorado and Arizona.

The wingspan is 29– 33 mm. Adults are on wing from May to June.
