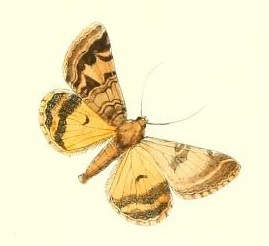

Scientific classification
- Domain: Eukaryota
- Kingdom: Animalia
- Phylum: Arthropoda
- Class: Insecta
- Order: Lepidoptera
- Superfamily: Noctuoidea
- Family: Erebidae
- Genus: Drasteria
- Species: D. langi

Binomial name
- Drasteria langi (Ershov, 1874)

Synonyms
- Syneda langi Ershov, 1874

= Drasteria langi =

Species of moth

Drasteria langi is a moth of the family Erebidae. It is found in Afghanistan, Kyrghyzstan, Kazakhstan and Tajikistan.
