= Drasteria kabylaria =

Scientific classification
- Kingdom: Animalia
- Phylum: Arthropoda
- Clade: Pancrustacea
- Class: Insecta
- Order: Lepidoptera
- Superfamily: Noctuoidea
- Family: Erebidae
- Genus: Drasteria
- Species: D. kabylaria

Binomial name
- Drasteria kabylaria (A. Bang-Haas, 1906)

Synonyms
- Leucanitis kabylaria A. Bang-Haas, 1906; Leucanitis cabylaria Hampson, 1913; Leucanitis columbina Brandt, 1941; Drasteria kabylaria columbina

Species of moth

Drasteria kabylaria is a moth of the family Erebidae first described by Andreas Bang-Haas in 1906. It is found from the western and central parts of the Sahara, to the Arabian Peninsula, Jordan, Sinai, south to Oman.

There are two generations per year. Adults are on wing in from March to May and October to November.

The larvae probably feed on Tamarix species.
