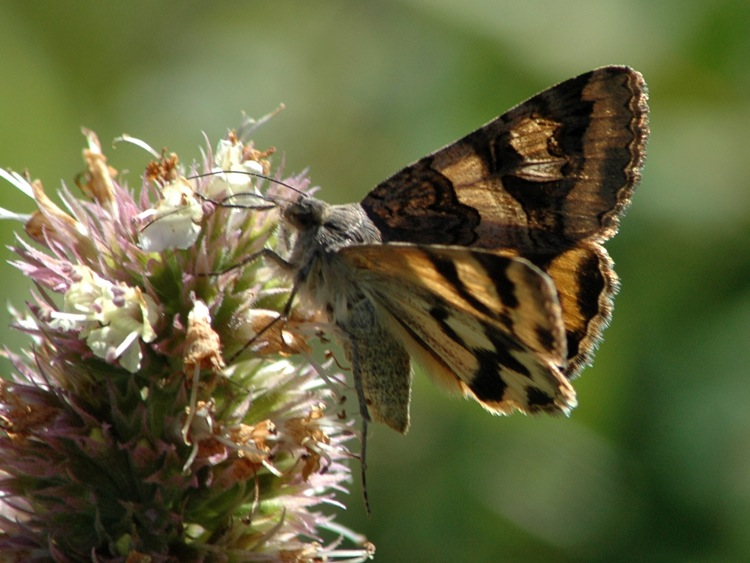

Scientific classification
- Domain: Eukaryota
- Kingdom: Animalia
- Phylum: Arthropoda
- Class: Insecta
- Order: Lepidoptera
- Superfamily: Noctuoidea
- Family: Erebidae
- Genus: Drasteria
- Species: D. divergens

Binomial name
- Drasteria divergens (Behr, 1870)

Synonyms
- Syneda divergens Behr, 1870; Syneda socia Behr, 1870; Synedoida divergens (Behr, 1870)

= Drasteria divergens =

Species of moth

Drasteria divergens is a moth of the family Erebidae. It is found from California to Colorado, north to British Columbia.

The wingspan is about 44 mm. Adults are on wing from March to August in California.
