= Michael Turelli =

American biologist

- Born: Brooklyn, New York
- Education: University of California, Riverside; University of Washington
- Known for: Research on Wolbachia
- Awards: Guggenheim Fellowship (1986); Fellow of the American Academy of Arts and Sciences (2005)
- Scientific career
- Fields: Population genetics Quantitative genetics Theoretical biology
- Institutions: University of California, Davis
- Thesis: Random Environments, Stochastic Calculus and Limiting Similarity (1977)
- Doctoral advisor: Joe Felsenstein

Michael Anthony Turelli is an American biologist who is Distinguished Professor of Genetics at the University of California, Davis. His research has focused on issues in quantitative genetics and on the Wolbachia genus of bacteria. Turelli has investigated the dynamics of polygenetic traits, maintenance of genetic variation, and most famously, the transformation of mosquito populations to suppress the spread of dengue and other human diseases. He was elected a fellow of the American Academy of Arts and Sciences in 2005 and to the National Academy of Sciences in 2021. He was a Guggenheim Fellow at University College London in 1986.
