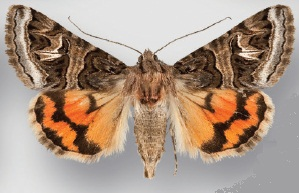
- Male

Scientific classification
- Domain: Eukaryota
- Kingdom: Animalia
- Phylum: Arthropoda
- Class: Insecta
- Order: Lepidoptera
- Superfamily: Noctuoidea
- Family: Erebidae
- Genus: Drasteria
- Species: D. convergens

Binomial name
- Drasteria convergens Mustelin, 2006

= Drasteria convergens =

Species of moth

Drasteria convergens is a moth of the family Erebidae. It was discovered in the San Bernardino Mountains in California.

The wingspan is about 42 millimetres (1.7 in).
