= Joseph Felsenstein =

American phylogeneticist (born 1942)

Joe Felsenstein
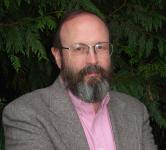
- Born: Joseph Felsenstein; May 9, 1942 (age 84)
- Education: University of Chicago
- Known for: PHYLIP; Felsenstein's tree-pruning algorithm
- Relatives: Lee Felsenstein (brother)
- Awards: Sewall Wright Award (1993); Weldon Memorial Prize (2000); Darwin–Wallace Medal (2008); John J. Carty award (2009); International Prize for Biology (2013)
- Scientific career
- Fields: Systematics; Phylogenetics; Population genetics Phylogenetic comparative methods
- Workplaces: University of Washington
- Thesis: Statistical Inference and the Estimation of Phylogenies (1968)
- Doctoral advisor: Richard Lewontin
- Notable students: Fred W. Allendorf; Michael Turelli; Bruce Walsh
- Website: www.gs.washington.edu/faculty/felsenstein.htm evolution.genetics.washington.edu/phylip/felsenstein.html

Joseph "Joe" Felsenstein (born May 9, 1942) is an American phylogeneticist and computational biologist, and a Professor Emeritus in the Departments of Genome Sciences and Biology at the University of Washington in Seattle. He is best known for his work on phylogenetic inference, and is the author of Inferring Phylogenies, and principal author and distributor of the package of phylogenetic inference programs called PHYLIP. Closely related to his work on phylogenetic inference is his introduction of methods for making statistically independent comparisons using phylogenies.

== Education ==
Felsenstein completed his undergraduate degree in 1964 at the University of Wisconsin–Madison, researching in the laboratory of James F. Crow. He completed a PhD at the University of Chicago in 1968, working under population genetics pioneer Richard Lewontin. He did a postdoc at the Institute of Animal Genetics in Edinburgh, then joined the faculty at the University of Washington in the Department of Genetics.

== Research ==
In addition to his work in phylogenetics, Felsenstein is also noted for highly influential work in theoretical population genetics, including work on natural selection, migration and gene flow, linkage, speciation, and coalescence models. Many of the research and statistical methods developed by Felsenstein have become major features and de facto standards in the field of phylogenomics. These include the use of Monte Carlo Markov chains for phylogenomic inference, applying Ronald Fisher's maximum likelihood to phylogenies rather than maximum parsimony, pruning algorightms, the phylogenetic boostrap, and foundational software packages such as PHYLIP and LAMARC.

His 1985 research paper on bootstrapping in phylogenetics is one of the most cited scientific articles of all time.

== Awards ==
Felsenstein is a member of the National Academy of Sciences. He was awarded the Darwin-Wallace Medal by the Linnean Society of London in 2008. In 2009 he was awarded the John J. Carty Award from the National Academy of Sciences. In 2013 he was awarded the International Prize for Biology by the Japan Society for the Promotion of Science. In 2026, he was awarded the Mendel Medal by The Genetics Society and elected a Fellow of the Royal Society.

The moth species Ufeus felsensteini was named in his honor.

== Personal life ==
Felsenstein is the older brother of early personal computer designer Lee Felsenstein.

An interview covering aspects of his academic career is part of the Distinguished Faculty Interview Series of the Department of Genome Sciences, University of Washington.
