= Drasteria mirifica =

Scientific classification
- Kingdom: Animalia
- Phylum: Arthropoda
- Clade: Pancrustacea
- Class: Insecta
- Order: Lepidoptera
- Superfamily: Noctuoidea
- Family: Erebidae
- Genus: Drasteria
- Species: D. mirifica

Binomial name
- Drasteria mirifica (H. Edwards, 1878)

Synonyms
- Syneda mirifica H. Edwards, 1878; Drasteria klotsi Richards, 1939

Species of moth

Drasteria mirifica is a moth of the family Erebidae. It is found in North America, including Nevada, Oregon and California.

The wingspan is about 30 mm.

== Subspecies ==
- Drasteria mirifica mirifica
- Drasteria mirifica klotsi Richards, 1939
