= Drasteria walshi =

Scientific classification
- Domain: Eukaryota
- Kingdom: Animalia
- Phylum: Arthropoda
- Class: Insecta
- Order: Lepidoptera
- Superfamily: Noctuoidea
- Family: Erebidae
- Genus: Drasteria
- Species: D. walshi

Binomial name
- Drasteria walshi Metlevski, 2009

Species of moth

Drasteria walshi is a moth of the family Erebidae. It is endemic to the Pinaleño Mountains and Chiricahua Mountains in southern Arizona. The length of the forewings is 19–23 mm. Adults are on wing from May to June.
