= Coleman Townsend Robinson =

American entomologist

Coleman Townsend Robinson (12 January 1838 – 1 May 1872) was an American entomologist who specialised in Lepidoptera.

He wrote Grote, A.R., & Robinson, C.T. 1867–1868. Descriptions of American Lepidoptera – Nos 1–3. Transactions of the American Entomological Society 1(1): 1–30; (2): 171–192, pl. 4; (4): 323–360, pl. 6, pl. 7 with Augustus Radcliffe Grote.
