= Sophronia orientalis =

Scientific classification
- Domain: Eukaryota
- Kingdom: Animalia
- Phylum: Arthropoda
- Class: Insecta
- Order: Lepidoptera
- Family: Gelechiidae
- Genus: Sophronia
- Species: S. orientalis

Binomial name
- Sophronia orientalis Li & Zheng, 1998

Species of moth

Sophronia orientalis is a moth of the family Gelechiidae. It is found in China (Shaanxi).

The wingspan is 12.5–15 mm. Adults are similar to Sophronia illustrella and Sophronia marginella, but can be distinguished by the male and female genitalia.
