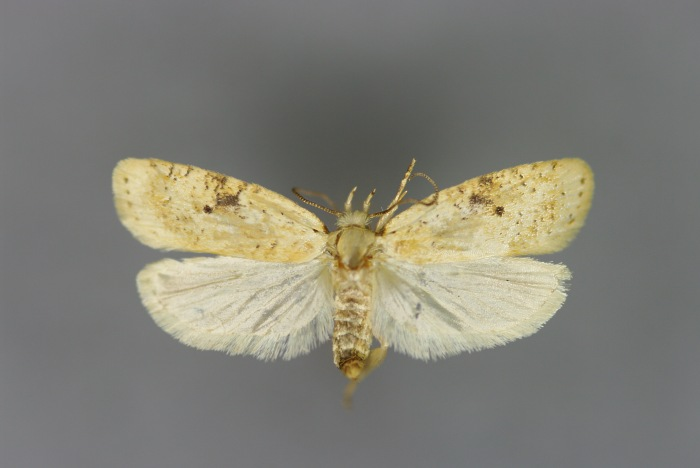
- Male
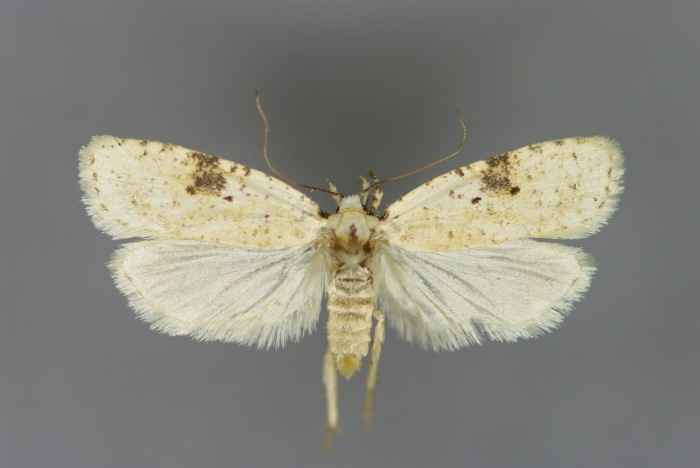
- Female

Scientific classification
- Kingdom: Animalia
- Phylum: Arthropoda
- Clade: Pancrustacea
- Class: Insecta
- Order: Lepidoptera
- Family: Depressariidae
- Genus: Agonopterix
- Species: A. petasitis

Binomial name
- Agonopterix petasitis (Standfuss, 1851)

Synonyms
- Depressaria petasitis Standfuss, 1851

= Agonopterix petasitis =

Species of moth

Agonopterix petasitis is a moth of the family Depressariidae. It is found in France, Germany, Poland, the Czech Republic, Slovakia, Austria, Switzerland, Italy, Hungary and Romania.

The larvae feed on Petasites hybridus.
