= Standfuss =

Standfuss or Standfuß is a surname. Notable people with the surname include:

- Max Standfuss, German-Swiss entomologist
- Stephan Standfuß (born 1972), German politician
