= Sie sagen all, du bist nicht schön =

Former regional anthem of East Prussia

English: They all say, that you aren't beautiful
- Regional anthem of East Prussia
- Lyrics: Johanna Ambrosius, 1884
- Music: Karl Anton Guske, Late 1880s
- Adopted: Late 1880s
- Relinquished: 1930s

Sie sagen all, du bist nicht schön (English: They all say you are not beautiful), originally known as Mein Heimatland (English: My Homeland), is a song written by Johanna Ambrosius in 1884, which served as the national anthem of East Prussia until it was replaced by Ostpreußenlied by Herbert Brust in the 1930s.

== Origin ==
The text was published in 1884 as the poem "Mein Heimatland". The poet Johanna Ambrosius, who said of herself: "I wanted to be nothing other than a farm labourer" (German: Ich wollte nichts anderes sein als eine Landarbeiterin), received both positive and negative reviews for her poem.

The poem was set to music by the teacher Karl Anton Guske. The song is also sung to the tune "Am Strand der grünen Spree".

After the song Ostpreußenlied was made, it quickly gained popularity and replaced Sie sagen all, du bist nicht schön as the national anthem of East Prussia.

== Lyrics ==
	German original	English translation
1.	Sie sagen all, du bist nicht schön mein trautes Heimatland; Du trägst nicht stolze Bergeshöh’n, nicht rebengrün Gewand; In deinen Lüften rauscht kein Aar, es grüßt kein Palmenbaum, doch glänzt der Vorzeit Träne klar an deiner Küste Saum.	They all say that you aren't beautiful My dear homeland You do not wear proud mountain heights, nor robed in green vines; In your breezes no eagles swish, no palm tree greets you, But the tears of the past shine clear On the edge of your coast.
2.	Und gibst dem König auch kein Erz, nicht Purpur, Diamant, klopft in Dir doch das treu’ste Herz, Fürs heil’ge Vaterland. Zum Kampfe lieferst du das Roß, wohl Tonnen Goldes wert, und Männer, stark zum Schlachtentroß, die kräft’ge Faust zum Schwert.	And you don't give the king ore, neither purple, nor diamond, But the most loyal heart beats within you, For the holy fatherland. To the battle thou shalt supply the steed, worth tonnes of gold, and men, strong for battle, the strong fist for the sword.
3.	Und wenn ich träumend oft durchgeh’ die düst’re Tannennacht und hoch die mächt’gen Eichen seh’ in königlicher Pracht, wenn rings erschallt am Memelstrand der Nachtigallen Lied und ob dem fernen Dünensand die weiße Möwe zieht.	And when I often go dreaming the gloomy fir-tree night And see the mighty oaks high in royal splendour, When all round the Memel beach the nightingales' song and above the distant dune sands the white seagull flies.
4.	Dann überkommt mich solche Lust, daß ich’s nicht sagen kann, ich sing’ ein Lied aus voller Brust, schlag froh die Saiten an. Und trägst Du auch nur schlicht Gewand und keine stolzen Höh’n: Ostpreußen hoch, mein Heimatland, Wie bist du wunderschön!	Then I am so overcome with lust, that I cannot say it, I sing a song at the top of my lungs, strike the strings with joy. And even if you only wear simple garments and no proud heights: East Prussia high, my homeland, How wonderful you are!

The second verse, coloured red, is almost never used, anywhere.
