= Sophronia albomarginata =

Scientific classification
- Domain: Eukaryota
- Kingdom: Animalia
- Phylum: Arthropoda
- Class: Insecta
- Order: Lepidoptera
- Family: Gelechiidae
- Genus: Sophronia
- Species: S. albomarginata

Binomial name
- Sophronia albomarginata Li & Zheng, 1998

Species of moth

Sophronia albomarginata is a moth of the family Gelechiidae. It is found in China (Shaanxi, Gansu).

The wingspan is 12.5–15 mm. Adults are similar to Sophronia humerella, but can be distinguished by indistinct short white lines at the apex of the forewings.
