= Sophronia finitimella =

Scientific classification
- Domain: Eukaryota
- Kingdom: Animalia
- Phylum: Arthropoda
- Class: Insecta
- Order: Lepidoptera
- Family: Gelechiidae
- Genus: Sophronia
- Species: S. finitimella

Binomial name
- Sophronia finitimella Rebel, 1905

Species of moth

Sophronia finitimella is a moth of the family Gelechiidae. It was described by Rebel in 1905. It is found in Asia Minor and Greece.

The wingspan is about 13 mm. Adults are similar to Sophronia acaudella.
