= Johanna Ambrosius =

German poet (1854–1939)

Johanna Ambrosius Voigt
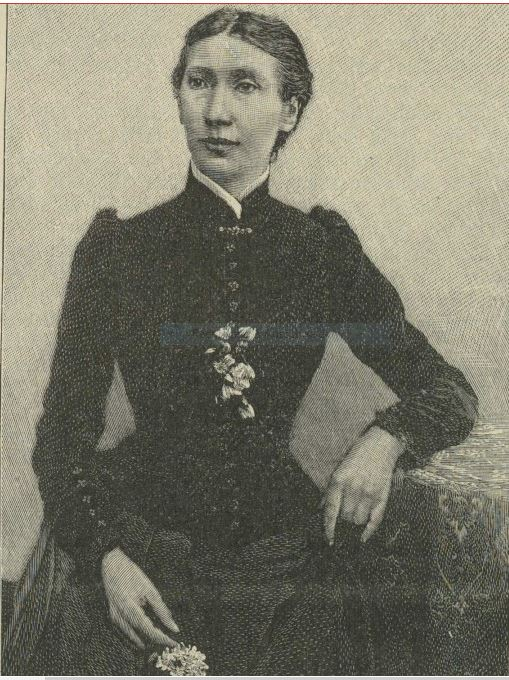
- Ambrosius in 1895
- Born: Johanna Ambrosius; 3 August 1854; Lengwethen, Province of Prussia
- Died: 27 February 1939 (aged 84); Königsberg, East Prussia
- Occupation: Author
- Spouse: Friedrich Wilhelm Voigt (m. 1875)
- Children: 2
- Writing career
- Genre: Poetry
- Notable work: "Mein Heimatland"

Signature
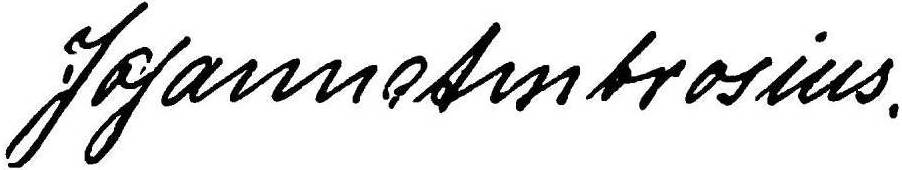

Johanna Ambrosius (also Johanna Voigt; 1854–1939) was a German poet. Born to a poor peasant family in East Prussia, she received little education and did not start writing poetry until around 1884. Her works were published in various magazines and she came to the attention of Austrian writer Karl Weiß who published a collection of her poems. Her fame peaked in the late 1890s and many of her poems were set to music.

== Life and family ==
Johanna Ambrosius was born on 3 August 1854 in Lengwethen, a village in East Prussia, the second of fourteen children of a craftsman. She grew up in poverty and attended the village school in Lengwethen until she was 11. From then on she helped her parents in the fields and in the house and was hired out as a maid and landlady to estates in the area.

In 1875, she married Friedrich Wilhelm Voigt, the son of a farmer, and moved with him to Dirwonuppen in Kreis Tilsit. They had two children, Marie (born 1875) and Erich (born 1878). In 1883, they acquired a small house with land in Groß Wersmeningken near Lasdehnen in Kreis Pillkallen. Friedrich Voigt died in the summer of 1900. Eight years later, her first child Marie died at the age of 32. Ambrosius followed her son Erich to Königsberg in 1908, where she lived until her death on 27 February 1939. Her grave is in the Neuen Luisenfriedhof (New Luisen Cemetery) in Königsberg (now Kaliningrad).

== Poetry ==
Ambrosius was writing her first poetry by 1884. Her sister Martha had sent some of her poems, without her knowledge, to several editors, among others to Anny Wothe, editor of the weekly magazine Von Haus zu Haus. Subsequently, various magazines published individual poems of hers. As a result, she came to the attention of Austrian writer Karl Weiß, who published a collection of her poems in December 1894.

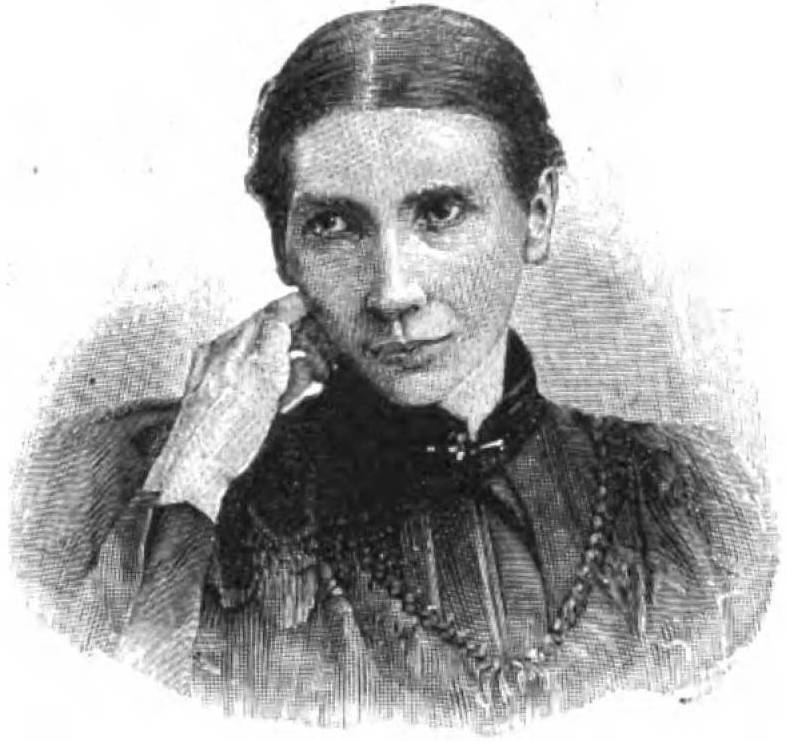
Ambrosius, c. 1899

Her poems had "an unusual success as form-oriented products of a woman coming from the most modest circumstances". and as early as 1904 were in their 41st edition. Her poems were accompanied by her portrait and a picture of her home from the seventh edition, published by Ferdinand Beyer in Königsberg. Some of her admirers visited her in Groß Wersmeningken. In 1896, the book of poems was translated into English and first published in the United States, where Ambrosius was celebrated as full of exuberance, even as a "German Sappho". A second book of poems followed in 1897. Her later poems appeared in journals and yearbooks, including Aus Höhen und Tiefen. Ein Jahrbuch für das deutsche Haus. She did not publish prose, apart from one short text.

Soon after her "discovery", Ambrosius became acquainted, personally and through exchanges of letters, with notable writers of her time including Hermann Sudermann, Gerhart Hauptmann, Herman Grimm, Bruno Wille, and Heinrich Hart. With the exception of some letters to Grimm, her correspondences have not survived. Her fame was short-lived and praise for her "unlearned" poetry was followed by criticism of the "Johanna Ambrosius hype". Participating in the debate over the merits of Ambrosius's work were Carl Busse, Theodor Fontane, Richard Weitbrecht, Ferdinand Avenarius, Otto Rühle, Arno Holz, Ludwig Goldstein, and Christian Morgenstern.

She herself wrote about her authorship:

I don't know any rules of poetry and even if I would know them it would be impossible for me to write poetry according to them, I write only according to my feeling.

— Johanna Ambrosius (1905)

Ambrosius's best-known work was the 1884 poem "Mein Heimatland" with the opening line "They say all, you are not beautiful", which became famous as the Älteres/Erstes Ostpreußenlied (Older/First East Prussian Song). Her poems were set to music at least 90 times, among others by Heinrich Schenker and Felix Rosenthal. Her estate was lost when the Voigt family fled Königsberg in early 1945.

== Works ==
- Johanna Ambrosius, eine deutsche Volksdichterin. Gedichte (1894)
- Gedichte, 2nd part (1897)
