= Volksbühne =

Theater in Berlin, Germany

Coordinates: 52°31′37″N 13°24′43″E

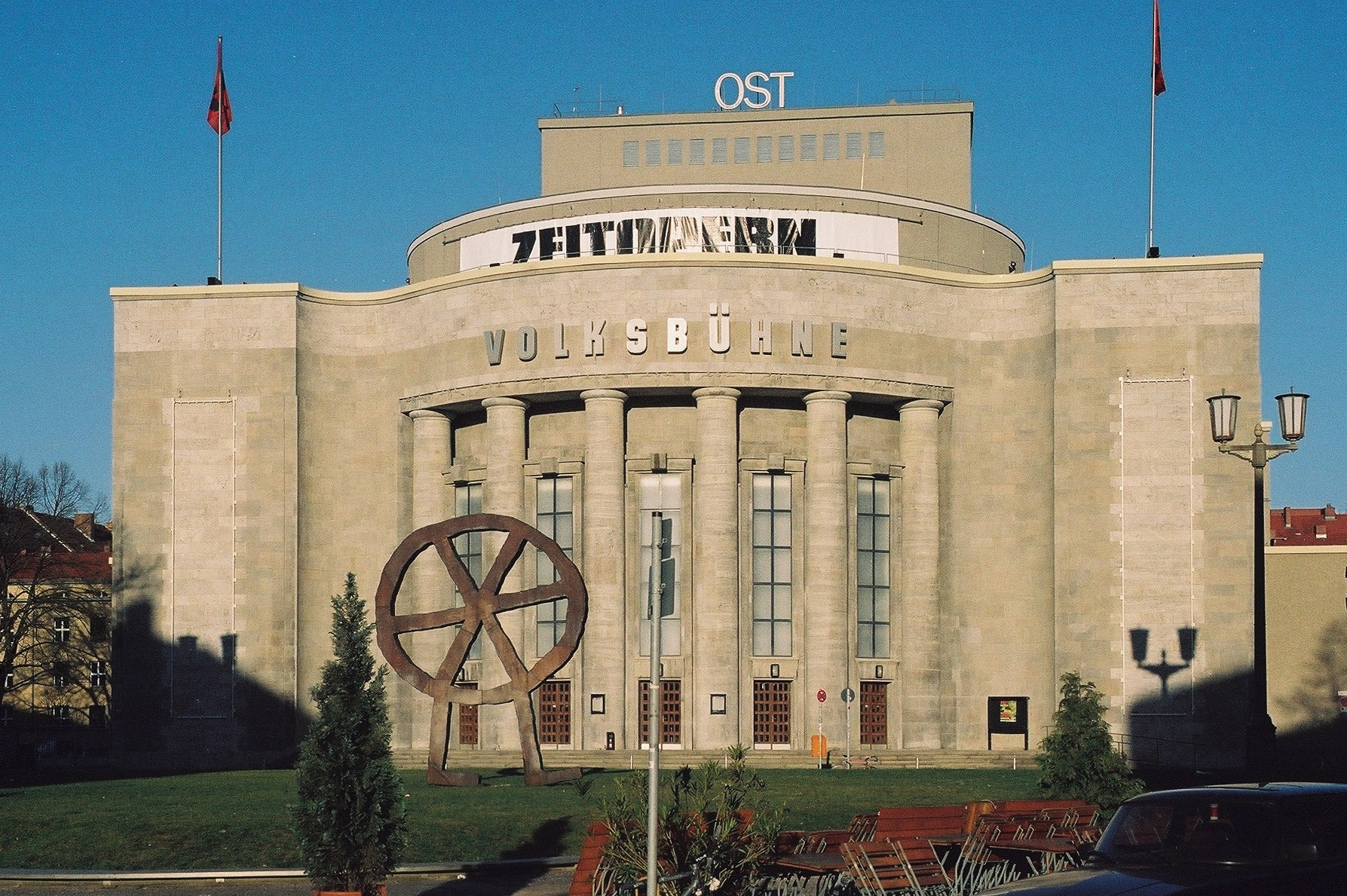
- View of the Volksbühne on Rosa-Luxemburg-Platz, 2008
- Interactive map of Volksbühne
- Address: Linienstraße 227; D-10178 Berlin; Germany
- Type: Theater

Website
- volksbuehne.berlin

The Volksbühne ("People's Theatre") is a theater in Berlin. Located in Berlin's city center Mitte on Rosa-Luxemburg-Platz (Rosa Luxemburg Square) in what was the GDR's capital. It has been called Berlin's most iconic theatre.

== History ==
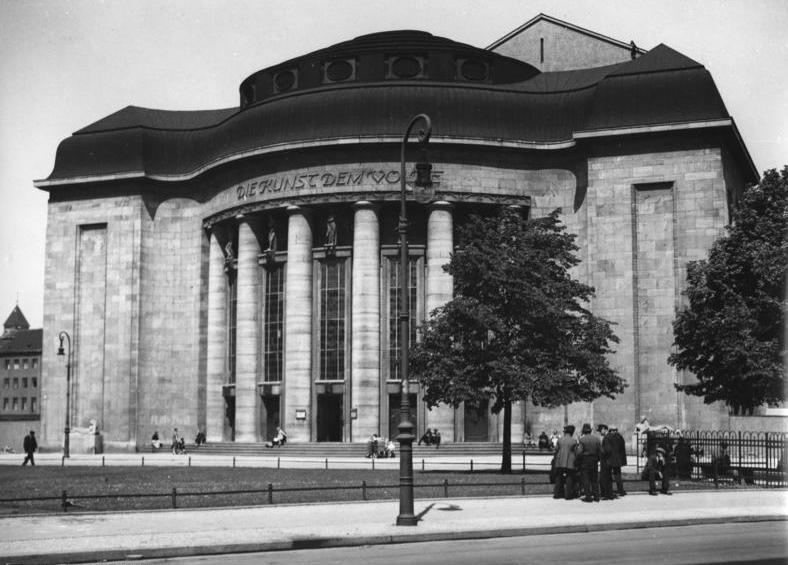
The original Volksbühne building in 1930

The Volksbühne was built during the years 1913 to 1914 and was designed by Oskar Kaufmann, with integrated sculpture by Franz Metzner, who had both previously collaborated on the Ufa-Pavillon am Nollendorfplatz cinema in 1912–1913. It opened on December 30, 1914 and has its origin in an organization known as the "Freie Volksbühne" ("Free People's Theater") founded in 1890 by Bruno Wille and Wilhelm Bölsche, which sketched out the vision for a theatre "of the people" in 1892. The goal of the organization was to promote the naturalist plays of the day at prices accessible to the common worker. The original slogan inscribed on the edifice was "Die Kunst dem Volke" ("The art to the people"). Two of the earlier artistic directors were the innovative Max Reinhardt from 1915 to 1918, and during the Weimar Republic the socio-political theatre reformer Erwin Piscator in 1924–1927.

During World War II, the theatre was heavily damaged like much of the rest of Berlin. From 1950 to 1954, it was rebuilt according to the designs of architect Hans Richter.

Frank Castorf became director in 1992. During his 25-year tenure, through mid 2017, the theater's ambitious, experimental productions, brought it worldwide recognition as a leading European venue.

=== 21st century ===
In 2015, the City of Berlin announced that Castorf would be replaced by Chris Dercon in 2017. The following September, left-wing activists occupied the theater, protesting the Volksbühne's new programmatic direction. As a result, Dercon resigned in April 2018 after what was considered by many to have been a commercially and artistically weak period for the theater.

Afterward, Klaus Dörr temporarily took over the leadership of the Volksbühne, intending to serve for an interim period. On March 15, 2021, Berlin’s Senator for Culture, Klaus Lederer, and Klaus Dörr mutually agreed to end his tenure.

René Pollesch, a playwright and director considered to be one of the leading and most influential voices of post-dramatic theatre in Germany, assumed the position of Artistic Director of the Volksbühne in 2021. Pollesch died unexpectedly in February 2024.

After a year-long search, Berlin's government announced Matthias Lilienthal as the Volksbühne's new artistic director in February 2025, joined by an artistic board of choreographers Florentina Holzinger and Marlene Monteiro Freitas. Lilienthal, who worked as chief dramaturg at the Volksbühne between 1991 and 1998 under Frank Castorf, previously led the HAU - Hebbel am Ufer and the Münchner Kammerspiele. The new leadership team will begin their tenure in August 2026.
