= Sophronia curonella =

Scientific classification
- Kingdom: Animalia
- Phylum: Arthropoda
- Clade: Pancrustacea
- Class: Insecta
- Order: Lepidoptera
- Family: Gelechiidae
- Genus: Sophronia
- Species: S. curonella

Binomial name
- Sophronia curonella Standfuss, 1884

Species of moth

Sophronia curonella is a moth of the family Gelechiidae. It was described by Max Standfuss in 1884. It is found in the Apennines in Italy.

The wingspan is about 9 mm. The forewings are dark brown with a white stripe. The hindwings are dark grey.
