= Wilhelm Bölsche =

German author, editor and publicist

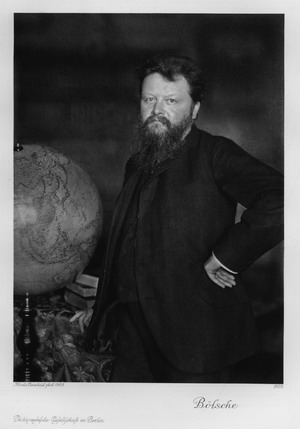
Wilhelm Bölsche

Wilhelm Bölsche (2 January 1861 – 30 August 1939) was a German author, editor and publicist. He was among the early promoters of nature conservation and committed to popularizing science.

== Life ==
Bölsche was born in Cologne on 2 January 1861, son of journalist Carl Bölsche (16 March 1813 – 14 April 1891) long-time editor of the Kölnische Zeitung. As a secondary school student, Bölsche wrote essays on natural history for magazines such as "Die Gefiederte Welt" or "Isis". He studied from 1883 to 1885 philosophy, art history and archaeology at the University of Bonn. He did not complete studies of classical philology in Bonn, but in their course he traveled to Rome and Florence, then to Paris.

Deciding that he could make writing his career, he moved to Berlin in the fall of 1886, financially supported by his parents. In Berlin-Friedrichshagen he became a central figure in the "Friedrichshagener Dichterkreis", which was an association of writers of naturalism, holding their first meetings in 1888/89 in the houses of Wilhelm Bölsche and Bruno Wille in Friedrichshagen am Müggelsee (now in the Berlin district of Treptow-Köpenick). This circle of friends would visit Erkner, where they sought the tranquility of the Brandenburg landscape near the cosmopolitan city of Berlin. The group became known enough for several Scandinavians to join it. The goal of this group of literati and intellectuals who settled around 1890 in Friedrichshagen, like of may other groups of that type sprouting up at that time, was social reform (German: Lebensreform) that promoted a bohemian, "natural" way of life as a response to industrialization and urbanization, a world view of life reform basically containing a secularized Gnostic-eschatological salvation doctrine (salvation through a "natural way of life").

Through Rudolf Lenz (1863–1938) and Bruno Wille Bölsche came into contact with the literary association "Durch!".

Although most of his work covers natural history topics, Bölsche was not a trained naturalist, but an enthusiastic popularizer of the natural sciences. He was a friend of the biologist Ernst Haeckel and was an early conservationist. His publication of Das Liebesleben in der Natur ("The Love Life in Nature") in 1898 was the key for creating modern fact books in Germany. Boelsche also initiated with Wilhelm Schwaner (1863–1944) a prequel of the first German folk high school, the "Freie Hochschule Berlin" in 1902 and was an important instigator for the "Lebensreformbewegung" (Humanistic naturalism – key note: "Back to Nature") in Germany. In 1890 he and Bruno Wille founded the "Freie Volksbühne", which was intended as a workers' theater promoting the naturalist plays of the day. He also edited the most important cultural history review of the day, "Freie Bühne" (Free Stage) and popularized his free-thinking monism knowledge, based on the thoughts of Charles Darwin and Ernst Haeckel, in dozens of self-edited books and series released by Kosmos-Verlag in Stuttgart collaborating with the Berlin artist Heinrich Harder.

His friendship with the Hauptmann brothers, Gerhart Hauptmann and Carl, brought Bölsche to Schreiberhau in the Giant Mountains, where he would spend the summer regularly, starting in 1901, making his permanent residence there in 1918. He continued to devote himself to his literary work and his extensive correspondence until old age.

== Personal life ==
Wilhelm Bölsche was first married in Berlin in 1892 to Adele Bertelt (1860–1942), but they divorced in 1895. He remarried in 1897 in Cologne to Johanna Walther (1863–1923), a childhood friend (sister of architect Julius Wilhelm Walther, daughter of civil engineer and later factory manager Wilhelm Heinrich Walther and Augusta Alwina te Kloot). The couple had three children: Ernst Wilhelm Julius (1898–1899), Karl Erich Bruno (1899–1977) and Johanna Alwine Elisabeth (1900–35). Wilhelm Bölsche died in Schreiberhau (now southern Poland) on 31 August 1939 and was interred at the evangelical cemetery of Nieder-Schreiberhau in Dept. F 3 next to his wife Johanna.

== Honours ==
As a compliment to his work, Boelsche was the name giver to a mountain ridge in the "Riesengebirge" (Karkonosze Mountains), to a Berlin school (Realschule Bölsche – Oberschule), and to many streets in German towns, including the "Bölschestrasse" in his former living district Berlin-Friedrichshagen. Even an asteroid was named after him – "1998 FC127" now bearing the name 17821 Bölsche moving between Mars and Jupiter towards the sun.

== Work (selective) ==
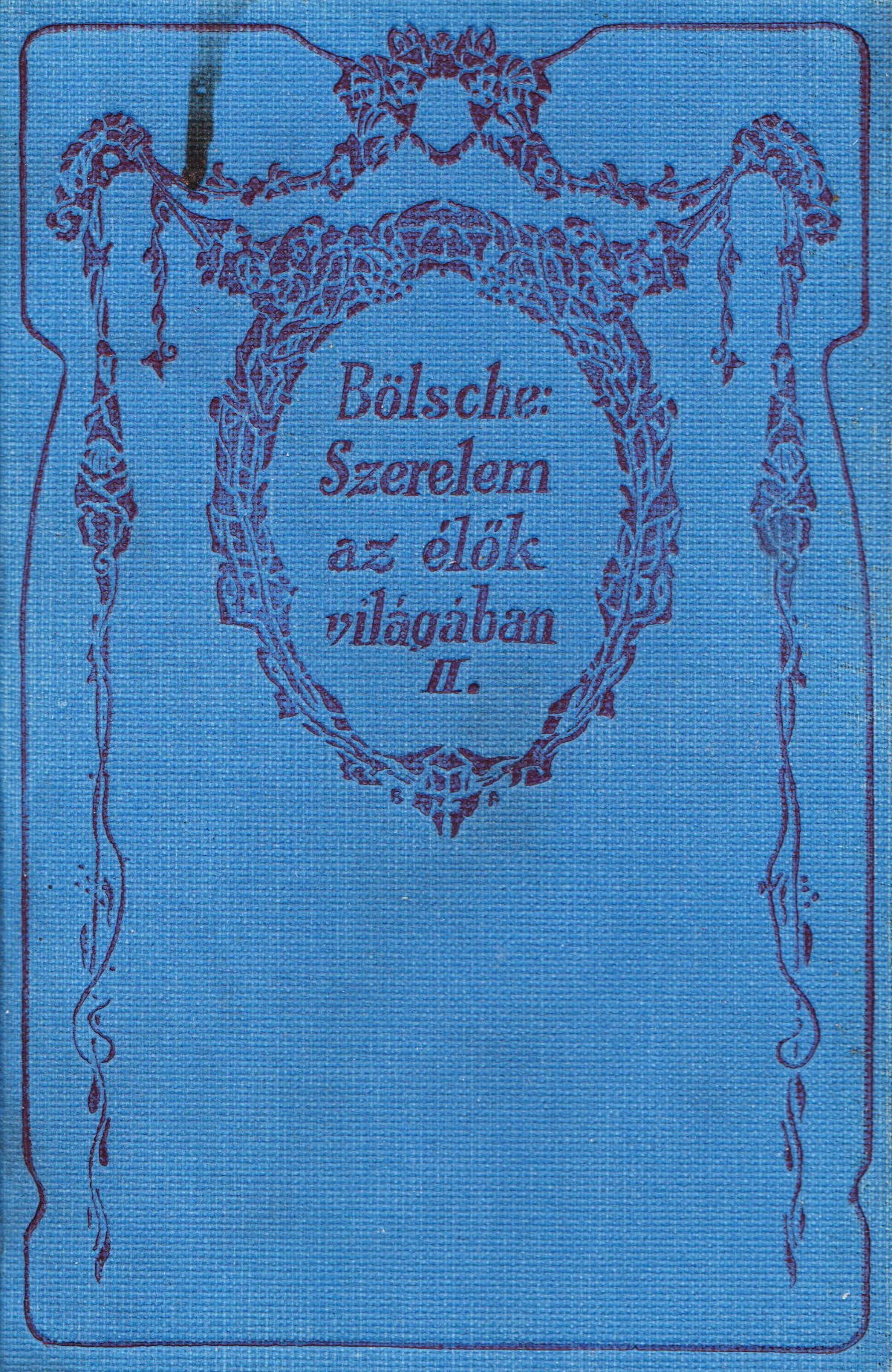
Love in the world of the living (Hungarian edition)

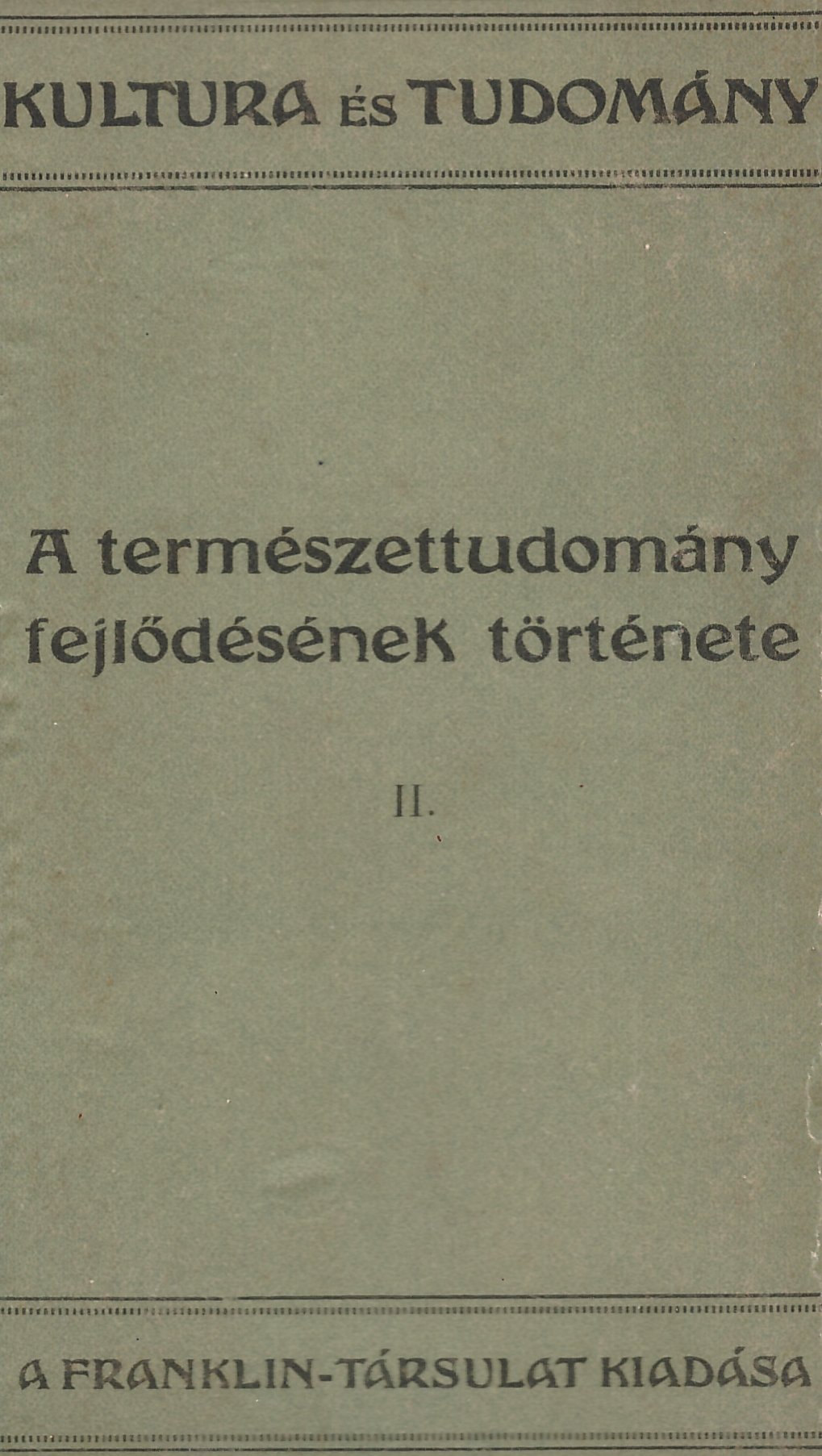
History of the development of science (Hungarian edition)

- Paulus. Roman aus der Zeit des Kaisers Marcus Aurelius, 2 Bde., 1885
- Der Zauber des Königs Arpus, Roman, 1887
- Die naturwissenschaftlichen Grundlagen der Poesie. Prolegomena einer realistischen Ästhetik, 1887
- Heinrich Heine. Versuch einer ästhetisch-kritischen Analyse seiner Werke und seiner Weltanschauung, 1888
- Die Poesie der Großstadt, 1890
- Die Mittagsgöttin, 3 Bde., Roman, 1891
- Freireligiöse Neujahrsgedanken. Festvortrag, gehalten am 1. Januar 1893 in der Freireligiösen Gemeinde zu Berlin, 1893
- Entwicklungsgeschichte der Natur, 2 Bde., 1894-1896
- Das Liebesleben in der Natur, 1898 - 1902
- Ernst Haeckel. Ein Lebensbild, 1900
- Die Entwicklungslehre (Darwinismus), 1900
- Vom Bazillus zum Affenmenschen. Naturwissenschaftliche Plaudereien, 1900
- Goethe im zwanzigsten Jahrhundert. Ein Vortrag, 1900
- Hinter der Weltstadt. Friedrichshagener Gedanken zur ästhetischen Kultur, 1901
- Die Eroberung des Menschen, 1901
- Die Entwicklungslehre im 19. Jahrhundert, 1901
- Von Sonnen und Sonnenstäubchen. Kosmische Wanderungen, 1903
- Aus der Schneegrube. Gedanken zur Naturforschung, 1903
- Het Menschenraadsel, 1904
- Die Abstammung des Menschen 1904
- Weltblick. Gedanken zu Natur und Kunst, 1904
- Naturgeheimnis, 1905
- Der Sieg des Lebens, 1905
- Die Schöpfungstage. Umrisse zu einer Entwicklungsgeschichte der Natur, 1906
- Im Steinkohlenwald, 1906
- Was ist die Natur?, 1907 (Illustration: Marie Gey-Heinze)
- Auf den Spuren der tropischen Eiszeit, 1907
- Tierbuch (Illustration: Heinrich Harder)
  - Bd. 1: 1908
  - Bd. 2: Das Pferd und seine Geschichte, 1909
  - Bd. 3: Der Hirsch und seine Geschichte, 1911
- Darwin, seine Bedeutung im Ringen um Weltanschauung und Lebenswert. 6 Aufsätze, 1909
- Der Mensch in der Tertiärzeit und im Diluvium, 1909
- Auf dem Menschenstern. Gedanken zu Natur und Kunst, 1909
- Tiere der Urwelt, 1910 (Illustration: Heinrich Harder)
- Komet und Weltuntergang, 1910
- Stunden im All, 1910
- Festländer und Meere im Wechsel der Zeiten, 1913
- Stirb und Werde! Naturwissenschaftliche und kulturelle Plaudereien, 1913
- Tierwanderungen in der Urwelt, 1914 (Illustration: Heinrich Harder)
- Von Wundern und Tieren. Neue naturwiss. Plaudereien, 1915
- Der Stammbaum der Insekten, 1916
- Schutz- und Trutzbündnisse in der Natur, 1917
- Eiszeit und Klimawechsel, 1919
- Naturphilosophische Plaudereien, 1920
- Tierseele und Menschenseele, 1924
- Erwanderte deutsche Geologie. Die Sächsische Schweiz, 1925
- Von Drachen und Zauberküsten. Abenteuer aus dem Kampf mit dem Unbekannten in der Natur, 1925
- Die Abstammung der Kunst, 1926
- Im Bernsteinwald, 1927
- Drachen. Sage und Naturwissenschaft. Eine volkstümliche Darstellung, 1929
- Der Termitenstaat. Schilderung eines geheimnisvollen Volkes, 1931
- Das Leben der Urwelt: Aus den Tagen der großen Saurier, 1932
- Was muß der neue deutsche Mensch von Naturwissenschaft und Religion fordern. Vortrag, 1934

=== Editor ===
- Christoph Martin Wielands ausgewählte Werke, 4 Bde., 1902
- Novalis. Ausgewählte Werke, 3 Bde., 1903
- Des Angelus Silesius Cherubinischer Wandersmann, 1905

== Literature ==
- Antoon Berentsen: Vom Urnebel zum Zukunftsstaat. Zum Problem der Popularisierung der Naturwissenschaften in der deutschen Literatur (1880–1910). Berlin: Oberhofer. 1986. (= Studien zu deutscher Vergangenheit und Gegenwart; 2) ISBN 3-925410-02-3
- Andreas W. Daum, Wissenschaftspopularisierung im 19. Jahrhundert: Bürgerliche Kultur, naturwissenschaftliche Bildung und die deutsche Öffentlichkeit, 1848–1914. Munich: Oldenbourg, 1998, ISBN 3-486-56337-8.
- Wolfram Hamacher: Wissenschaft, Literatur und Sinnfindung im 19. Jahrhundert. Studien zu Wilhelm Bölsche. Würzburg: Königshausen und Neumann. 1993. (= Epistemata; Reihe Literaturwissenschaft; 99) ISBN 3-88479-775-1
- Rolf Lang: Wilhelm Bölsche und Friedrichshagen. Auf dem „Mußweg der Liebhaberei". Frankfurt an der Oder: Kleist-Gedenk- u. Forschungsstätte. 1992. (= Frankfurter Buntbücher; 6)
- Rudolf Magnus: Wilhelm Bölsche – ein biographisch-kritischer Beitrag zur modernen Weltanschauung. Berlin. 1909.
- Ernst Haeckel – Wilhelm Bölsche Briefwechsel 1887–1919. Ed. by Rosemarie Nöthlich. (Ernst-Haeckelhaus-Studien Bd. 6.1)
