= Sophronia teretracma =

Scientific classification
- Kingdom: Animalia
- Phylum: Arthropoda
- Class: Insecta
- Order: Lepidoptera
- Family: Gelechiidae
- Genus: Sophronia
- Species: S. teretracma

Binomial name
- Sophronia teretracma Meyrick, 1927

Species of moth

Sophronia teretracma is a moth of the family Gelechiidae. It was described by Edward Meyrick in 1927. It is found in North America, where it has been recorded from Texas.

The wingspan is 18–21 mm. The forewings are gray, sometimes brownish tinged in the disc, closely speckled with white, more or less sprinkled with dark gray or blackish, in females sometimes more or less suffused with white. The upper and posterior margins of the cell are more or less marked with blackish, and veins 6 and 7 are marked with black lines except towards the apex. There is a faint acutely angulated whitish shade traversing the wing from two-thirds of the costa to the tornus and there is a small black apical dot preceded by brownish-ocherous suffusion on the costa. The hindwings are grey.
