= Mirosław Graf =

Polish ski jumper

Personal information
- Nationality: Poland
- Born: 5 June 1959 (age 67)

Sport
- Sport: Skiing

Mirosław Graf (born 5 June 1959) is a Polish former ski jumper, inventor of V-style.

== Career ==
He began his career in 1969 in Szklarska Poręba, from 1974 he performed in Karpacz and latterly in Zakopane from 1980-82.

In 1969 he suffered an injury fracturing his ribs and suffering ankle sprain. After this he began to use his skis in a V shape. His coaches tried to help him unlearn this style, recommending he ski with his feet inward and placed special "jaws" on his ski binding. However, Graf found that he performed longer distances and safer jumps with his V style but the judges only awarded him 15-16 points. The V style was also used by the Swede Jan Boklöv in the late 1980s. In a competition in Karpacz, Graf performed the longest jump but took only 4th place. He set hill records in Miłków, Kottmar, Lubawka and Szklarska Poręba. In 1980 he took part in the World Cup in Zakopane where he landed a jump of 108 metres. He ended his career in 1982, when he graduated from the Wrocław University of Physical Education. In 1989, the last time he jumped in Szklarska Poręba, he won the competition, setting a new hill record. After his retirement he worked as a physical education teacher and coach. He is a member of the Nordic combined commission in the Polish Ski Federation. For nine years he managed a ski jumping club, the UKS GRAF-ski. In November 2014 he was elected mayor of Szklarska Poręba.
