= Sophronia consanguinella =

Scientific classification
- Domain: Eukaryota
- Kingdom: Animalia
- Phylum: Arthropoda
- Class: Insecta
- Order: Lepidoptera
- Family: Gelechiidae
- Genus: Sophronia
- Species: S. consanguinella

Binomial name
- Sophronia consanguinella Herrich-Schäffer, 1854

Synonyms
- Sophronia uniplagella Rebel, 1927

Species of moth

Sophronia consanguinella is a moth of the family Gelechiidae. It was described by Gottlieb August Wilhelm Herrich-Schäffer in 1854. It is found in Germany, Austria, the Czech Republic, Slovakia, Hungary, Bulgaria, Ukraine and Russia.
