= Sophronia aquilex =

Scientific classification
- Kingdom: Animalia
- Phylum: Arthropoda
- Class: Insecta
- Order: Lepidoptera
- Family: Gelechiidae
- Genus: Sophronia
- Species: S. aquilex

Binomial name
- Sophronia aquilex Meyrick, 1926

Species of moth

Sophronia aquilex is a moth of the family Gelechiidae. It was described by Edward Meyrick in 1926. It is found in South Africa.
