= Sophronia grandii =

Scientific classification
- Domain: Eukaryota
- Kingdom: Animalia
- Phylum: Arthropoda
- Class: Insecta
- Order: Lepidoptera
- Family: Gelechiidae
- Genus: Sophronia
- Species: S. grandii

Binomial name
- Sophronia grandii Hering, 1933

Species of moth

Sophronia grandii is a moth of the family Gelechiidae. It was described by Erich Martin Hering in 1933. It is found in Spain and Italy.
