= Sophronia ascalis =

Scientific classification
- Kingdom: Animalia
- Phylum: Arthropoda
- Clade: Pancrustacea
- Class: Insecta
- Order: Lepidoptera
- Family: Gelechiidae
- Genus: Sophronia
- Species: S. ascalis

Binomial name
- Sophronia ascalis Gozmány, 1951

Species of moth

Sophronia ascalis is a moth of the family Gelechiidae. It was described by László Anthony Gozmány in 1951. It is found in Germany, Austria, Croatia, Hungary, Romania, the Czech Republic, Slovakia, Slovenia, and North Macedonia.
