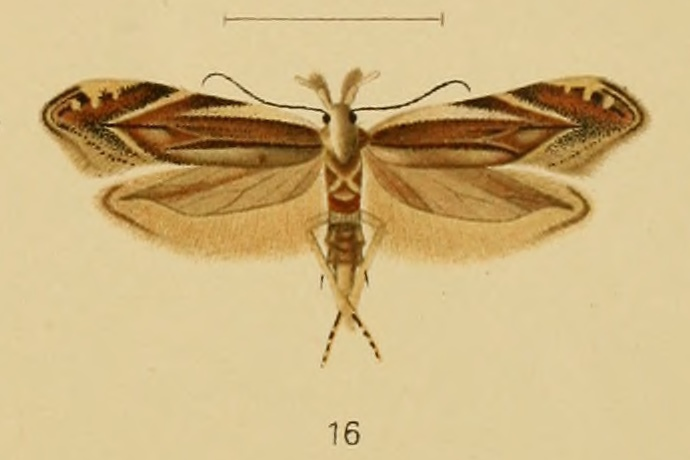

Scientific classification
- Domain: Eukaryota
- Kingdom: Animalia
- Phylum: Arthropoda
- Class: Insecta
- Order: Lepidoptera
- Family: Gelechiidae
- Genus: Sophronia
- Species: S. acaudella

Binomial name
- Sophronia acaudella Rebel, 1903

= Sophronia acaudella =

Species of moth

Sophronia acaudella is a moth of the family Gelechiidae. It was described by Rebel in 1903. It is found in Bulgaria.

The wingspan is about 13 mm. Adults are very similar to Sophronia chilonella.
