= Wlastimil Hofman =

Polish painter (1881–1970)

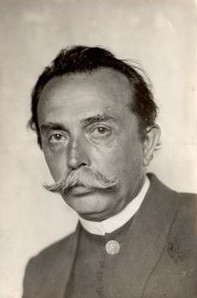
Wlastimil Hofman

Madonna, 1909

Wlastimil Hofman (27 April 1881 – 6 March 1970) was a Polish painter, one of the more popular painters of the interwar and postwar years.

== Life ==
Hofman was born Vlastimil Hofmann in Prague to Ferdinand Hofmann, a Czech, and Teofila Muzyk Terlecka, a Polish woman. In 1889 Vlastimil's family moved to Kraków in Poland, where he attended St Barbara's School and then the Jan III Sobieski high school. In 1896, he became a student at the Academy of Fine Arts in Kraków, where he studied under, i.a., Jacek Malczewski.

In 1899 he went to study painting at the École nationale supérieure des Beaux-Arts in Paris. In 1902 he had his first showings in an exhibition by the "Sztuka" society. Further exhibitions followed in Munich, Amsterdam, Rome, Berlin, Prague, Vienna, and Warsaw. In 1904 he painted the first of his village (or peasant) "Madonnas". In 1905 he started the cycle of pictures called "Confession" which brought him international recognition. In 1907 he was the first Polish painter to be made a member of the Gallery of the Vienna Secession. When his professor, Jacek Malczewski, was appointed the Rector of the Kraków Academy of Fine Arts in 1912, Hofman obtained a teaching post there. With the outbreak of World War I, in 1914–1920 he lived in Prague and then in Paris, marrying his beloved Ada in 1919. Back in Kraków in 1921, he and his wife lived in a villa on Spadzista Street, later renamed Hofman Street in his honour. Sometime around 1922, influenced by his friendship with Jacek Malczewski, he changed the spelling of his name from Czech to a Polonised 'Wlastimil'. Malczewski died in 1929. Hofman's work was also part of the painting event in the art competition at the 1928 Summer Olympics.

In September 1939 Hofman fled from the Nazi invasion, mainly as a result of hiding Czech refugees (including later President, Ludvík Svoboda). Escaping the German Nazis he and his wife found themselves on the part of the Polish territory invaded by the Soviet Red Army after 17 September 1939. He managed to avoid Soviet captivity, though in Pomorzany he witnessed Polish soldiers being deported to camps inside Soviet Russia, among them officers sent to Kozelsk. He reportedly "showed the Polish POWs a lot of compassion and tirelessly painted their portraits on small pieces of cardboard. The portraits were then to be sent to their families." On all accounts it is then that he befriended Zdzisław Peszkowski, who on the day before the transport to Kozelsk left in Hofman's care the regiment's money. According to Hofman's biographical notes, he managed to join the soldiers of the Czechoslovak Legion and with them travelled through Ternopil, Istanbul, Haifa and Tel-Aviv to Jerusalem and Palestine, which is where he spent the remainder of the war. In 1942, he published a book of poetry called Through Darkness to Freedom.

Hofman returned to Kraków in June 1946. In May 1947 at the suggestion of his friend Jan Sztaudynger the Hofmans moved to Szklarska Poręba in the Sudety mountains. In July they received a house there, which they called 'Wlastimilówka'. In the period 1953–1963 he produced religious paintings for the local church, including "Four Evangelists", "The Way of the Rosary", "The Way of the Cross", "The Adoration of the Child". He also produced many portraits of local people, sports figures - especially footballers from his favourite Wisła Kraków team - and also self-portraits. In 1961, he was awarded the Cross of the Order of Polonia Restituta. Wlastimil Hofman died on 6 March 1970 and he and his wife are buried in the parochial cemetery in Szklarska Poręba, next to the Corpus Christi Church, run by the Franciscan Fathers and decorated with pictures and banners painted by Wlastimil Hofman with the painting entitled “Jesus Christ with the Holy Eucharist” in the main altar.

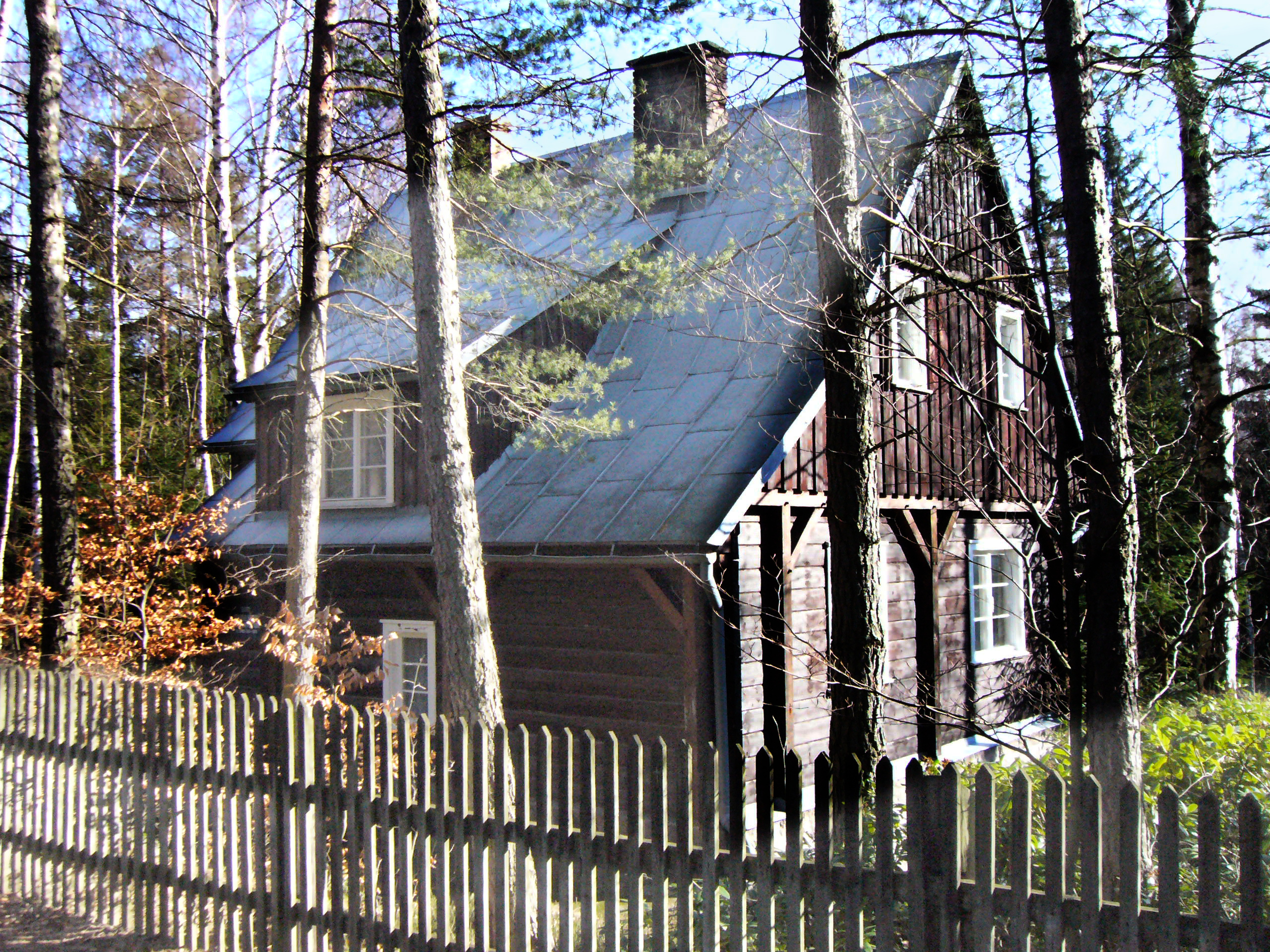
Hofman's house; 23 Matejki Street in Szklarska Poręba
