= Szklarska Poręba =

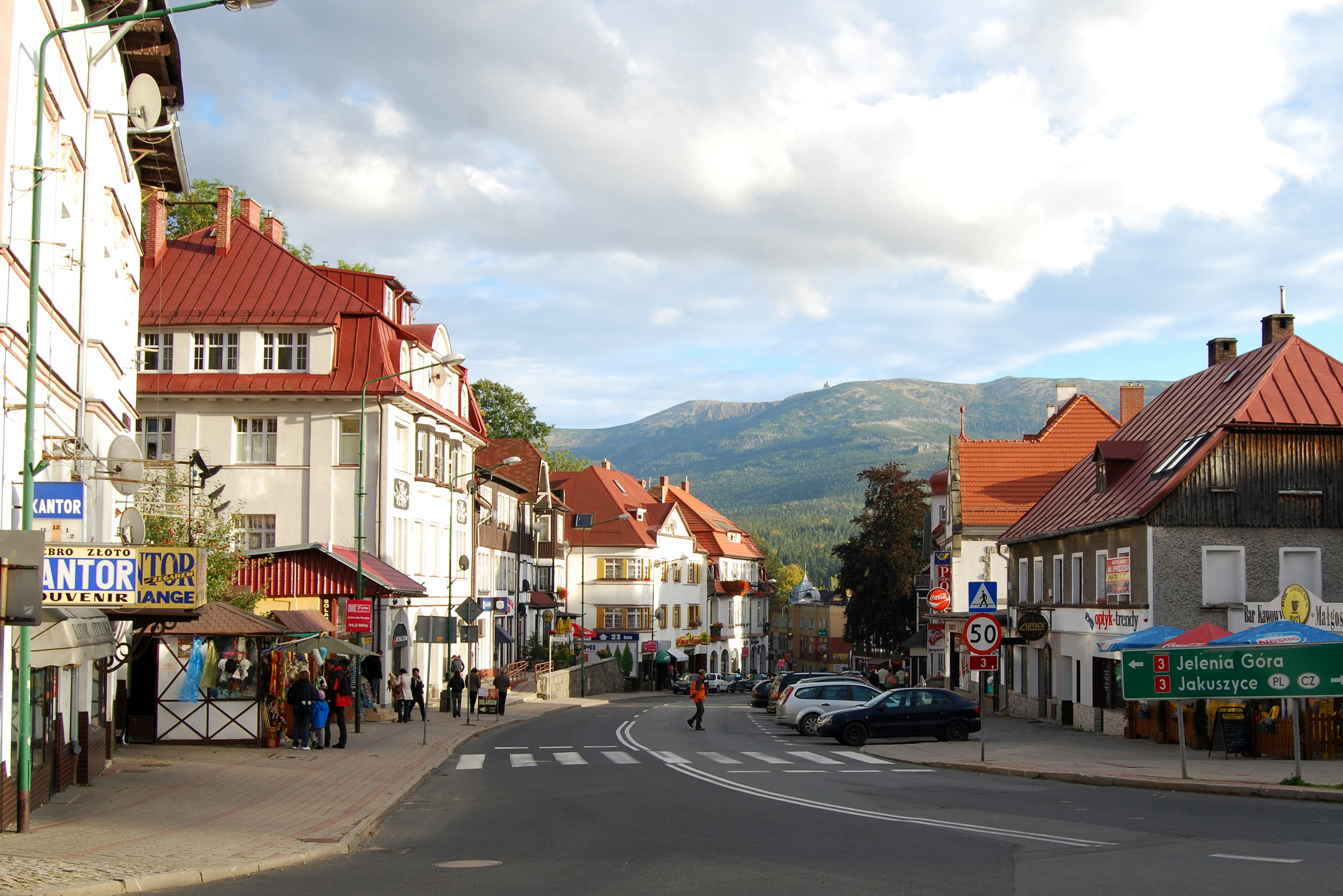
- Town centre

- Flag Coat of arms
- Interactive map of Szklarska Poręba
- Location within Poland
- Coordinates: 50°50′N 15°32′E
- Country: Poland
- Voivodeship: Lower Silesian
- County: Karkonosze
- Gmina: Szklarska Poręba (urban gmina)
- Founded: 14th century
- Town rights: 1959

Area
  - Total: 75.44 km^{2} (29.13 sq mi)
- Highest elevation: 886 m (2,907 ft)
- Lowest elevation: 440 m (1,440 ft)

Population (2019-06-30)
  - Total: 6,557
  - Density: 86.92/km^{2} (225.1/sq mi)
- Time zone: UTC+1 (CET)
  - Summer (DST): UTC+2 (CEST)
- Postal code: 58-580
- Website: www.szklarskaporeba.pl

Szklarska Poręba (Polish: [ˈʂklarska pɔˈrɛmba], German: Schreiberhau) is a border town in Karkonosze County, Lower Silesian Voivodeship, in south-western Poland. The town has a population of around 6,500. It is a popular ski resort.

Szklarska Poręba is an important regional and national centre for mountain hiking, cycling and skiing. The ski resorts in this area are growing in popularity as a budget alternative to the Alps, thanks to wide range of both Alpine and Nordic skiing facilities.

== Geography ==
Szklarska Poręba is situated in the Sudetes, in the valley of the Kamienna, between the Karkonosze Mountains in the south and Jizera Mountains in the west, at 440–886 m (1,444–2,907 ft) above sea level, 26 kilometres (16 mi) south-west of Jelenia Góra.

== History ==
=== Establishment and early history ===
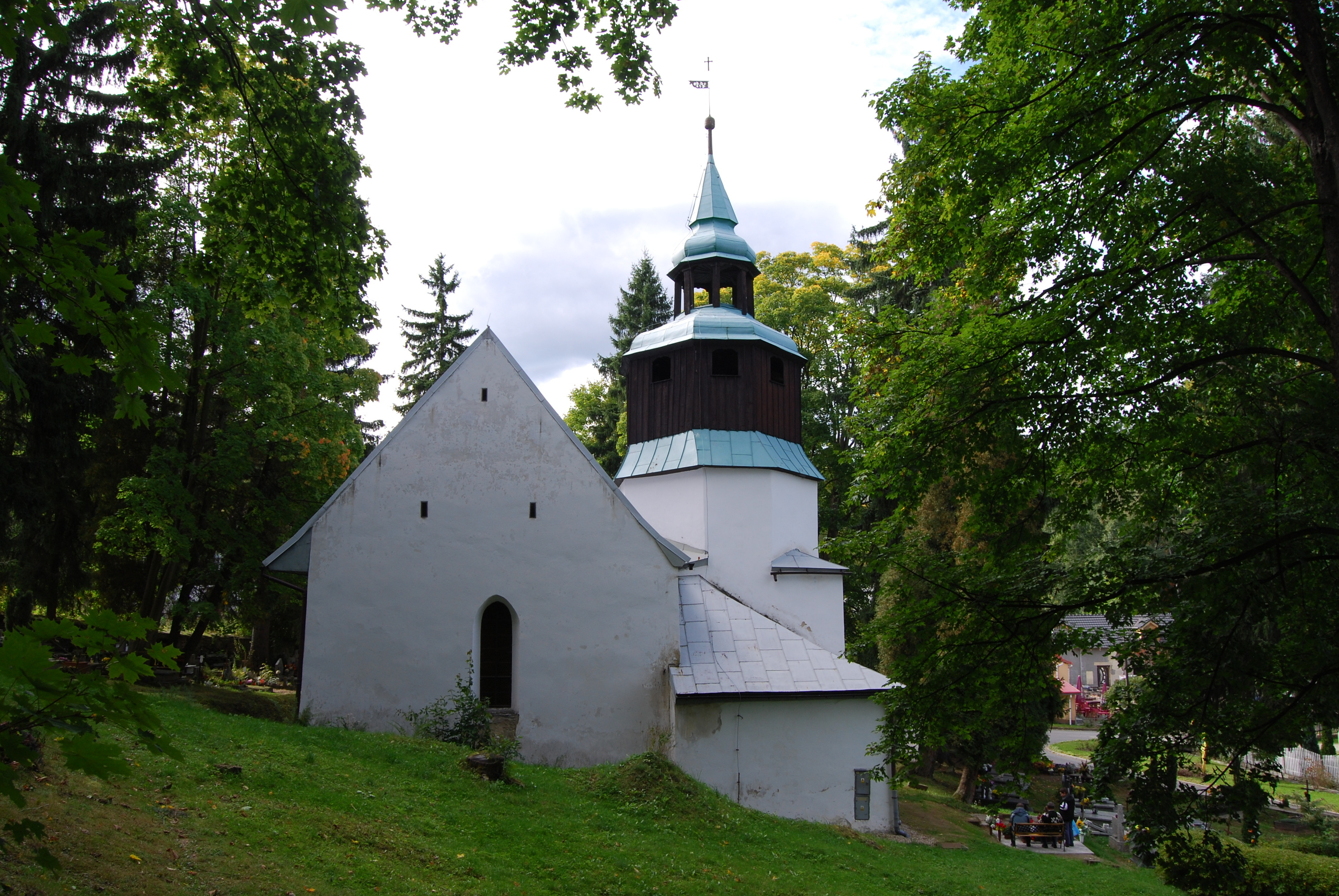
Our Lady of the Rosary church, the oldest preserved church in Szklarska Poręba

The land on which the village was founded was bought in the 13th century from Duke Bernard the Lightsome by the Knights Hospitaller descending from Calidus Fons (now Cieplice Śląskie-Zdrój in Jelenia Góra), who were interested in finding gold and precious gems in the area. It was part of the duchies of Lwówek and Jawor, the southwesternmost duchies of fragmented Piast-ruled Poland. The village was established, as part of the Duchy of Jawor, and settled by German colonists. It was first mentioned in 1366 and 1372 in conjunction with a glass factory, forerunner of the famed later Josephinenhütte, as Schribirshau and Schreibershow.

In 1578 several Czech Protestants moved to the village and greatly contributed to its development. Among the refugees was Marie Pluch, which gave the district Marysin its name. Experts on herbal medicine, who collected medicinal plants and produced famous herbal medicines, have made their mark in the history of the region. Over time the glass factory moved deeper into the mountains. In 1617 the Preußler family migrated from the southern, Bohemian side of the Karkonosze ridge to Silesia and received a concession to run a movable glass factory from the counts of Schaffgotsch, landlords of Schreiberhau. The glass industry of the village was dominated by the Preußler family for the next 200 years. In 1842 Franz Pohl, son-in-law of the last Preußler, persuaded Count Schaffgotsch to establish a new glass factory in Schreiberhau. This Josephinenhütte became the largest and best glass factory in Silesia, while Schreiberhau greatly expanded to become the largest village in Prussia, which annexed the region in 1742, with 15 districts covering 43 square kilometres (17 sq mi).

=== 20th century ===
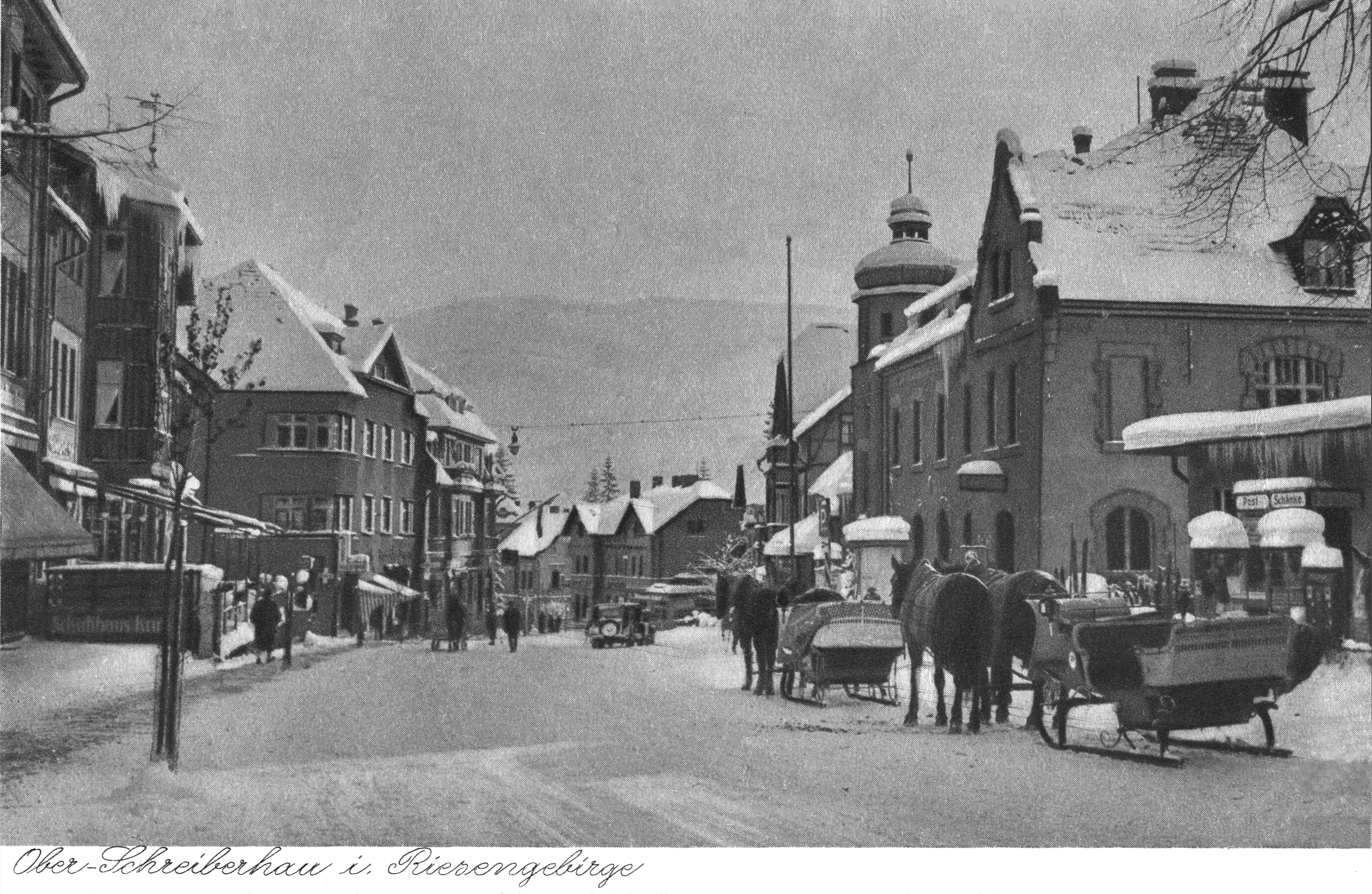
Town centre, c. 1940

Around 1900 several artists discovered the beauty of the countryside and formed the Schreiberhau artists' colony, among them Gerhart Hauptmann and his brother Carl, Otto Mueller, Wilhelm Bölsche, and composer Anna Teichmüller. In 1911, Wanda Bibrowicz founded the Silesian Artistic Weaving Workshop with an exhibition gallery, which existed until 1919. Later, younger artists formed the St. Lukas artists' association. In 1925 the first winter games of the International Workers Olympiad (organised by the Socialist Workers' Sport International) were held in the town. Twelve national delegations participated.

During World War II the Reich Labour Service (RAD) ran two Nazi German labor camps, RAD-Abteilung 6/103 and RAD-Abteilung 6/107, in the settlement. In 1942, the Germans also established a forced labour camp for Soviet prisoners of war in its vicinity. With the advance of the Red Army, German authorities called the population to flee their homes. Many fled to neighboring Sudetenland in German-occupied Czechoslovakia.

After the defeat of Nazi Germany in World War II Schreiberhau became again part of Poland under the territorial changes of Poland after World War II and was given the name Szklarska Poręba which literally means "glassmakers' clearing". In accordance to the Potsdam Agreement, the German inhabitants were expelled and the village was resettled with Poles, many of whom were themselves expelled from former eastern Poland annexed by the Soviet Union. The Josephinenhütte was moved to Schwäbisch Gmünd. The glass factory in Szklarska Poręba was renamed and continued to operate. On 22–27 September 1947 the conference on the establishment of the communist information office (Kominform) took place in the village. Following the Korean War, in 1953–1959, Poland admitted 181 North Korean orphans in Szklarska Poręba. The village gained the status of a town in 1959. In 1963, a mass grave of POWs murdered by the Germans in World War II was discovered.

== Transport ==
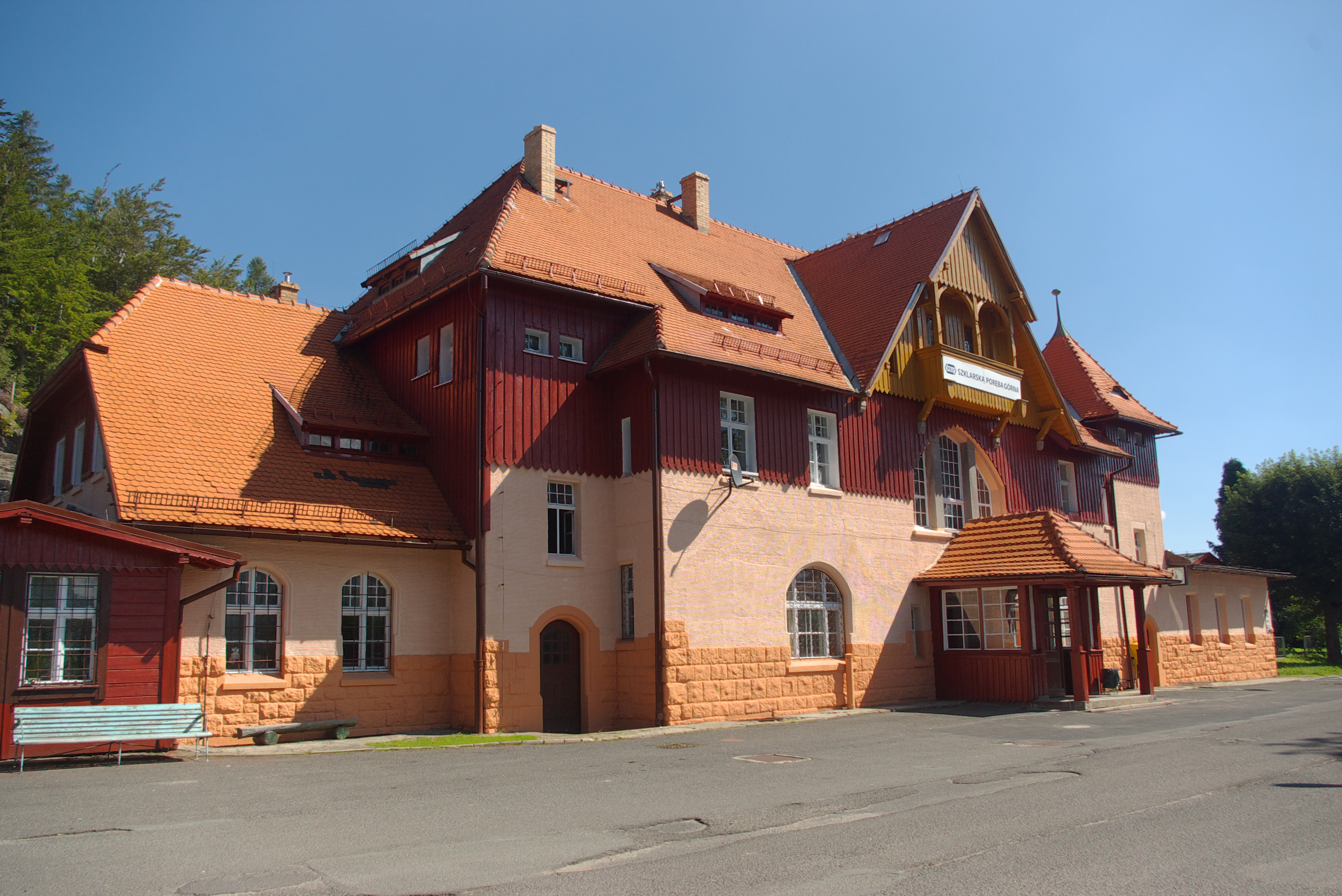
Szklarska Poręba Górna railway station

The town used to be connected via the Zackenbahn railway to Tanvald in Bohemia. The cross-border passenger line was closed in 1945 when the town was given to Poland and remained closed until 2010. In 2010 the cross-border railway connection was reconstructed and is now operated by passenger trains from Kořenov. The railway connection to Jelenia Góra plays a minor role, since the scale of the mining industry in the town's vicinity has decreased. Lower Silesian Railways route D21 runs from Szklarska Poręba Górna to Liberec.

A section of national road no. 3, also part of European route E65, passes through the town.

== Sports ==
FIS Cross-Country World Cup events were held in Szklarska Poręba in 2012 and 2014. The Bieg Piastów cross-country skiing marathon is held in the town since 1976.

== Notable people ==
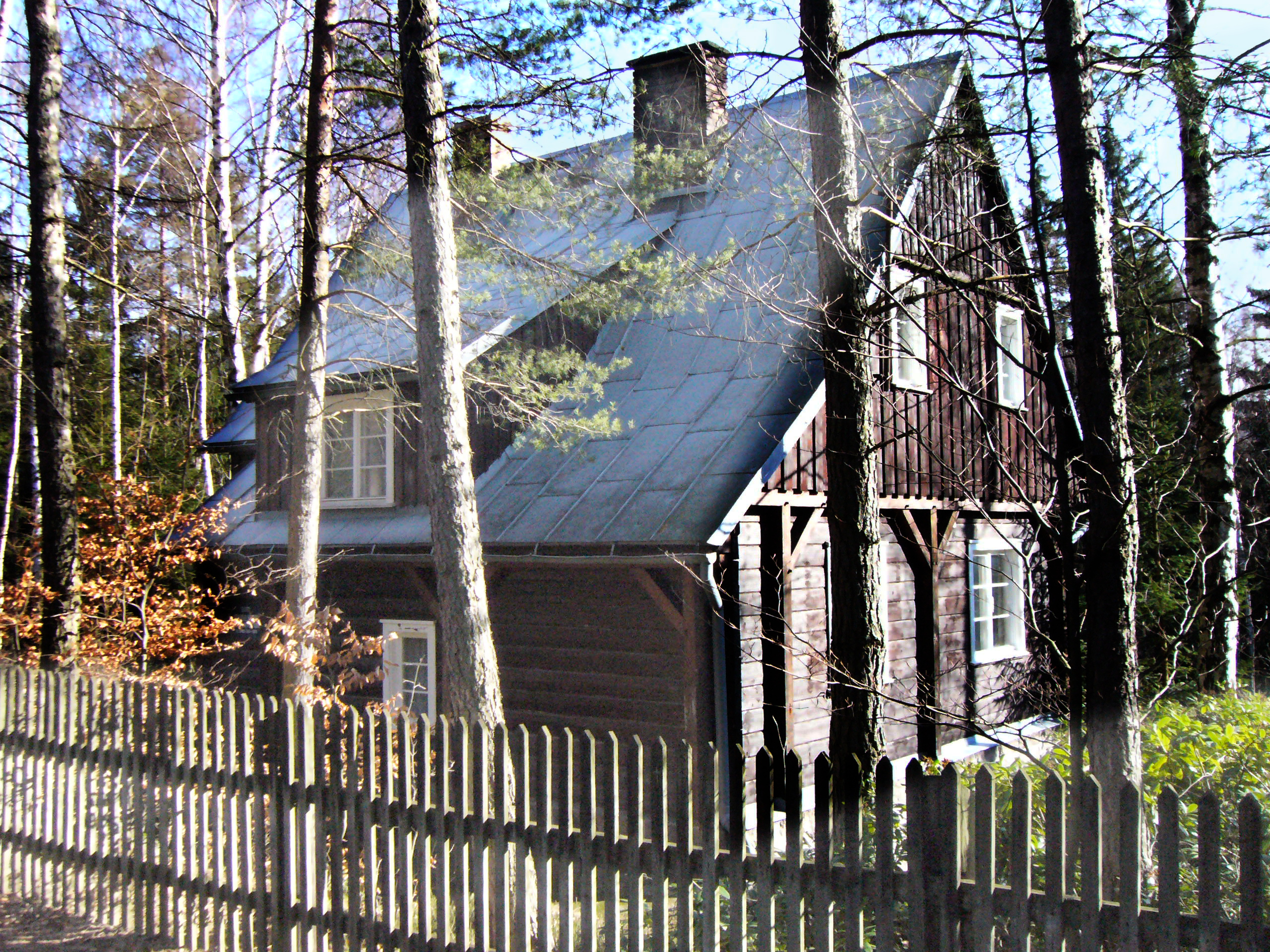
Former home of painter Wlastimil Hofman

- Joseph Partsch (1851–1925), German geographer
- Max Standfuss (1854–1917), Swiss scientist
- Wlastimil Hofman (1881–1970), Czech-Polish painter
- Mirosław Graf (born 1959), Polish former ski jumper and mayor of Szklarska Poręba

== Twin towns – sister cities ==
Szklarska Poręba is twinned with:

- Bad Harzburg, Germany
- Harrachov, Czech Republic
- Kazimierz Dolny, Poland
- Kořenov, Czech Republic
- Worpswede, Germany

== Gallery ==
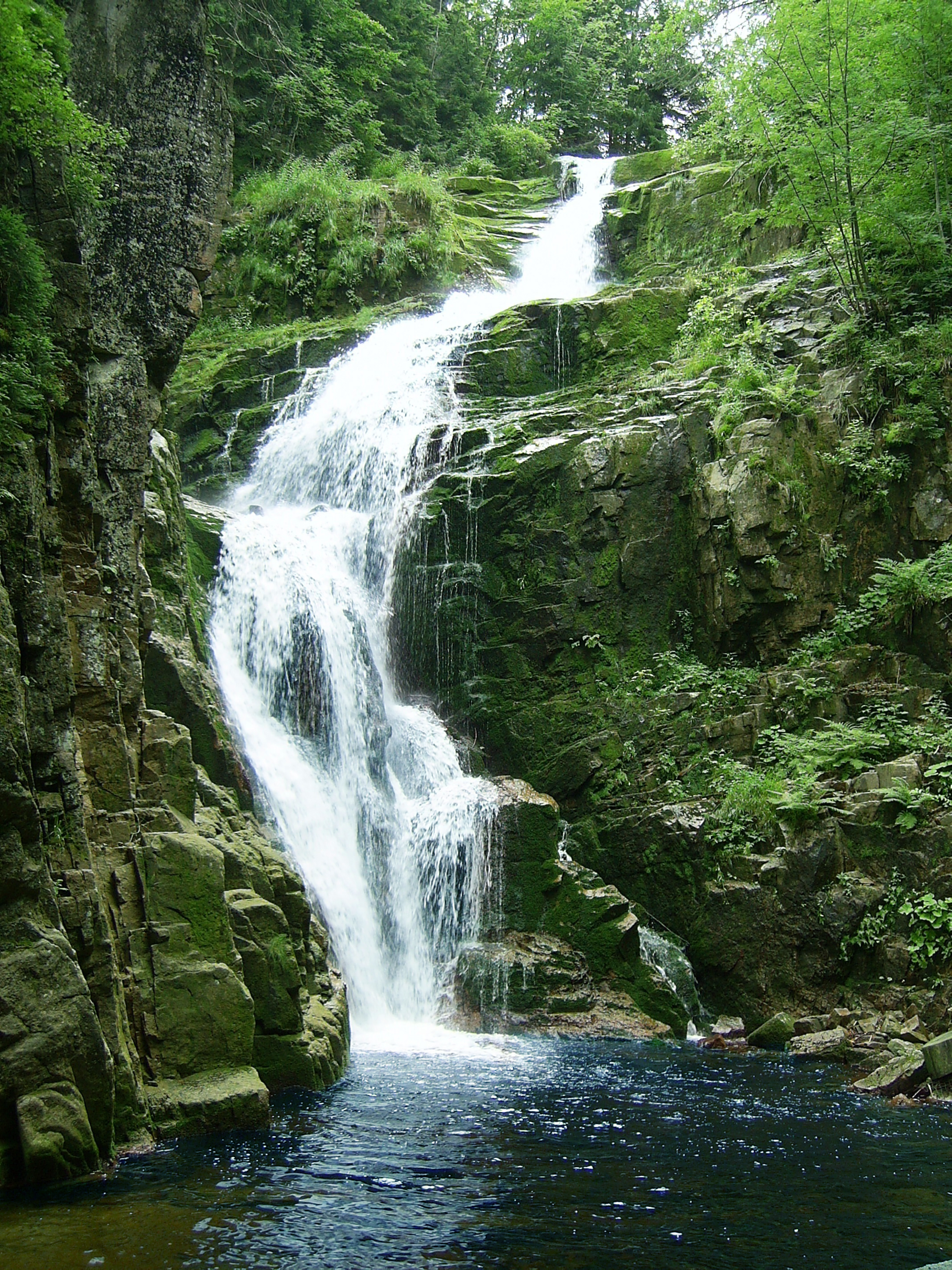
Kamieńczyk Falls

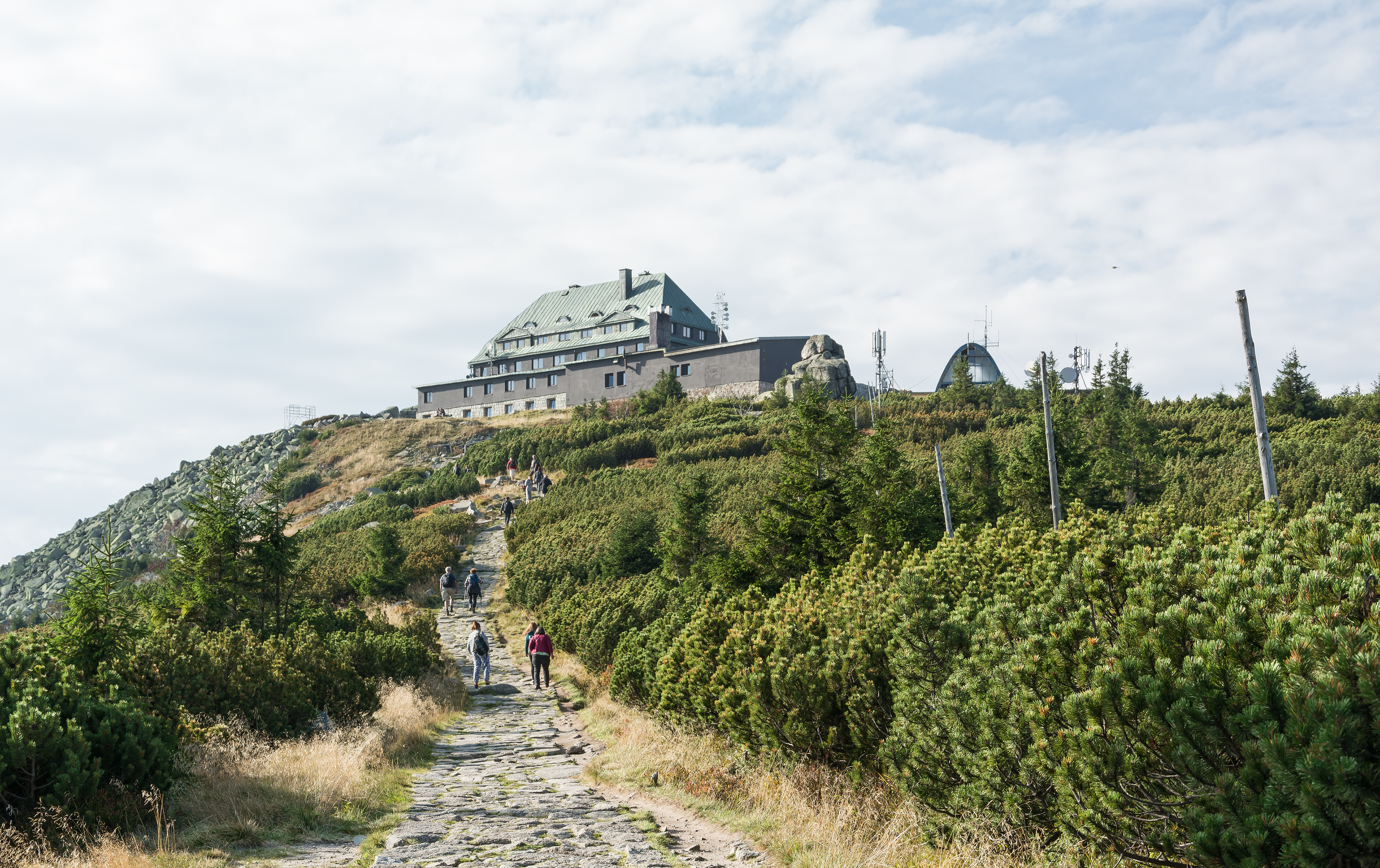
Mountain hut on Szrenica

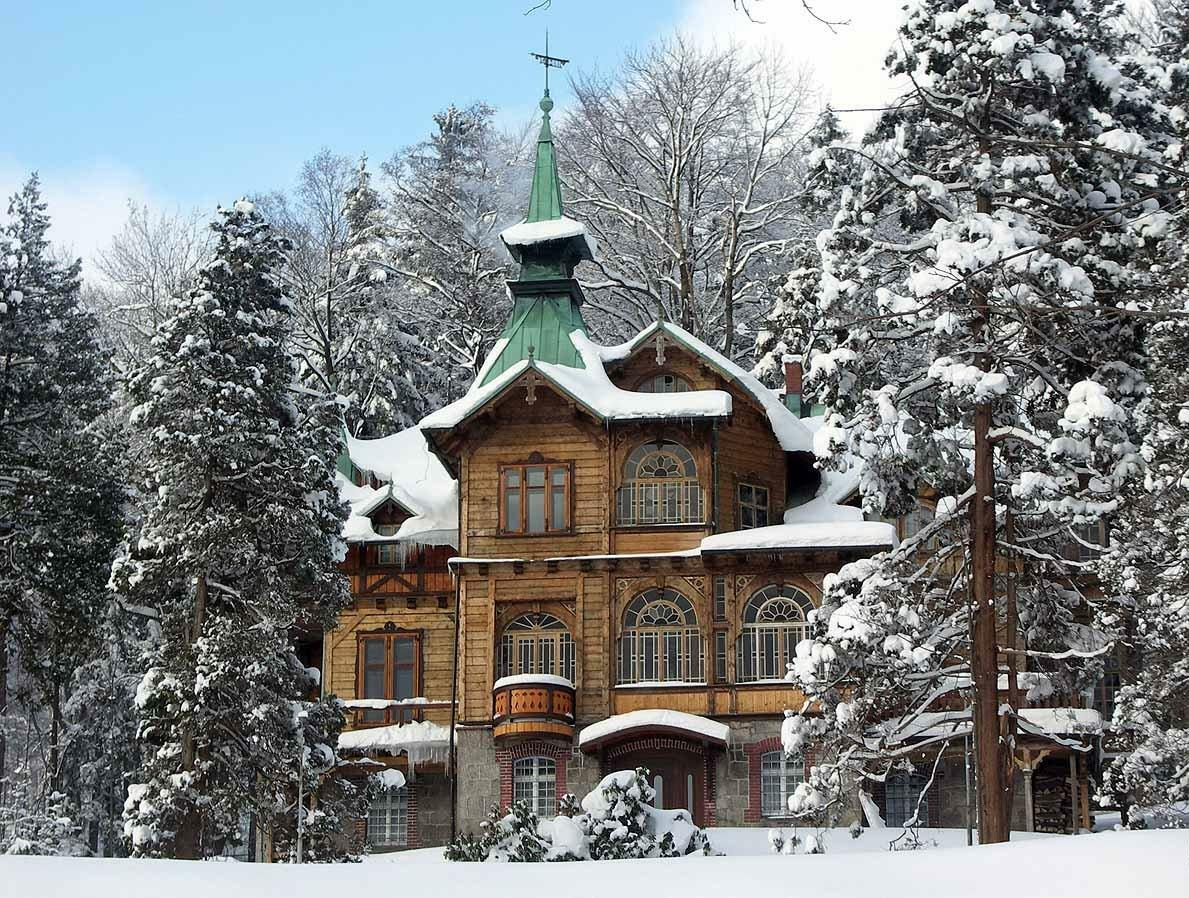
"Jaskółka" Villa

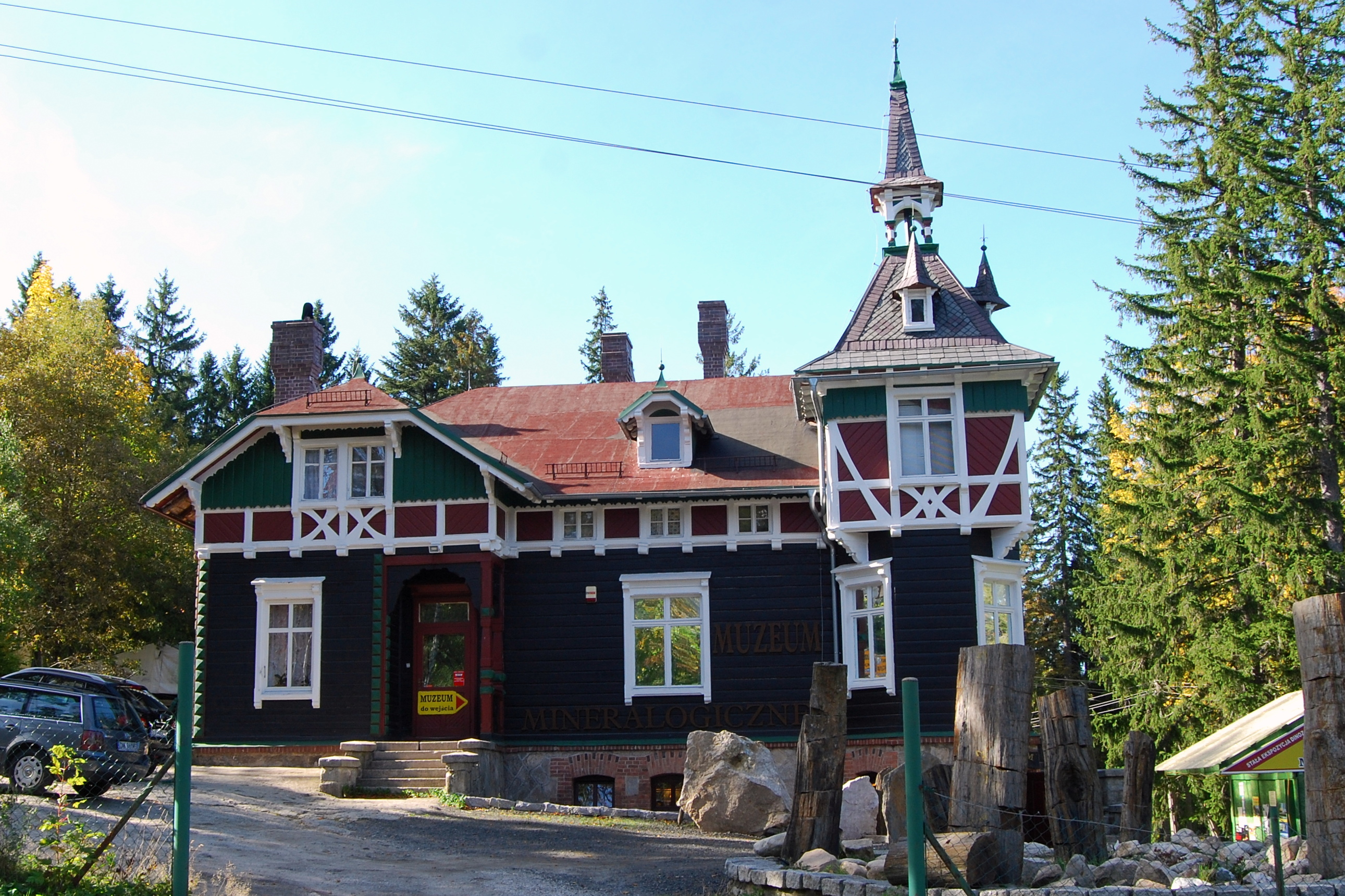
Mineralogical Museum

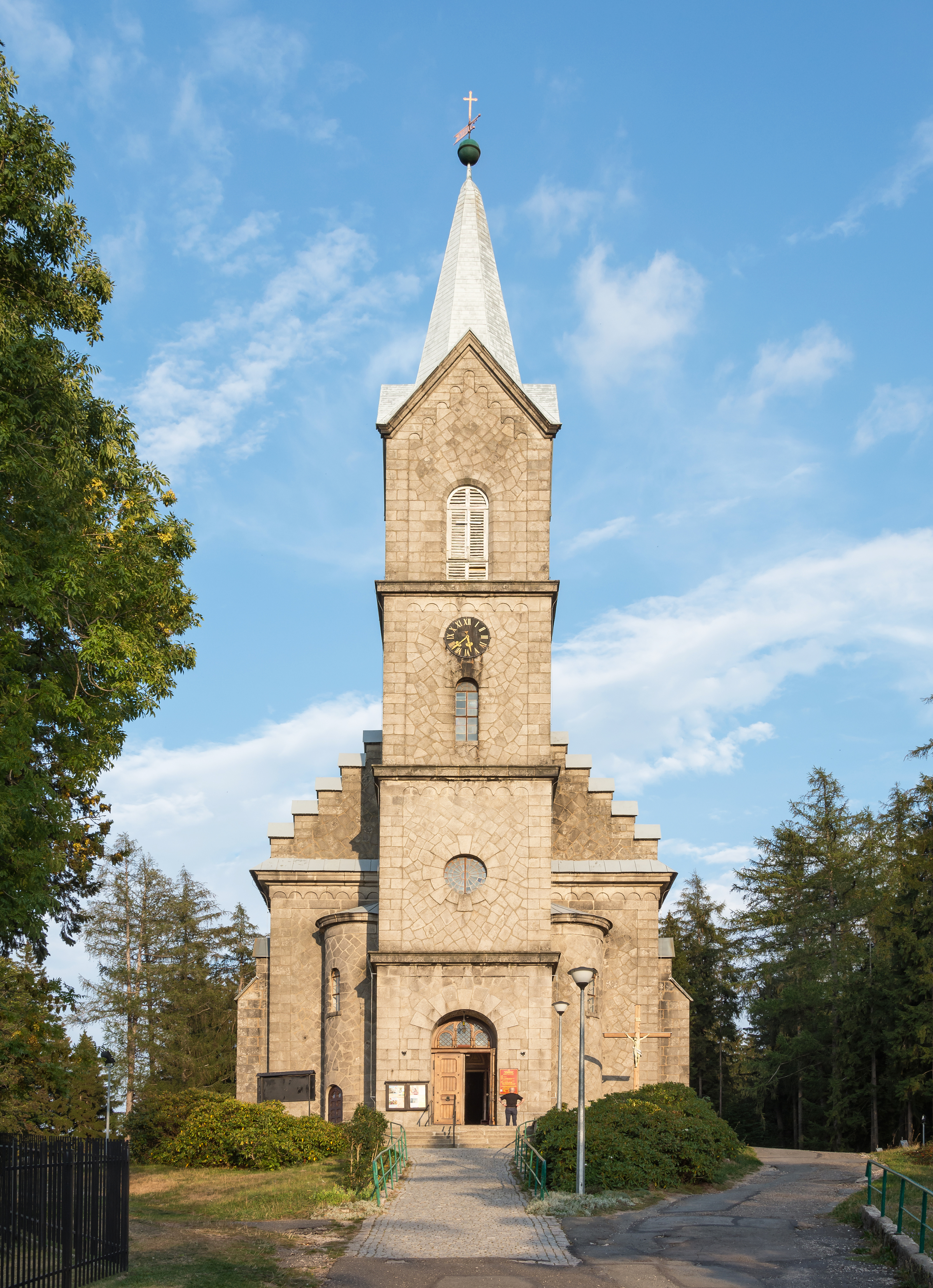
Corpus Christi church

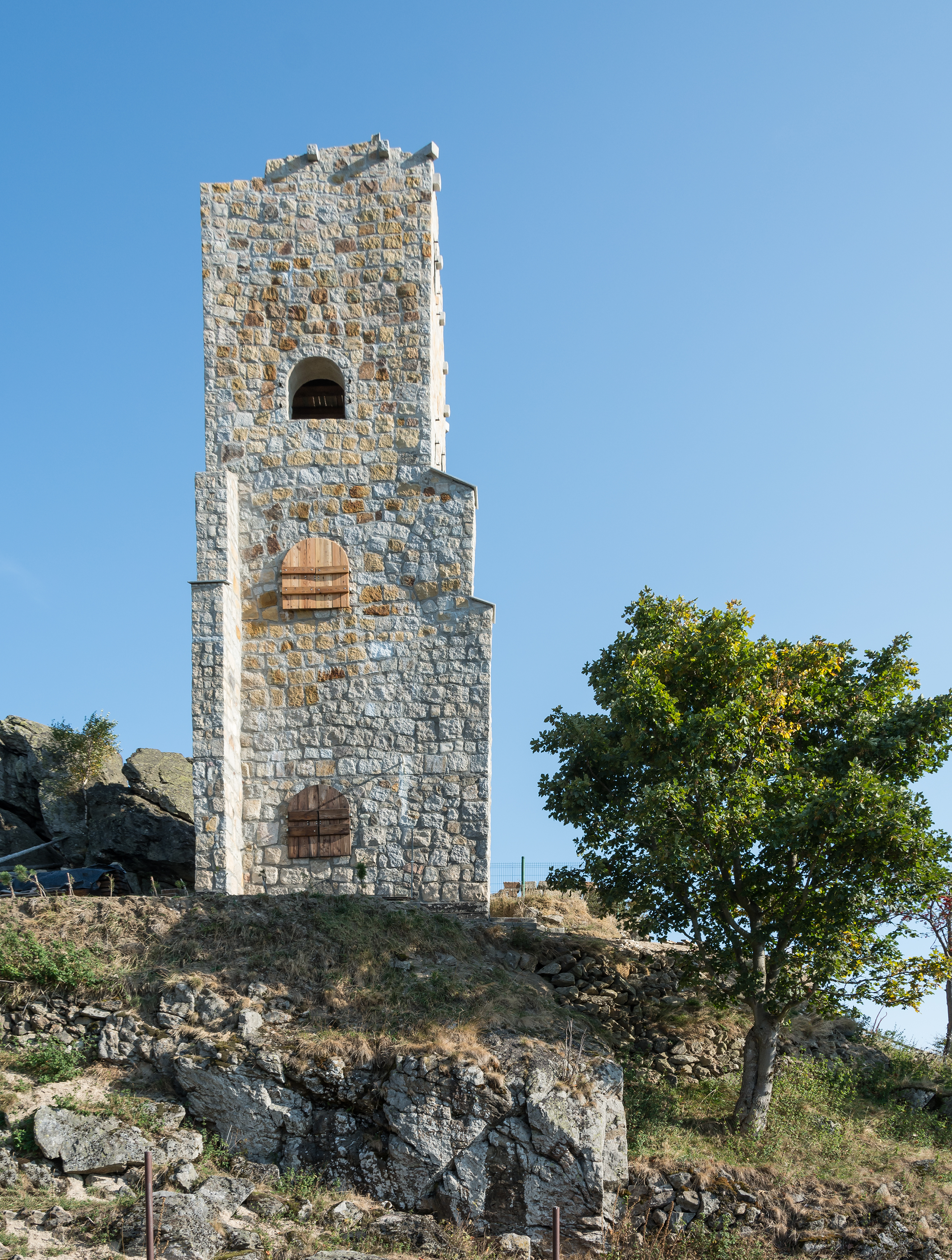
Observation tower on Wysoki Kamień
