= Sophronia parahumerella =

Scientific classification
- Domain: Eukaryota
- Kingdom: Animalia
- Phylum: Arthropoda
- Class: Insecta
- Order: Lepidoptera
- Family: Gelechiidae
- Genus: Sophronia
- Species: S. parahumerella

Binomial name
- Sophronia parahumerella Amsel, 1935

Species of moth

Sophronia parahumerella is a moth of the family Gelechiidae. It was described by Hans Georg Amsel in 1935. It is found in Palestine.
