= Sophronia mediatrix =

Scientific classification
- Kingdom: Animalia
- Phylum: Arthropoda
- Clade: Pancrustacea
- Class: Insecta
- Order: Lepidoptera
- Family: Gelechiidae
- Genus: Sophronia
- Species: S. mediatrix

Binomial name
- Sophronia mediatrix Zeller, 1877

Species of moth

Sophronia mediatrix is a moth of the family Gelechiidae. It was described by Zeller in 1877. It is found in Colombia.
