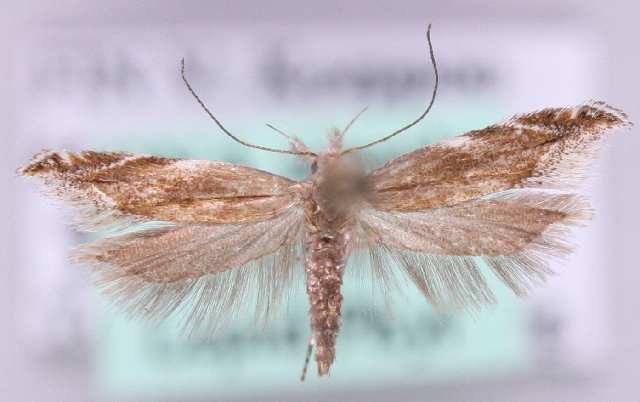

Scientific classification
- Kingdom: Animalia
- Phylum: Arthropoda
- Clade: Pancrustacea
- Class: Insecta
- Order: Lepidoptera
- Family: Gelechiidae
- Genus: Sophronia
- Species: S. sicariellus

Binomial name
- Sophronia sicariellus (Zeller, 1839)

Synonyms
- Ypsolophus sicariellus Zeller, 1839

= Sophronia sicariellus =

Species of moth

Sophronia sicariellus is a moth of the family Gelechiidae. It was described by Zeller in 1839. It is found in most of Europe, except Iceland, Ireland, Great Britain, the Benelux, Portugal and Croatia.

The wingspan is 13–14 mm.

The larvae feed on Achillea millefolium.
