= Sophronia catharurga =

Scientific classification
- Kingdom: Animalia
- Phylum: Arthropoda
- Class: Insecta
- Order: Lepidoptera
- Family: Gelechiidae
- Genus: Sophronia
- Species: S. catharurga

Binomial name
- Sophronia catharurga Meyrick, 1923

Species of moth

Sophronia catharurga is a moth of the family Gelechiidae. It was described by Edward Meyrick in 1923. It is found in Palestine.

The wingspan is about 11 mm. The forewings are greyish ochreous, on the costa posteriorly sprinkled with dark grey, the dorsal area is broadly suffused with silvery whitish and with a moderate shining white costal streak from the base to the middle, then leaving the costa and continued narrowed to four-fifths, where it receives an oblique white strigula from the costa at three-fifths. Beneath this are three short longitudinal white lines in the disc from the middle, the uppermost running into the costal streak, some white sprinkling beyond these. There is a spot of whitish suffusion on the tornus, followed by some dark grey sprinkles. The hindwings are grey whitish.
