= Sophronia sagittans =

Scientific classification
- Kingdom: Animalia
- Phylum: Arthropoda
- Class: Insecta
- Order: Lepidoptera
- Family: Gelechiidae
- Genus: Sophronia
- Species: S. sagittans

Binomial name
- Sophronia sagittans Meyrick, 1923

Synonyms
- Sophronia karmeliella Amsel, 1933

Species of moth

Sophronia sagittans is a moth of the family Gelechiidae. It was described by Edward Meyrick in 1923. It is found in Palestine.

The wingspan is 13–14 mm. The forewings are ochreous fulvous or ochreous brown with a white streak, attenuated basally, along the costa, the anterior margin of the forewing, from the base to near the middle, then leaving the costa and narrowed to beyond the middle. There is a very oblique white striga (pointed, rigid hairlike scale or bristle) from the costa at two-thirds, near the termen acutely angulated to the tornus, edged posteriorly with dark grey speckling which is strongest in the disc, and preceded in the angle by a fine black dash. There are two or sometimes three inwards-oblique white marks on the costa posteriorly, followed by two black marks before the apex. The hindwings are grey.
