= Sophronia primella =

Scientific classification
- Domain: Eukaryota
- Kingdom: Animalia
- Phylum: Arthropoda
- Class: Insecta
- Order: Lepidoptera
- Family: Gelechiidae
- Genus: Sophronia
- Species: S. primella

Binomial name
- Sophronia primella Busck, 1907

Species of moth

Sophronia primella is a moth of the family Gelechiidae. It was described by August Busck in 1907. It is found in North America, where it has been recorded Alabama, Illinois, Kansas, Oklahoma, Tennessee, Arizona and Colorado.

The wingspan is about 17 mm. The forewings are ochreous, mottled and longitudinally streaked with white, black and fuscous. The costal edge, from the base to apical third is white, edged below by a narrow streak strongly mottled with fuscous. Below it is a nearly unmottled area of clear ochreous, reaching to the middle of the wing and only transversed by a single dark line on the subcostal vein. From base through the center of the wing run close beside each other two parallel black lines, interrupted at the end of the cell by a round brown dot, but continued on the other side nearly to a small round black dot at the apex. The dorsal part of the wing is rather freely dusted with white and brown scales and on the middle of the fold is an oblong brown dot. The hindwings are light ochreous fuscous.
