= Sophronia alaicella =

Scientific classification
- Domain: Eukaryota
- Kingdom: Animalia
- Phylum: Arthropoda
- Class: Insecta
- Order: Lepidoptera
- Family: Gelechiidae
- Genus: Sophronia
- Species: S. alaicella

Binomial name
- Sophronia alaicella Caradja, 1920

Species of moth

Sophronia alaicella is a moth of the family Gelechiidae. It was described by Aristide Caradja in 1920. It is found in the Alay Mountains in central Asia.
