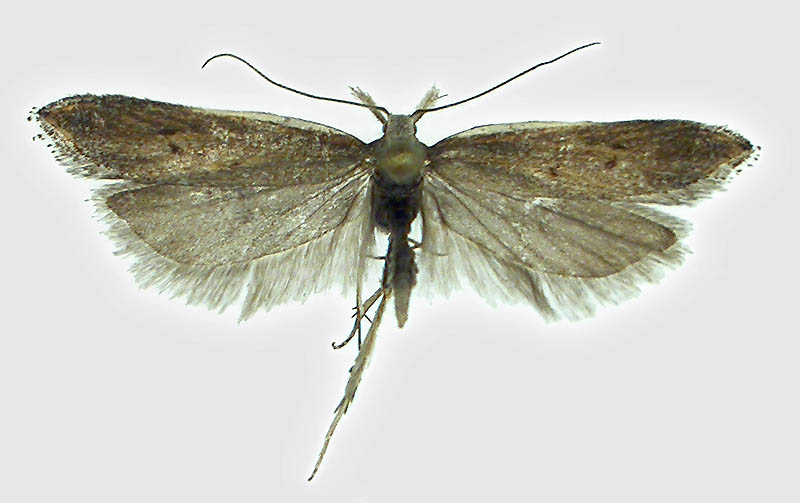

Scientific classification
- Kingdom: Animalia
- Phylum: Arthropoda
- Clade: Pancrustacea
- Class: Insecta
- Order: Lepidoptera
- Family: Gelechiidae
- Genus: Sophronia
- Species: S. semicostella

Binomial name
- Sophronia semicostella (Hübner, 1813)

Synonyms
- Tinea semicostella Hübner, 1813; Sophronia parenthesella Haworth, 1828

= Sophronia semicostella =

Species of moth

Sophronia semicostella is a moth of the family Gelechiidae. It is found in most of Europe, except Greece, Bulgaria and the islands in the Mediterranean Sea.

The wingspan is about 18 mm. Adults are on wing from June to July.

The larvae probably feed on Anthoxanthum odoratum.
