= Sophronia gelidella =

Scientific classification
- Domain: Eukaryota
- Kingdom: Animalia
- Phylum: Arthropoda
- Class: Insecta
- Order: Lepidoptera
- Family: Gelechiidae
- Genus: Sophronia
- Species: S. gelidella

Binomial name
- Sophronia gelidella Nordmann, 1941

Species of moth

Sophronia gelidella is a moth of the family Gelechiidae. It was described by Nordmann in 1941. It is found in Norway, Sweden, Finland and northern Russia. It has also been recorded from North America (Yukon).

The wingspan is 17–19 mm.

The larvae feed on Dryas octopetala.
