= Joseph Partsch =

German geographer (1851–1925)

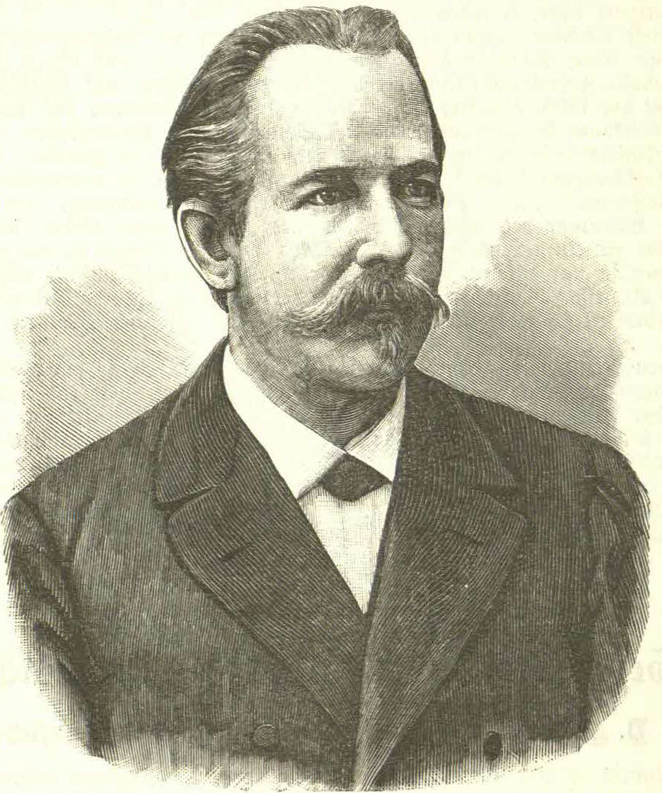
Joseph Partsch

Joseph Partsch (4 July 1851 – 22 June 1925) was a German geographer, born at Schreiberhau, Silesia.

== Biography ==
He studied at the University of Breslau, receiving his doctorate in 1874, and began teaching at the university (privat-docent, 1875), becoming later a professor of geography. Here he remained until 1905, when on the death of Friedrich Ratzel, he was called to the chair of geography at the University of Leipzig. Here, he served as a full professor of geography up until 1922. He died in Bad Brambach, Vogtland on June 22, 1925.

== Contributions ==
His earlier writings were devoted to classical geography, but in later years he wrote extensively on glacial geology, the history of geography, and regional geography. In the last group are some of his best-known works, such as the systemic monographs on the Ionian Islands, the standard geography of central Europe, and the geography of Silesia. Among English-speaking people he is best known as the author of "Central Europe" (English, 1903; German, 1904), the English edition, prepared by H. J. Mackinder, appearing in the series "The Regions of the World." This book was of particular value for its account of the physiography of the region which became the battle ground of Europe (1914, et seq.) and especially of the last chapter, "The Conditions of National Defense".

== Partial bibliography ==
- Physikalische Geographie von Griechenland, mit besonderer Rücksicht auf das Alterthum, Breslau 1885 – Physical Geography of Greece: With special regard to its antiquity.
- Philipp Clüver, der Begründer der historischen Länderkunde. Ein Beitrag zur Geschichte der geographischen Wissenschaft, Wien 1891 – Philipp Clüver, the founder of historical geography.
- Schlesien. Eine Landeskunde für das deutsche Volk auf wissenschaftlicher Grundlage, Breslau 1896 – Silesia: a geography for the German people.
- Mitteleuropa. Die Länder und Völker von den Westalpen und dem Balkan bis an den Kanal und das Kurische Haff, Gotha 1904 – Central Europe: the countries and peoples of the Western Alps and the Balkans, etc.
- Die Hohe Tatra zur Eiszeit, Leipzig 1923 – The High Tatras of the Ice Age.
