= Sophronia santolinae =

Scientific classification
- Domain: Eukaryota
- Kingdom: Animalia
- Phylum: Arthropoda
- Class: Insecta
- Order: Lepidoptera
- Family: Gelechiidae
- Genus: Sophronia
- Species: S. santolinae

Binomial name
- Sophronia santolinae Staudinger, 1863

Species of moth

Sophronia santolinae is a moth of the family Gelechiidae. It was described by Staudinger in 1863. It is found in Spain.

The larvae feed on Santolina rosmarinifolia.
