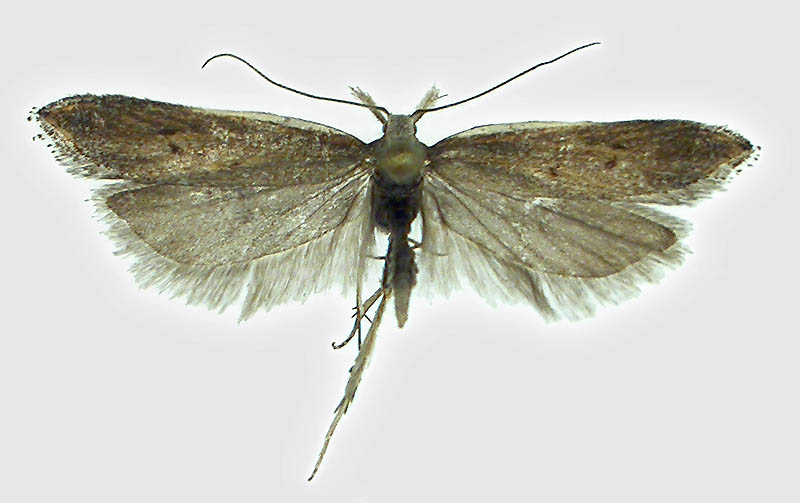

Scientific classification
- Kingdom: Animalia
- Phylum: Arthropoda
- Clade: Pancrustacea
- Class: Insecta
- Order: Lepidoptera
- Family: Gelechiidae
- Tribe: Gelechiini
- Genus: Sophronia; Hübner, [1825]

= Sophronia (moth) =

Genus of moths

Sophronia is a genus of moths in the family Gelechiidae.

== Species ==
- Sophronia acaudella Rebel, 1903
- Sophronia alaicella Caradja, 1920
- Sophronia albomarginata Li & Zheng, 1998
- Sophronia aquilex Meyrick, 1926
- Sophronia ascalis Gozmány, 1951
- Sophronia catharurga Meyrick, 1923
- Sophronia chilonella (Treitschke, 1833)
- Sophronia consanguinella Herrich-Schäffer, 1854
- Sophronia curonella Standfuss, 1884
- Sophronia finitimella Rebel, 1905
- Sophronia gelidella Nordmann, 1941
- Sophronia grandii Hering, 1933
- Sophronia humerella (Denis & Schiffermüller, 1775)
- Sophronia illustrella (Hübner, 1796)
- Sophronia marginella Toll, 1936
- Sophronia mediatrix Zeller, 1877
- Sophronia orientalis Li & Zheng, 1998
- Sophronia parahumerella Amsel, 1935
- Sophronia primella Busck, 1907
- Sophronia roseicrinella Busck, 1909
- Sophronia sagittans Meyrick, 1923
- Sophronia santolinae Staudinger, 1863
- Sophronia semicostella (Hübner, [1813])
- Sophronia sicariellus (Zeller, 1839)
- Sophronia teretracma Meyrick, 1927
