= Ostpreußenlied =

Regional anthem of East Prussia

Ostpreußenlied Prūsas Grīma / Prūsas Grēma
English: East Prussia Song
- Regional anthem of East Prussia
- Lyrics: Erich Hannighofer, 1930s
- Music: Herbert Brust, 1930
- Adopted: 1930s (as regional anthem)
- Relinquished: 1945
- Preceded by: Sie sagen all, du bist nicht schön

The "Ostpreußenlied", (Note: Old Prussian: "Prūsas Grīma" / "Prūsas Grēma" English: "East Prussia Song") also known as "Land der dunklen Wälder" (Note: Old Prussian: "Timran meddin/meddjan tāuta" English: "Land of Dark Forests") or "Lied auf Ostpreußen" (Note: Old Prussian: "Grīma stesse Prūsan" / "Grēma stesse Prūsan" English: "Song of East Prussia") was considered the regional anthem of East Prussia until 1945, when the lands of East Prussia were divided between the Soviet Union and the Polish People's Republic. The song is still used in reference to East Prussia.

== History ==
=== Origin ===
In the early 1930s, the composer from Königsberg (today Kaliningrad, Russia) Herbert Brust (born April 17, 1900, died June 26, 1968) composed the "Oratorium der Heimat" ("Oratory of the Fatherland"), and soon after it was made, at the suggestion of Königsberger Hartungsche Zeitung, Brust requested the writer Erich Hannighofer to add lyrics to the song, of which Hanninghofer made four stanzas.

The result of the combination, now called Ostpreußenland, garnered significant interest, allowing it to replace "Sie sagen all, du bist nicht schön".

=== Development ===
In 1933, the song was played on Ostmarken Rundfunk AG, not under the name "Ostpreußenland", but under "Ostpreußenlied"; meaning the name was the one primarily used by the East Prussians.

At the time, nationalism was on the rise in Germany, and so, it became an important symbol of both East Prussian and German identity, and its popularity increased. It also rose in popularity due to its connection with the landscape in general.

After and because of the exile of Germans from East Prussia, one more stanza started to appear in 1945; but not by Hannighofer. He was already missing on that year's January 1.

Although East Prussia ceased to exist as a German territory in 1945, the song lives on. It has continued to be significant for the displaced and their descendants, and is often used in contexts where the lost homeland is remembered and honored. Organizations such as the Landsmannschaft Ostpreußen, an association of displaced East Prussians; have played an important role in preserving and spreading the song as part of the collective memory of East Prussia, especially among the descendants of those who were displaced and who now live in Germany.

== Lyrics ==
	German original	English translation
1.	Land der dunklen Wälder; Und kristall'nen Seen, Über weite Felder; Lichte Wunder geh'n	Land of Somber forests And crystal-clear lakes Across wide-open plains Vivid wonders occur.
2.	Starke Bauern schreiten Hinter Pferd und Pflug, Über Ackerbreiten; Streift der Vogelzug.	Strong plowmen are striding Behind steed and plow. All across the farmland The migratory birds fly.
3.	Und die Meere rauschen Den Choral der Zeit; Elche steh'n und lauschen In die Ewigkeit.	And the Seas are roaring The choral of time, Elks stand and listen Into eternity.
4.	Tag ist aufgegangen über Haff und Moor, Licht hat angefangen, Steigt im Ost empor.	The day has broken, Across lagoon and moor, The light has risen Rising in the east.
5.	Heimat wohlgeborgen Zwischen Strand und Strom, Blühe heut' und morgen Unterm Friedensdom.	Home safe and sound, Between beach and stream, Bloom today and tomorrow Under the dome of peace.

Sometimes, the third and fourth verses are swapped from the order of 3–4, to the order of 4–3. If the 5th verse is added, it is common to put in the middle of the two swapped verses (if they are swapped in the first place), making the order of 4–5–3.

=== Prussian translation ===
In 1993, Ostpreußenlied was translated into Old Prussian by Mikkels Klussis with the name Prūsas Grīma, as part of the revival movement for the language. Today there are two versions of said translation, with slight differences in orthography (and thus, also differences in pronunciation):

	Original Version	Leītawas Prūsiska Pēra	English translation
1.	Timran meddin tāuta Eīskun azzaran Kīrša plattun laūkan Swāiksti Pāitaran.	Timran meddjan tāuta Eīskun azzaran Kīrsa plattun laūkan Swāiksti pāitaran.	Land of dark forests Clear lakes Across broad fields Pleiades shines.
2.	Kīrša pelkins, teīnan Austrā jāu etskīt Tīt pagaūne dēinan Skīstan swāikstan, tīt.	Kīrsa pelkins, teīnan Āustra jāu etskīt Tēt pagaūnja dēinan Skīstan swāikstan, tēt.	Now, between the marshes Dawn has already risen Thus the day starts So purely, light (shines).
3.	Treppa spārtai būrai, Pas plūgan dei ēit, Be en dāngu dūrai Pippelka jāu skreīt.	Treppa spārtai būrai, Pas plūgan dei ēit, Be en dāngu dūrai Pippelka jāu skreīt.	The farmers strongly step, After they plough their walk And in the cowardly sky Small birds (already) fly.
4.	Jūris tenna grīmuns Iz deiwūtiskwan, Braīdis enklausīwuns Ēn prabūtiskwan.	Jūris tenna grēmuns Iz deiwūtiskwan, Braīdis enklausīwuns Ēn Prabūtiskwan.	The sea continues singing Out of bliss, Elks are (in) listening Into eternity.

== Links ==
Ostpreußenlied on YouTube

Prūsas Grīma on YouTube
