= Sophronia roseicrinella =

Scientific classification
- Domain: Eukaryota
- Kingdom: Animalia
- Phylum: Arthropoda
- Class: Insecta
- Order: Lepidoptera
- Family: Gelechiidae
- Genus: Sophronia
- Species: S. roseicrinella

Binomial name
- Sophronia roseicrinella Busck, 1909

Species of moth

Sophronia roseicrinella is a moth of the family Gelechiidae. It was described by August Busck in 1909. It is found in North America, where it has been recorded Texas.

The wingspan is about 15 mm. The forewings are with the rosy-white ground color strongly overlaid with brown and fuscous scales, especially on the dorsal half and towards the apex. On the middle of the costa begins an outwardly strongly oblique, ill-defined, brown shade. There is a narrow, strongly outwardly angulated, spear-formed fascia of unmottled rosy white at the apical third, edged towards the base of the wing with dark scales. The apical third of the wing, outside the fascia is neatly mottled with black on white ground and just before the sharp-pointed apex is a small black round dot. The hindwings are whitish fuscous.
