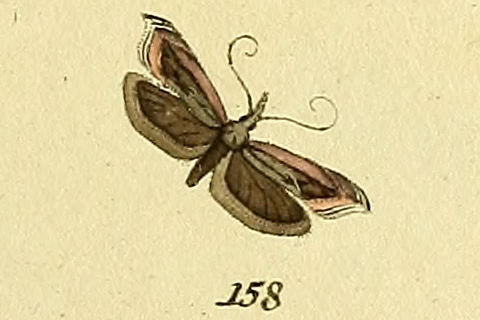

Scientific classification
- Kingdom: Animalia
- Phylum: Arthropoda
- Clade: Pancrustacea
- Class: Insecta
- Order: Lepidoptera
- Family: Gelechiidae
- Genus: Sophronia
- Species: S. illustrella

Binomial name
- Sophronia illustrella (Hübner, 1796)

Synonyms
- Tinea illustrella Hübner, 1796

= Sophronia illustrella =

Species of moth

Sophronia illustrella is a moth of the family Gelechiidae. It was described by Jacob Hübner in 1796. It is found in Italy, Austria, the Czech Republic, Slovakia, Bosnia and Herzegovina, Albania, Hungary, Romania, the Caucasus and Asia Minor.
