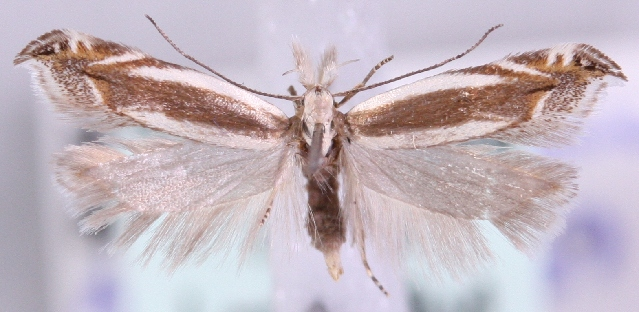

Scientific classification
- Domain: Eukaryota
- Kingdom: Animalia
- Phylum: Arthropoda
- Class: Insecta
- Order: Lepidoptera
- Family: Gelechiidae
- Genus: Sophronia
- Species: S. chilonella

Binomial name
- Sophronia chilonella (Treitschke, 1833)

Synonyms
- Harpipterix chilonella Treitschke, 1833

= Sophronia chilonella =

Species of moth

Sophronia chilonella is a species of moth in the family Gelechiidae, originally described by Treitschke in 1833. It is found in Spain, France, Italy, Germany, Denmark, Austria, the Czech Republic, Slovakia, Hungary, Poland, Norway, Sweden, the Baltic region, Russia, Ukraine, Belarus and Greece.

The wingspan is 11–13 mm.

The larvae feed on Artemisia campestris.
