= Ludwig Goldstein =

German art historian and journalist (1867–1943)

- Born: Louis Goldstein; 10 November 1867; Königsberg, Prussia
- Died: 1943 (aged 75–76); Königsberg, Prussia
- Occupation(s): Art historian, journalist
- Known for: Opposing censorship of Spring Awakening by Frank Wedekind; leadership in the Königsberg Goethe Association
- Notable work: Ein Menschenleben (1934), Heimatgebunden (published posthumously in 2015)
- Spouse: Wilhelmine Luise Goldman
- Parent(s): Bernhard Goldstein (father); Marie Retty (mother)

Ludwig Goldstein, born Louis Goldstein (10 November 1867 in Königsberg - 1943 in Königsberg) was a German art historian and journalist.

== Life ==
Goldstein, son of the master tailor Bernhard Goldstein and Marie Retty, who had converted to Judaism, studied German, art history and Indology at the Albertus University of Königsberg and, after completing his military service, received his doctorate in 1896 with a thesis on Moses Mendelssohn. In 1899, he became a contributor to the arts and local sections of the Hartungsche Zeitung. For over 27 years, from 1906 to 1933, he was the arts editor of the nationally respected newspaper, which was closed after the National Socialists took power due to the changed political situation. Ludwig Goldstein became known nationwide through his decisive stance against censorship when a performance of the play Spring Awakening by Frank Wedekind was banned in 1910.

In 1901, Ludwig Goldstein was one of the founders of the Königsberg Goethe Association, which over a thousand citizens joined in the first year of its existence. From 1906 to 1929, Ludwig Goldstein was chairman of the Goethe Association and in this position promoted both the understanding of literary and artistic modernism and, on numerous excursions, the general interest in architectural monuments and the regional history embodied in them. Since anti-Semitism was very strong in Königsberg, Goldstein was forced out of this position as early as 1929. Shortly after the Nazis seized power, in March 1933, the Hartungsche Zeitung withdrew all journalistic assignments from its former editor-in-chief because he was declared a "half-Jew" by the new rulers, despite his lack of religious affiliation. For financial reasons, he had to withdraw from membership of the Goethe Society in Weimar, of which he was one of the most important members in Königsberg. However, the society granted him a "sponsorship" so that he could remain a member; he was expelled in 1939, although this was not required in the case of "half-Jews".

In 1934, Goldstein published an autobiographical book entitled Ein Menschenleben. He spent the last years of his life in seclusion in Königsberg. He then wrote a report entitled Heimatgebunden during National Socialism about his life and his experiences in Königsberg during the Nazi era, which was not intended for publication. This report is one of the few sources still in existence that provide information about the persecution of Königsberg's Jews from around 1936 to 1940, and was only published in 2015. Under the impression of the persecution of the Jews, many of Goldstein's former friends turned away; his marriage to his non-Jewish wife Wilhelmine Luise Goldman, whom he had married in Königsberg in 1905, saved him from deportation to his death. The date of death is usually given as 1943. However, a contemporary dates Goldstein's death to 12 July 1944.
