= Sophronia humerella =

Scientific classification
- Domain: Eukaryota
- Kingdom: Animalia
- Phylum: Arthropoda
- Class: Insecta
- Order: Lepidoptera
- Family: Gelechiidae
- Genus: Sophronia
- Species: S. humerella

Binomial name
- Sophronia humerella (Denis & Schiffermüller, 1775)

Synonyms
- Tinea humerella Denis & Schiffermüller, 1775

Species of moth

Sophronia humerella is a moth of the family Gelechiidae. It was described by Michael Denis and Ignaz Schiffermüller in 1775. It is found in Europe (except Iceland, Norway, Ireland, the Netherlands, Croatia, Slovenia and Bulgaria), North Africa and Asia Minor. The moth was removed from the British list because the records are considered unreliable.

The wingspan is 9–11 mm.

The larvae feed on Artemisia campestris, Helichrysum, Achillea, Thymus vulgaris and Antennaria species.
