= Sophronia marginella =

Scientific classification
- Kingdom: Animalia
- Phylum: Arthropoda
- Clade: Pancrustacea
- Class: Insecta
- Order: Lepidoptera
- Family: Gelechiidae
- Genus: Sophronia
- Species: S. marginella

Binomial name
- Sophronia marginella Toll, 1936

Species of moth

Sophronia marginella is a moth of the family Gelechiidae. It was described by Sergiusz Toll in 1936. It is found in Ukraine.
