= Max Standfuss =

German-Swiss entomologist

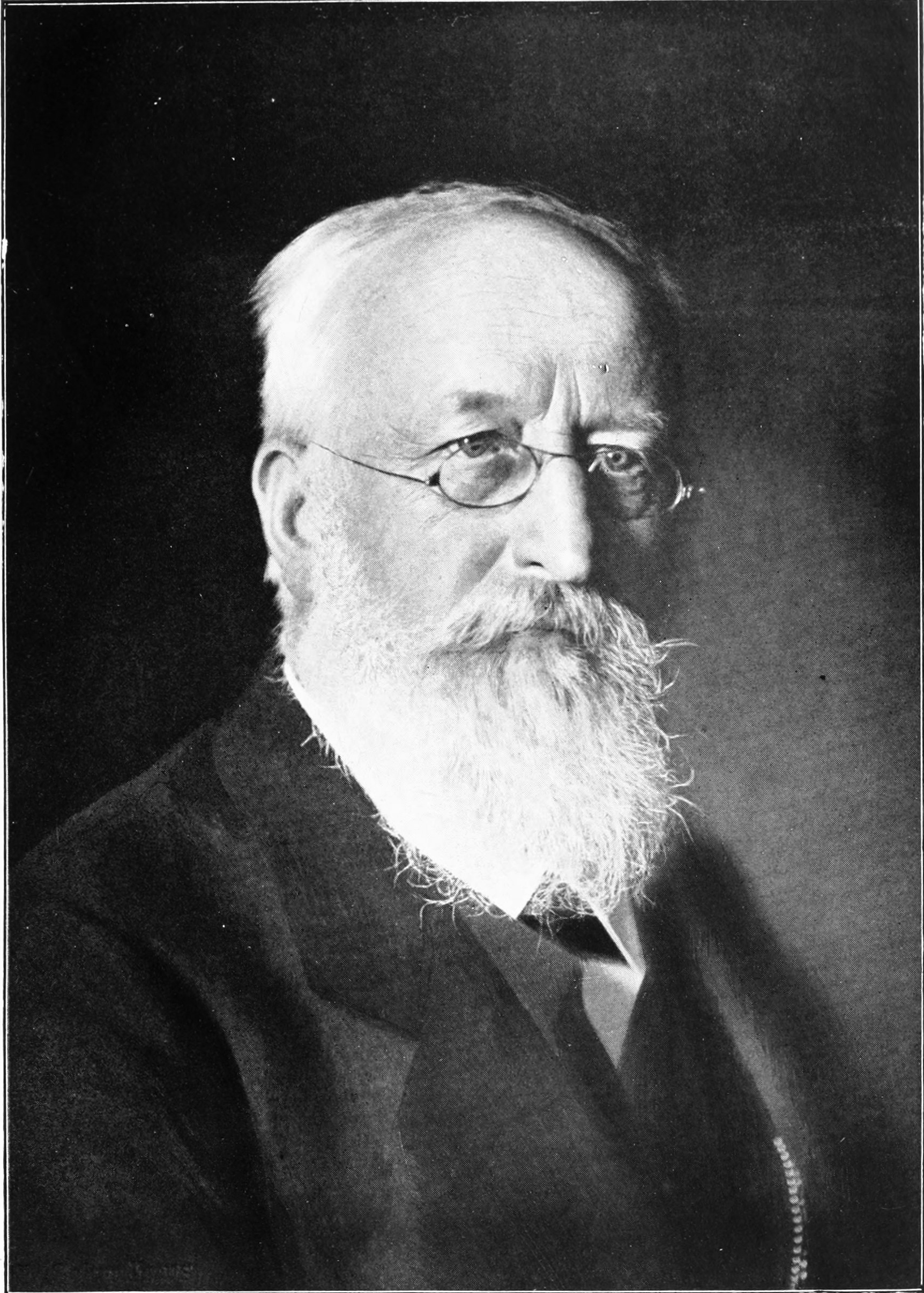
Max Standfuss

Maximilian Rudolph Standfuss (6 June 1854, Schreiberhau – 22 January 1917, Zürich) was a German-Swiss entomologist specializing in Lepidoptera.

He studied theology at the University of Halle and natural sciences at the University of Breslau, where in 1879 he received his PhD in zoology. For many years, he was curator, and later director, of the collections at the entomological museum of Eidgenössische Polytechnikum in Zürich. In 1892 he obtained his habilitation and he subsequently worked as a lecturer at the Polytechnic and at the University of Zürich. In 1915 he received the title of professor. In 1908–10 he served as president of the Naturforschenden Gesellschaft in Zürich.

He is best remembered for his breeding experiments with butterflies and moths under artificial conditions; e.g. taking the cocoons of central European butterflies and breeding them at various temperatures. He discovered that when the temperature was very low, the butterfly emerged from the cocoon with a coloration that was different from the central European species, but similar to varieties of that species found in colder climates — when the temperature was high, the same European cocoons produced varieties that were to be found in tropical regions.

== Selected works ==
- Lepidopterologisches, 1884 – Lepidopterology.
- Handbuch für Sammler der europäischen Grossschmetterlinge, 1891 – Manual for collectors of Macrolepidoptera.
- Handbuch der paläarktischen Gross-Schmetterlinge für Forscher und Sammler, 1896 – Manual of Palaearctic Macrolepidoptera for researchers and collectors
- Experimentelle zoologische Studien mit Lepidopteren, 1898 – Experimental zoological studies of Lepidoptera.
