= Bruno Wille =

German politician

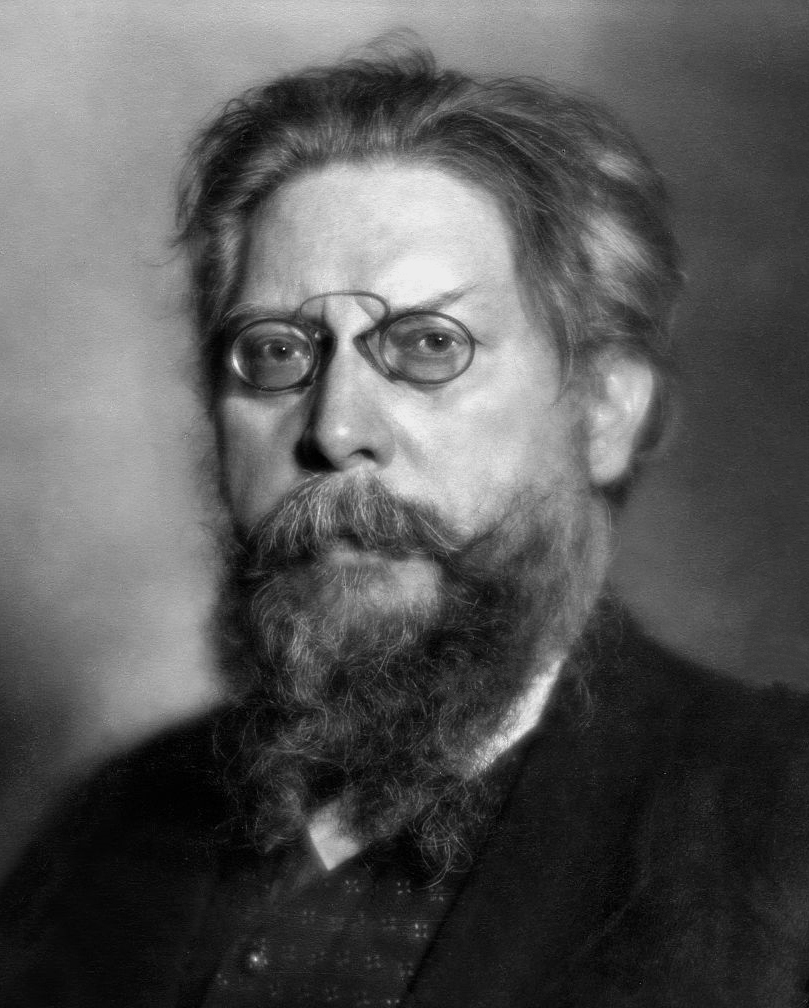
- Bruno Wille by Nicola Perscheid c. 1900
- Born: February 6, 1860; Magdeburg
- Died: August 31, 1928 (aged 68); Lindau
- Occupations: Politician, writer and journalist
- Spouse(s): Auguste Krüger (1890–1920); Emmy W. Friedländer (1920–1928)

Bruno Wille (6 February 1860 – 31 August 1928) was a German politician, writer and journalist. He was born in Magdeburg, and died in Aeschach near Lindau.

== Life and career ==
He tried to make an end to the collective ideology of the Social Democratic Party of Germany (SPD) from 1890 until 1892. Influenced by Friedrich Nietzsche, he wanted to end the tyranny of political parties and protect individuality. He considered that politics should help develop a personality and not subdue it.

He was the leader of the radical youth opposition of the SPD. He did not have much support and had to leave the party in 1892. From that moment onwards, he regarded himself as an anarchist.

In 1896 he published an account of his visits to Joseph Dietzgen in Siegburg, in which he speaks of the philosopher with great respect.

He moved away from his anarchist viewpoint: Instead of complete egoism, he became an advocate of the harmony of a community of humans. He became a great admirer of nature and wanted to become one with the world, which he regarded as an organism.

He was a supporter of the Christ Myth Theory (which had prominence in the late 19th and early 20th century in Germany, due to the Deutsche Monistenbund and rising prominence of mythicist figures such as Kalthoff, who also led to the rediscovery of Bruno Bauer).

== Bibliography ==
Die Christusmythe als monistische Weltanschauung (Ein Wort zur Verständigung zwischen Religion und Wissenschaft) Erste Ausgabe (Berlin: Vita Deutsches Verlagshaus, 1903)
