= Tosirips magyarus =

Scientific classification
- Kingdom: Animalia
- Phylum: Arthropoda
- Class: Insecta
- Order: Lepidoptera
- Family: Tortricidae
- Genus: Tosirips
- Species: T. magyarus

Binomial name
- Tosirips magyarus Razowski, 1987

Species of moth

Tosirips magyarus is a species of moth of the family Tortricidae. It is found in Romania, Bulgaria, Serbia, Slovenia, Hungary, Italy and on Corsica. It is also found in Syria.

The wingspan is 14–19 mm for males and 17–21 mm for females. Adults are on wing in May and June.

The larvae feed on Quercus robur.

== Subspecies ==
- Tosirips magyarus magyarus (Europe)
- Tosirips magyarus syriacus Razowski, 1987 (Syria)
