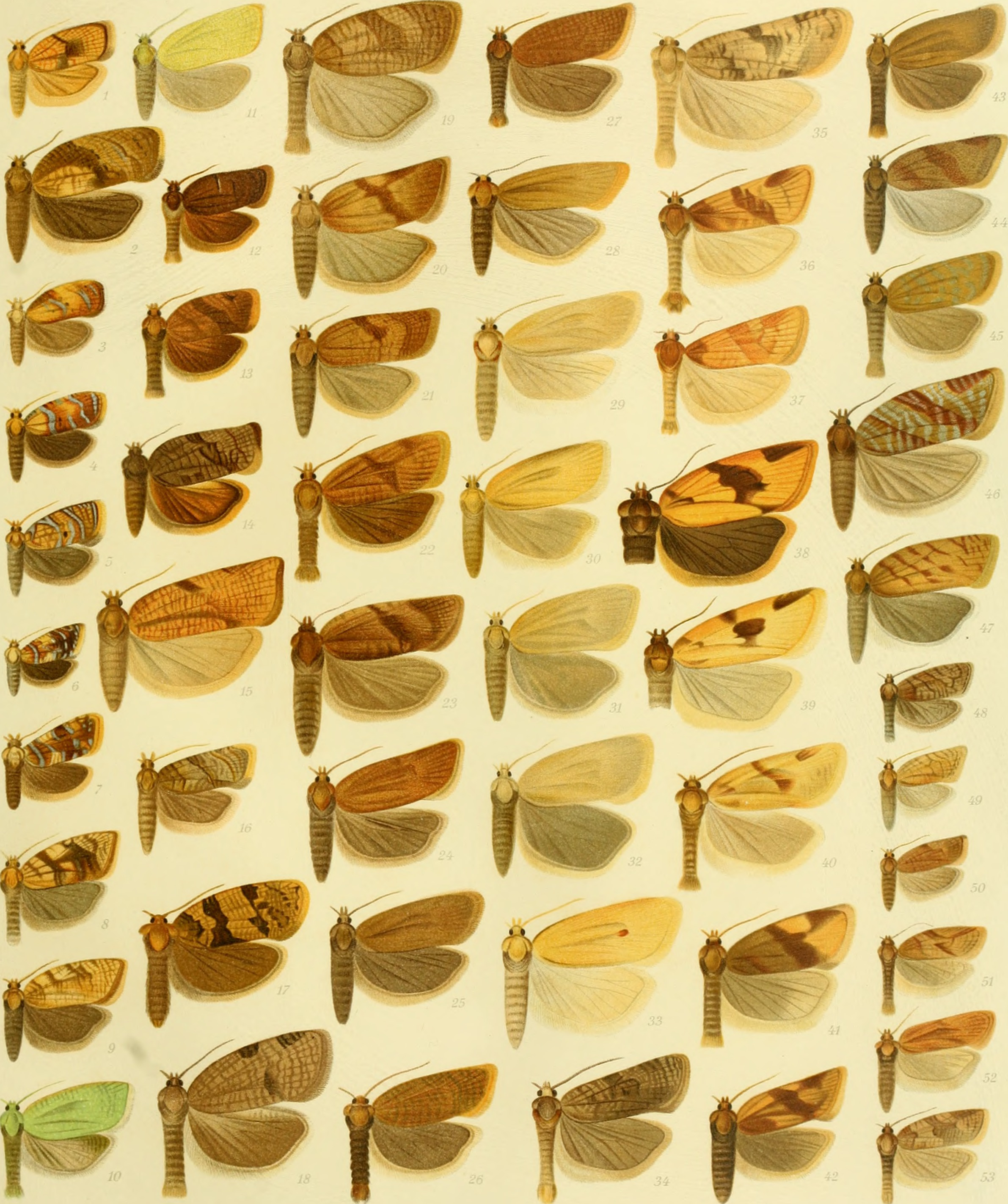
- Tosirips perpulchrana in Kennel Die palaearktischen tortriciden figure 17 female type

Scientific classification
- Domain: Eukaryota
- Kingdom: Animalia
- Phylum: Arthropoda
- Class: Insecta
- Order: Lepidoptera
- Family: Tortricidae
- Tribe: Archipini
- Genus: Tosirips; Razowski, 1987

= Tosirips =

Genus of tortrix moths

Tosirips is a genus of moths of the tribe Archipini.

== Species ==
- Tosirips magyarus Razowski, 1987
- Tosirips perpulchrana Kennel, 1901
