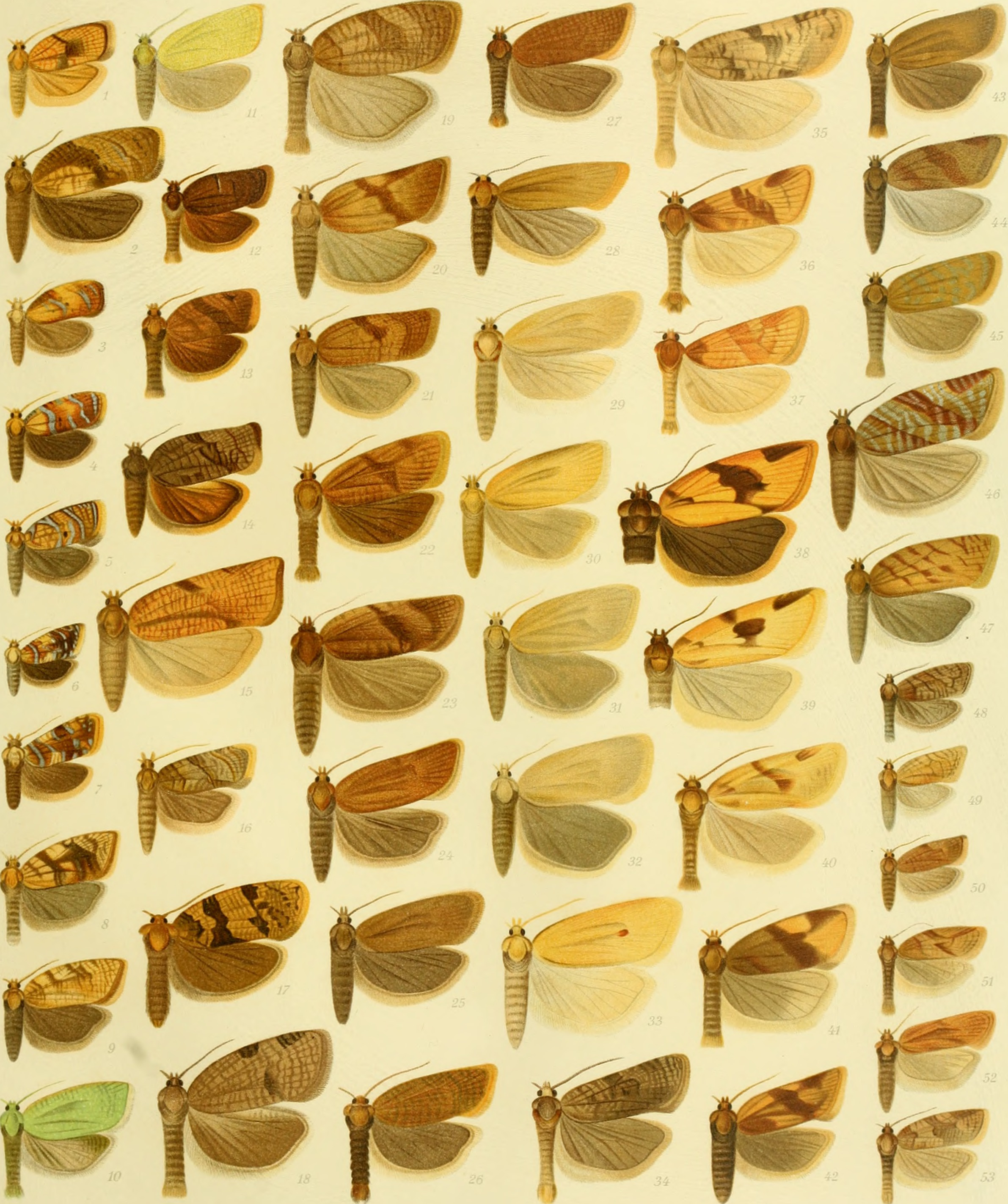
- Tosirips perpulchrana in Kennel Die palaearktischen tortriciden figure 17 female type

Scientific classification
- Domain: Eukaryota
- Kingdom: Animalia
- Phylum: Arthropoda
- Class: Insecta
- Order: Lepidoptera
- Family: Tortricidae
- Genus: Tosirips
- Species: T. perpulchrana

Binomial name
- Tosirips perpulchrana (Kennel, 1901)

Synonyms
- Tortrix perpulchrana Kennel, 1901; Tosirips perpulchranus

= Tosirips perpulchrana =

Species of moth

Tosirips perpulchrana is a moth of the family Tortricidae. It is found in the Russian Far East (Amur, Siberia), north-eastern China (Heilongjiang, Jilin, Liaoning), Korea, Japan and Taiwan.

The wingspan is 19–21 mm for males and 25–27 mm for females. Adults are on wing in June.

The larvae feed on Salix koreensis.

== Subspecies ==
- Tosirips perpulchrana perpulchrana (Russian Far East, north-eastern China, Korea and Taiwan)
- Tosirips perpulchrana ceramus Razowski, 1987 (Japan)
