= List of moths of Metropolitan France (A–C) =

Partial list of moths in Metropolitan France

This is a list of moths of families starting from A to C that are found in Metropolitan France (including Corsica). It also acts as an index to the species articles and forms part of the full List of Lepidoptera of Metropolitan France.

== Family Adelidae ==
- Adela albicinctella Mann, 1852
- Adela australis (Heydenreich, 1851)
- Adela croesella (Scopoli, 1763)
- Adela cuprella (Denis & Schiffermuller, 1775)
- Adela mazzolella (Hübner, 1801)
- Adela paludicolella Zeller, 1850
- Adela reaumurella (Linnaeus, 1758)
- Adela violella (Denis & Schiffermuller, 1775)
- Cauchas albiantennella (Burmann, 1943)
- Cauchas fibulella (Denis & Schiffermuller, 1775)
- Cauchas leucocerella (Scopoli, 1763)
- Cauchas rufifrontella (Treitschke, 1833)
- Cauchas rufimitrella (Scopoli, 1763)
- Nematopogon adansoniella (Villers, 1789)
- Nematopogon metaxella (Hübner, 1813)
- Nematopogon pilella (Denis & Schiffermuller, 1775)
- Nematopogon robertella (Clerck, 1759)
- Nematopogon schwarziellus Zeller, 1839
- Nematopogon swammerdamella (Linnaeus, 1758)
- Nemophora associatella (Zeller, 1839)
- Nemophora barbatellus (Zeller, 1847)
- Nemophora congruella (Zeller, 1839)
- Nemophora cupriacella (Hübner, 1819)
- Nemophora degeerella (Linnaeus, 1758)
- Nemophora dumerilella (Duponchel, 1839)
- Nemophora fasciella (Fabricius, 1775)
- Nemophora metallica (Poda, 1761)
- Nemophora minimella (Denis & Schiffermuller, 1775)
- Nemophora mollella (Hübner, 1813)
- Nemophora ochsenheimerella (Hübner, 1813)
- Nemophora pfeifferella (Hübner, 1813)
- Nemophora prodigellus (Zeller, 1853)
- Nemophora raddaella (Hübner, 1793)
- Nemophora violellus (Herrich-Schaffer in Stainton, 1851)

== Family Alucitidae ==
- Alucita bidentata Scholz & Jackh, 1994
- Alucita cancellata (Meyrick, 1908)
- Alucita cymatodactyla Zeller, 1852
- Alucita desmodactyla Zeller, 1847
- Alucita grammodactyla Zeller, 1841
- Alucita hexadactyla Linnaeus, 1758
- Alucita huebneri Wallengren, 1859
- Alucita palodactyla Zeller, 1847
- Alucita tridentata Scholz & Jackh, 1994
- Alucita zonodactyla Zeller, 1847
- Pterotopteryx dodecadactyla Hübner, 1813

== Family Argyresthiidae ==
- Argyresthia abdominalis Zeller, 1839
- Argyresthia albistria (Haworth, 1828)
- Argyresthia aurulentella Stainton, 1849
- Argyresthia bonnetella (Linnaeus, 1758)
- Argyresthia brockeella (Hübner, 1813)
- Argyresthia conjugella Zeller, 1839
- Argyresthia curvella (Linnaeus, 1761)
- Argyresthia fundella (Fischer von Röslerstamm, 1835)
- Argyresthia glaucinella Zeller, 1839
- Argyresthia goedartella (Linnaeus, 1758)
- Argyresthia ivella (Haworth, 1828)
- Argyresthia pruniella (Clerck, 1759)
- Argyresthia pulchella Lienig & Zeller, 1846
- Argyresthia pygmaeella (Denis & Schiffermuller, 1775)
- Argyresthia retinella Zeller, 1839
- Argyresthia semifusca (Haworth, 1828)
- Argyresthia semitestacella (Curtis, 1833)
- Argyresthia sorbiella (Treitschke, 1833)
- Argyresthia spinosella Stainton, 1849
- Argyresthia submontana Frey, 1871
- Argyresthia amiantella (Zeller, 1847)
- Argyresthia arceuthina Zeller, 1839
- Argyresthia bergiella (Ratzeburg, 1840)
- Argyresthia buvati Gibeaux, 1992
- Argyresthia chrysidella Peyerimhoff, 1877
- Argyresthia dilectella Zeller, 1847
- Argyresthia glabratella (Zeller, 1847)
- Argyresthia illuminatella Zeller, 1839
- Argyresthia laevigatella Herrich-Schaffer, 1855
- Argyresthia praecocella Zeller, 1839
- Argyresthia reticulata Staudinger, 1877
- Argyresthia thuriferana Gibeaux, 1992
- Argyresthia trifasciata Staudinger, 1871

== Family Autostichidae ==
- Apatema impunctella Amsel, 1940
- Apatema mediopallidum Walsingham, 1900
- Aprominta cryptogamarum (Milliere, 1872)
- Deroxena venosulella (Moschler, 1862)
- Donaspastus delicatella (Walsingham, 1901)
- Dysspastus fallax (Gozmany, 1961)
- Dysspastus perpygmaeella (Walsingham, 1901)
- Holcopogon bubulcellus (Staudinger, 1859)
- Oegoconia caradjai Popescu-Gorj & Capuse, 1965
- Oegoconia deauratella (Herrich-Schaffer, 1854)
- Oegoconia huemeri Sutter, 2007
- Oegoconia novimundi (Busck, 1915)
- Oegoconia quadripuncta (Haworth, 1828)
- Oegoconia uralskella Popescu-Gorj & Capuse, 1965
- Stibaromacha ratella (Herrich-Schaffer, 1854)
- Symmoca caliginella Mann, 1867
- Symmoca cinerariella (Mann, 1859)
- Symmoca oenophila Staudinger, 1871
- Symmoca orphnella Rebel, 1893
- Symmoca signatella Herrich-Schaffer, 1854
- Symmoca signella (Hübner, 1796)
- Symmocoides oxybiella (Milliere, 1872)
- Telephirca quadrifariella (Mann, 1855)

== Family Batrachedridae ==
- Batrachedra parvulipunctella Chretien, 1915
- Batrachedra pinicolella (Zeller, 1839)
- Batrachedra praeangusta (Haworth, 1828)

== Family Bedelliidae ==
- Bedellia ehikella Szocs, 1967
- Bedellia somnulentella (Zeller, 1847)

== Family Blastobasidae ==
- Blastobasis phycidella (Zeller, 1839)
- Hypatopa binotella (Thunberg, 1794)
- Hypatopa inunctella Zeller, 1839
- Hypatopa segnella (Zeller, 1873)
- Neoblastobasis ligurica Nel & Varenne, 2004
- Tecmerium anthophaga (Staudinger, 1870)
- Tecmerium mnemosynella (Milliere, 1876)
- Tecmerium rosmarinella (Walsingham, 1901)

== Family Brachodidae ==
- Brachodes funebris (Feisthamel, 1833)
- Brachodes laeta (Staudinger, 1863)

== Family Brahmaeidae ==
- Lemonia dumi (Linnaeus, 1761)
- Lemonia taraxaci (Denis & Schiffermuller, 1775)

== Family Bucculatricidae ==
- Bucculatrix absinthii Gartner, 1865
- Bucculatrix alaternella Constant, 1890
- Bucculatrix albedinella (Zeller, 1839)
- Bucculatrix albella Stainton, 1867
- Bucculatrix albiguttella Milliere, 1886
- Bucculatrix alpina Frey, 1870
- Bucculatrix argentisignella Herrich-Schaffer, 1855
- Bucculatrix artemisiella Herrich-Schaffer, 1855
- Bucculatrix bechsteinella (Bechstein & Scharfenberg, 1805)
- Bucculatrix cantabricella Chretien, 1898
- Bucculatrix cidarella (Zeller, 1839)
- Bucculatrix clavenae Klimesch, 1950
- Bucculatrix cristatella (Zeller, 1839)
- Bucculatrix demaryella (Duponchel, 1840)
- Bucculatrix diffusella Menhofer, 1943
- Bucculatrix fatigatella Heyden, 1863
- Bucculatrix frangutella (Goeze, 1783)
- Bucculatrix gnaphaliella (Treitschke, 1833)
- Bucculatrix helichrysella Constant, 1889
- Bucculatrix humiliella Herrich-Schaffer, 1855
- Bucculatrix lavaterella Milliere, 1865
- Bucculatrix maritima Stainton, 1851
- Bucculatrix myricae Ragonot, 1879
- Bucculatrix nigricomella (Zeller, 1839)
- Bucculatrix orophilella Nel, 1999
- Bucculatrix pyrenaica Nel & Varenne, 2004
- Bucculatrix ratisbonensis Stainton, 1861
- Bucculatrix santolinella Walsingham, 1898
- Bucculatrix thoracella (Thunberg, 1794)
- Bucculatrix ulmella Zeller, 1848

== Family Castniidae ==
- Paysandisia archon (Burmeister, 1880)

== Family Chimabachidae ==
- Dasystoma salicella (Hübner, 1796)
- Diurnea fagella (Denis & Schiffermuller, 1775)
- Diurnea lipsiella (Denis & Schiffermuller, 1775)

== Family Choreutidae ==
- Anthophila fabriciana (Linnaeus, 1767)
- Choreutis diana (Hübner, 1822)
- Choreutis nemorana (Hübner, 1799)
- Choreutis pariana (Clerck, 1759)
- Prochoreutis holotoxa (Meyrick, 1903)
- Prochoreutis myllerana (Fabricius, 1794)
- Prochoreutis sehestediana (Fabricius, 1776)
- Prochoreutis stellaris (Zeller, 1847)
- Tebenna bjerkandrella (Thunberg, 1784)
- Tebenna micalis (Mann, 1857)
- Tebenna pretiosana (Duponchel, 1842)

== Family Cimeliidae ==
- Axia margarita (Hübner, 1813)
- Axia napoleona Schawerda, 1926

== Family Coleophoridae ==
- Augasma aeratella (Zeller, 1839)
- Coleophora absinthii Wocke, 1877
- Coleophora absinthivora Baldizzone, 1990
- Coleophora achaenivora Hofmann, 1877
- Coleophora acrisella Milliere, 1872
- Coleophora acutiphaga Baldizzone, 1982
- Coleophora adelogrammella Zeller, 1849
- Coleophora adjectella Hering, 1937
- Coleophora adjunctella Hodgkinson, 1882
- Coleophora adspersella Benander, 1939
- Coleophora aestuariella Bradley, 1984
- Coleophora afrosarda Baldizzone & Kaltenbach, 1983
- Coleophora ahenella Heinemann, 1877
- Coleophora albella (Thunberg, 1788)
- Coleophora albicans Zeller, 1849
- Coleophora albicella Constant, 1885
- Coleophora albicosta (Haworth, 1828)
- Coleophora albicostella (Duponchel, 1842)
- Coleophora albidella (Denis & Schiffermuller, 1775)
- Coleophora albilineella Toll, 1960
- Coleophora albitarsella Zeller, 1849
- Coleophora albulae Frey, 1880
- Coleophora alcyonipennella (Kollar, 1832)
- Coleophora algidella Staudinger, 1857
- Coleophora alnifoliae Barasch, 1934
- Coleophora alticolella Zeller, 1849
- Coleophora altivagella Toll, 1952
- Coleophora amellivora Baldizzone, 1979
- Coleophora amethystinella Ragonot, 1855
- Coleophora anatipenella (Hübner, 1796)
- Coleophora anitella Baldizzone, 1985
- Coleophora antennariella Herrich-Schaffer, 1861
- Coleophora arctostaphyli Meder, 1934
- Coleophora argenteonivea Walsingham, 1907
- Coleophora argentula (Stephens, 1834)
- Coleophora artemisicolella Bruand, 1855
- Coleophora asteris Muhlig, 1864
- Coleophora asthenella Constant, 1893
- Coleophora astragalella Zeller, 1849
- Coleophora atriplicis Meyrick, 1928
- Coleophora auricella (Fabricius, 1794)
- Coleophora ballotella (Fischer v. Röslerstamm, 1839)
- Coleophora bassii Baldizzone, 1989
- Coleophora betulella Heinemann, 1877
- Coleophora bifrondella Walsingham, 1891
- Coleophora bilineatella Zeller, 1849
- Coleophora bilineella Herrich-Schaffer, 1855
- Coleophora binderella (Kollar, 1832)
- Coleophora binotapennella (Duponchel, 1843)
- Coleophora brevipalpella Wocke, 1874
- Coleophora brunneosignata Toll, 1944
- Coleophora burmanni Toll, 1952
- Coleophora caelebipennella Zeller, 1839
- Coleophora caespititiella Zeller, 1839
- Coleophora calycotomella Stainton, 1869
- Coleophora cecidophorella Oudejans, 1972
- Coleophora centaureivora Baldizzone, 1998
- Coleophora chalcogrammella Zeller, 1839
- Coleophora chamaedriella Bruand, 1852
- Coleophora chretieni Baldizzone, 1979
- Coleophora ciconiella Herrich-Schaffer, 1855
- Coleophora cinerea Toll, 1953
- Coleophora clypeiferella Hofmann, 1871
- Coleophora colutella (Fabricius, 1794)
- Coleophora congeriella Staudinger, 1859
- Coleophora conspicuella Zeller, 1849
- Coleophora conyzae Zeller, 1868
- Coleophora coracipennella (Hübner, 1796)
- Coleophora cornutella Herrich-Schaffer, 1861
- Coleophora coronillae Zeller, 1849
- Coleophora corsicella Walsingham, 1898
- Coleophora coxi Baldizzone & van der Wolf, 2007
- Coleophora cracella (Vallot, 1835)
- Coleophora currucipennella Zeller, 1839
- Coleophora cyrniella Rebel, 1926
- Coleophora deauratella Lienig & Zeller, 1846
- Coleophora delmastroella Baldizzone, 2000
- Coleophora dentiferella Toll, 1952
- Coleophora deviella Zeller, 1847
- Coleophora dianthi Herrich-Schaffer, 1855
- Coleophora dianthivora Walsingham, 1901
- Coleophora didymella Chretien, 1899
- Coleophora dignella Toll, 1961
- Coleophora directella Zeller, 1849
- Coleophora discordella Zeller, 1849
- Coleophora ditella Zeller, 1849
- Coleophora dubiella Baker, 1888
- Coleophora eupepla Gozmany, 1954
- Coleophora eupreta Walsingham, 1907
- Coleophora femorella Walsingham, 1898
- Coleophora flaviella Mann, 1857
- Coleophora flavipennella (Duponchel, 1843)
- Coleophora follicularis (Vallot, 1802)
- Coleophora fringillella Zeller, 1839
- Coleophora frischella (Linnaeus, 1758)
- Coleophora fuscocuprella Herrich-Schaffer, 1855
- Coleophora fuscolineata Walsingham, 1898
- Coleophora galatellae Hering, 1942
- Coleophora galbulipennella Zeller, 1838
- Coleophora gallipennella (Hübner, 1796)
- Coleophora gardesanella Toll, 1954
- Coleophora gaviaepennella Toll, 1952
- Coleophora genistae Stainton, 1857
- Coleophora glaucicolella Wood, 1892
- Coleophora gnaphalii Zeller, 1839
- Coleophora granulatella Zeller, 1849
- Coleophora gryphipennella (Hübner, 1796)
- Coleophora halophilella Zimmermann, 1926
- Coleophora helianthemella Milliere, 1870
- Coleophora helichrysiella Krone, 1909
- Coleophora hemerobiella (Scopoli, 1763)
- Coleophora hermanniella Walsingham, 1898
- Coleophora hieronella Zeller, 1849
- Coleophora hospitiella Chretien, 1915
- Coleophora hyssopi Toll, 1961
- Coleophora ibipennella Zeller, 1849
- Coleophora idaeella Hofmann, 1869
- Coleophora insulicola Toll, 1942
- Coleophora inulae Wocke, 1877
- Coleophora involucrella Chretien, 1905
- Coleophora iperspinata Baldizzone & Nel, 2003
- Coleophora juncicolella Stainton, 1851
- Coleophora jynxella Baldizzone, 1987
- Coleophora kasyi Toll, 1961
- Coleophora kautzi Rebel, 1933
- Coleophora kuehnella (Goeze, 1783)
- Coleophora laricella (Hübner, 1817)
- Coleophora lassella Staudinger, 1859
- Coleophora ledi Stainton, 1860
- Coleophora lessinica Baldizzone, 1980
- Coleophora limosipennella (Duponchel, 1843)
- Coleophora lineata Toll, 1960
- Coleophora lineolea (Haworth, 1828)
- Coleophora linosyridella Fuchs, 1880
- Coleophora linosyris Hering, 1937
- Coleophora lithargyrinella Zeller, 1849
- Coleophora lixella Zeller, 1849
- Coleophora longicornella Constant, 1893
- Coleophora luciennella Nel, 1992
- Coleophora lusciniaepennella (Treitschke, 1833)
- Coleophora luteolella Staudinger, 1880
- Coleophora lutipennella (Zeller, 1838)
- Coleophora macrobiella Constant, 1885
- Coleophora maritimarum Baldizzone, 2004
- Coleophora maritimella Newman, 1863
- Coleophora mausolella Chretien, 1908
- Coleophora mayrella (Hübner, 1813)
- Coleophora medelichensis Krone, 1908
- Coleophora mediterranea Baldizzone, 1990
- Coleophora meridionella Rebel, 1912
- Coleophora millefolii Zeller, 1849
- Coleophora milvipennis Zeller, 1839
- Coleophora motacillella Zeller, 1849
- Coleophora murciana Toll, 1960
- Coleophora musculella Muhlig, 1864
- Coleophora narbonensis Baldizzone, 1990
- Coleophora neli Baldizzone, 2000
- Coleophora nepetellae Baldizzone & Nel, 2014
- Coleophora nevadella Baldizzone, 1985
- Coleophora niveiciliella Hofmann, 1877
- Coleophora niveicostella Zeller, 1839
- Coleophora niveistrigella Wocke, 1877
- Coleophora nubivagella Zeller, 1849
- Coleophora nutantella Muhlig & Frey, 1857
- Coleophora obscenella Herrich-Schaffer, 1855
- Coleophora obtectella Zeller, 1849
- Coleophora occitana Baldizzone, 1989
- Coleophora ochrea (Haworth, 1828)
- Coleophora ochripennella Zeller, 1849
- Coleophora onobrychiella Zeller, 1849
- Coleophora ononidella Milliere, 1879
- Coleophora onopordiella Zeller, 1849
- Coleophora orbitella Zeller, 1849
- Coleophora oriolella Zeller, 1849
- Coleophora ornatipennella (Hübner, 1796)
- Coleophora otidipennella (Hübner, 1817)
- Coleophora pappiferella Hofmann, 1869
- Coleophora paramayrella Nel, 1993
- Coleophora paripennella Zeller, 1839
- Coleophora partitella Zeller, 1849
- Coleophora peisoniella Kasy, 1965
- Coleophora pennella (Denis & Schiffermuller, 1775)
- Coleophora peribenanderi Toll, 1943
- Coleophora picardella Suire, 1934
- Coleophora potentillae Elisha, 1885
- Coleophora praecursella Zeller, 1847
- Coleophora pratella Zeller, 1871
- Coleophora preisseckeri Toll, 1942
- Coleophora prunifoliae Doets, 1944
- Coleophora pseudoditella Baldizzone & Patzak, 1983
- Coleophora pseudorepentis Toll, 1960
- Coleophora pseudosquamosella Baldizzone & Nel, 2003
- Coleophora ptarmicia Walsingham, 1910
- Coleophora pulmonariella Ragonot, 1874
- Coleophora punctulatella Zeller, 1849
- Coleophora pyrenaica Baldizzone, 1980
- Coleophora pyrrhulipennella Zeller, 1839
- Coleophora quadristraminella Toll, 1961
- Coleophora ramosella Zeller, 1849
- Coleophora ravillella Toll, 1961
- Coleophora rectilineella Fischer v. Röslerstamm, 1843
- Coleophora repentis Klimesch, 1947
- Coleophora retrodentella Baldizzone & Nel, 2004
- Coleophora ribasella Baldizzone, 1982
- Coleophora riffelensis Rebel, 1913
- Coleophora rudella Toll, 1944
- Coleophora salicorniae Heinemann & Wocke, 1877
- Coleophora salinella Stainton, 1859
- Coleophora santolinella Constant, 1890
- Coleophora saponariella Heeger, 1848
- Coleophora sardocorsa Baldizzone, 1983
- Coleophora sattleri Baldizzone, 1995
- Coleophora saturatella Stainton, 1850
- Coleophora saxicolella (Duponchel, 1843)
- Coleophora scabrida Toll, 1959
- Coleophora semicinerea Staudinger, 1859
- Coleophora sergiella Falkovitsh, 1979
- Coleophora serinipennella Christoph, 1872
- Coleophora serpylletorum Hering, 1889
- Coleophora serratella (Linnaeus, 1761)
- Coleophora serratulella Herrich-Schaffer, 1855
- Coleophora settarii Wocke, 1877
- Coleophora siccifolia Stainton, 1856
- Coleophora silenella Herrich-Schaffer, 1855
- Coleophora sisteronica Toll, 1961
- Coleophora sodae Baldizzone & Nel, 1993
- Coleophora solenella Staudinger, 1859
- Coleophora solitariella Zeller, 1849
- Coleophora spinella (Schrank, 1802)
- Coleophora spumosella Staudinger, 1859
- Coleophora squamella Constant, 1885
- Coleophora squamosella Stainton, 1856
- Coleophora staehelinella Walsingham, 1891
- Coleophora sternipennella (Zetterstedt, 1839)
- Coleophora striatipennella Nylander in Tengstrom, 1848
- Coleophora strigosella Toll, 1960
- Coleophora striolatella Zeller, 1849
- Coleophora struella Staudinger, 1859
- Coleophora succursella Herrich-Schaffer, 1855
- Coleophora supinella Ortner, 1949
- Coleophora sylvaticella Wood, 1892
- Coleophora taeniipennella Herrich-Schaffer, 1855
- Coleophora tamesis Waters, 1929
- Coleophora tanaceti Muhlig, 1865
- Coleophora taygeti Baldizzone, 1983
- Coleophora telonica Nel, 1991
- Coleophora therinella Tengstrom, 1848
- Coleophora thurneri Glaser, 1969
- Coleophora tolli Klimesch, 1951
- Coleophora treskaensis Toll & Amsel, 1967
- Coleophora tricolor Walsingham, 1889
- Coleophora trifariella Zeller, 1849
- Coleophora trifolii (Curtis, 1832)
- Coleophora trigeminella Fuchs, 1881
- Coleophora trochilella (Duponchel, 1843)
- Coleophora tyrrhaenica Amsel, 1951
- Coleophora uliginosella Glitz, 1872
- Coleophora unipunctella Zeller, 1849
- Coleophora uralensis Toll, 1961
- Coleophora vacciniella Herrich-Schaffer, 1861
- Coleophora valesianella Zeller, 1849
- Coleophora varensis Baldizzone & Nel, 1993
- Coleophora variicornis Toll, 1952
- Coleophora versurella Zeller, 1849
- Coleophora vestalella Staudinger, 1859
- Coleophora vestianella (Linnaeus, 1758)
- Coleophora vibicella (Hübner, 1813)
- Coleophora vibicigerella Zeller, 1839
- Coleophora vicinella Zeller, 1849
- Coleophora violacea (Strom, 1783)
- Coleophora virgatella Zeller, 1849
- Coleophora virgaureae Stainton, 1857
- Coleophora vitisella Gregson, 1856
- Coleophora vulnerariae Zeller, 1839
- Coleophora vulpecula Zeller, 1849
- Coleophora wockeella Zeller, 1849
- Coleophora zelleriella Heinemann, 1854
- Coleophora zernyi Toll, 1944
- Goniodoma auroguttella (Fischer v. Röslerstamm, 1841)
- Goniodoma limoniella (Stainton, 1884)
- Goniodoma millierella Ragonot, 1882
- Metriotes jaeckhi Baldizzone, 1985
- Metriotes lutarea (Haworth, 1828)

== Family Cosmopterigidae ==
- Alloclita recisella Staudinger, 1859
- Ascalenia vanella (Frey, 1860)
- Coccidiphila danilevskyi Sinev, 1997
- Coccidiphila gerasimovi Danilevsky, 1950
- Coccidiphila ledereriella (Zeller, 1850)
- Cosmopterix crassicervicella Chretien, 1896
- Cosmopterix lienigiella Zeller, 1846
- Cosmopterix orichalcea Stainton, 1861
- Cosmopterix pararufella Riedl, 1976
- Cosmopterix pulchrimella Chambers, 1875
- Cosmopterix schmidiella Frey, 1856
- Cosmopterix scribaiella Zeller, 1850
- Cosmopterix zieglerella (Hübner, 1810)
- Eteobalea albiapicella (Duponchel, 1843)
- Eteobalea alypella (Klimesch, 1946)
- Eteobalea anonymella (Riedl, 1965)
- Eteobalea beata (Walsingham, 1907)
- Eteobalea dohrnii (Zeller, 1847)
- Eteobalea intermediella (Riedl, 1966)
- Eteobalea isabellella (O. G. Costa, 1836)
- Eteobalea serratella (Treitschke, 1833)
- Eteobalea sumptuosella (Lederer, 1855)
- Eteobalea tririvella (Staudinger, 1870)
- Gibeauxiella bellaqueifontis (Gibeaux, 1986)
- Gibeauxiella reliqua (Gibeaux, 1986)
- Gisilia lerautella Gibeaux, 1986
- Isidiella divitella (Constant, 1885)
- Isidiella nickerlii (Nickerl, 1864)
- Limnaecia phragmitella Stainton, 1851
- Pancalia leuwenhoekella (Linnaeus, 1761)
- Pancalia nodosella (Bruand, 1851)
- Pancalia schwarzella (Fabricius, 1798)
- Pyroderces argyrogrammos (Zeller, 1847)
- Sorhagenia janiszewskae Riedl, 1962
- Sorhagenia lophyrella (Douglas, 1846)
- Sorhagenia rhamniella (Zeller, 1839)
- Stagmatophora heydeniella (Fischer von Röslerstamm, 1838)
- Vulcaniella extremella (Wocke, 1871)
- Vulcaniella fiordalisa (Petry, 1904)
- Vulcaniella grabowiella (Staudinger, 1859)
- Vulcaniella pomposella (Zeller, 1839)
- Vulcaniella rosmarinella (Walsingham, 1891)

== Family Cossidae ==
- Acossus terebra (Denis & Schiffermuller, 1775)
- Cossus cossus (Linnaeus, 1758)
- Dyspessa ulula (Borkhausen, 1790)
- Parahypopta caestrum (Hübner, 1808)
- Parahypopta radoti (Homberg, 1911)
- Phragmataecia castaneae (Hübner, 1790)
- Stygia australis Latreille, 1804
- Zeuzera pyrina (Linnaeus, 1761)

== Family Crambidae ==
- Acentria ephemerella (Denis & Schiffermuller, 1775)
- Achyra nudalis (Hübner, 1796)
- Agriphila argentistrigellus (Ragonot, 1888)
- Agriphila brioniellus (Zerny, 1914)
- Agriphila deliella (Hübner, 1813)
- Agriphila geniculea (Haworth, 1811)
- Agriphila inquinatella (Denis & Schiffermuller, 1775)
- Agriphila latistria (Haworth, 1811)
- Agriphila poliellus (Treitschke, 1832)
- Agriphila selasella (Hübner, 1813)
- Agriphila straminella (Denis & Schiffermuller, 1775)
- Agriphila tersellus (Lederer, 1855)
- Agriphila tolli (Bleszynski, 1952)
- Agriphila trabeatellus (Herrich-Schaffer, 1848)
- Agriphila tristella (Denis & Schiffermuller, 1775)
- Agrotera nemoralis (Scopoli, 1763)
- Anania coronata (Hufnagel, 1767)
- Anania crocealis (Hübner, 1796)
- Anania funebris (Strom, 1768)
- Anania fuscalis (Denis & Schiffermuller, 1775)
- Anania hortulata (Linnaeus, 1758)
- Anania lancealis (Denis & Schiffermuller, 1775)
- Anania luctualis (Hübner, 1793)
- Anania oberthuri (Turati, 1913)
- Anania perlucidalis (Hübner, 1809)
- Anania stachydalis (Germar, 1821)
- Anania terrealis (Treitschke, 1829)
- Anania testacealis (Zeller, 1847)
- Anania verbascalis (Denis & Schiffermuller, 1775)
- Anarpia incertalis (Duponchel, 1832)
- Ancylolomia disparalis Hübner, 1825
- Ancylolomia palpella (Denis & Schiffermuller, 1775)
- Ancylolomia tentaculella (Hübner, 1796)
- Angustalius malacellus (Duponchel, 1836)
- Antigastra catalaunalis (Duponchel, 1833)
- Aporodes floralis (Hübner, 1809)
- Arnia nervosalis Guenee, 1849
- Atralata albofascialis (Treitschke, 1829)
- Calamotropha aureliellus (Fischer v. Röslerstamm, 1841)
- Calamotropha paludella (Hübner, 1824)
- Cataclysta lemnata (Linnaeus, 1758)
- Catharia pyrenaealis (Duponchel, 1843)
- Catoptria acutangulellus (Herrich-Schaffer, 1847)
- Catoptria bolivari (Agenjo, 1947)
- Catoptria combinella (Denis & Schiffermuller, 1775)
- Catoptria conchella (Denis & Schiffermuller, 1775)
- Catoptria corsicellus (Duponchel, 1836)
- Catoptria digitellus (Herrich-Schaffer, 1849)
- Catoptria europaeica Bleszynski, 1965
- Catoptria falsella (Denis & Schiffermuller, 1775)
- Catoptria fulgidella (Hübner, 1813)
- Catoptria furcatellus (Zetterstedt, 1839)
- Catoptria luctiferella (Hübner, 1813)
- Catoptria lythargyrella (Hübner, 1796)
- Catoptria margaritella (Denis & Schiffermuller, 1775)
- Catoptria myella (Hübner, 1796)
- Catoptria mytilella (Hübner, 1805)
- Catoptria permutatellus (Herrich-Schaffer, 1848)
- Catoptria petrificella (Hübner, 1796)
- Catoptria pinella (Linnaeus, 1758)
- Catoptria pyramidellus (Treitschke, 1832)
- Catoptria radiella (Hübner, 1813)
- Catoptria speculalis Hübner, 1825
- Catoptria staudingeri (Zeller, 1863)
- Catoptria verellus (Zincken, 1817)
- Catoptria zermattensis (Frey, 1870)
- Chilo luteellus (Motschulsky, 1866)
- Chilo phragmitella (Hübner, 1805)
- Chilo pulverosellus Ragonot, 1895
- Chilo suppressalis (Walker, 1863)
- Cholius luteolaris (Scopoli, 1772)
- Chrysocrambus craterella (Scopoli, 1763)
- Chrysocrambus linetella (Fabricius, 1781)
- Chrysoteuchia culmella (Linnaeus, 1758)
- Cleptotypodes ledereri (Staudinger, 1870)
- Crambus alienellus Germar & Kaulfuss, 1817
- Crambus cyrnellus Schawerda, 1926
- Crambus ericella (Hübner, 1813)
- Crambus hamella (Thunberg, 1788)
- Crambus lathoniellus (Zincken, 1817)
- Crambus palustrellus Ragonot, 1876
- Crambus pascuella (Linnaeus, 1758)
- Crambus perlella (Scopoli, 1763)
- Crambus pratella (Linnaeus, 1758)
- Crambus silvella (Hübner, 1813)
- Crambus uliginosellus Zeller, 1850
- Cynaeda dentalis (Denis & Schiffermuller, 1775)
- Cynaeda gigantea (Wocke, 1871)
- Diasemia reticularis (Linnaeus, 1761)
- Diasemiopsis ramburialis (Duponchel, 1834)
- Diplopseustis perieresalis (Walker, 1859)
- Dolicharthria aetnaealis (Duponchel, 1833)
- Dolicharthria bruguieralis (Duponchel, 1833)
- Dolicharthria punctalis (Denis & Schiffermuller, 1775)
- Dolicharthria stigmosalis (Herrich-Schaffer, 1848)
- Donacaula forficella (Thunberg, 1794)
- Donacaula mucronella (Denis & Schiffermuller, 1775)
- Duponchelia fovealis Zeller, 1847
- Ecpyrrhorrhoe diffusalis (Guenee, 1854)
- Ecpyrrhorrhoe rubiginalis (Hübner, 1796)
- Elophila bourgognei Leraut, 2001
- Elophila nymphaeata (Linnaeus, 1758)
- Elophila rivulalis (Duponchel, 1834)
- Emprepes pudicalis (Duponchel, 1832)
- Ephelis cruentalis (Geyer, 1832)
- Euchromius anapiellus (Zeller, 1847)
- Euchromius bella (Hübner, 1796)
- Euchromius cambridgei (Zeller, 1867)
- Euchromius gozmanyi Bleszynski, 1961
- Euchromius gratiosella (Caradja, 1910)
- Euchromius mouchai Bleszynski, 1961
- Euchromius ocellea (Haworth, 1811)
- Euchromius ramburiellus (Duponchel, 1836)
- Euchromius superbellus (Zeller, 1849)
- Euchromius vinculellus (Zeller, 1847)
- Eudonia angustea (Curtis, 1827)
- Eudonia delunella (Stainton, 1849)
- Eudonia lacustrata (Panzer, 1804)
- Eudonia liebmanni (Petry, 1904)
- Eudonia lineola (Curtis, 1827)
- Eudonia mercurella (Linnaeus, 1758)
- Eudonia murana (Curtis, 1827)
- Eudonia pallida (Curtis, 1827)
- Eudonia petrophila (Standfuss, 1848)
- Eudonia phaeoleuca (Zeller, 1846)
- Eudonia senecaensis Huemer & Leraut, 1993
- Eudonia sudetica (Zeller, 1839)
- Eudonia truncicolella (Stainton, 1849)
- Eudonia vallesialis (Duponchel, 1832)
- Eurrhypis guttulalis (Herrich-Schaffer, 1848)
- Eurrhypis pollinalis (Denis & Schiffermuller, 1775)
- Evergestis aenealis (Denis & Schiffermuller, 1775)
- Evergestis dumerlei Leraut, 2003
- Evergestis extimalis (Scopoli, 1763)
- Evergestis forficalis (Linnaeus, 1758)
- Evergestis frumentalis (Linnaeus, 1761)
- Evergestis isatidalis (Duponchel, 1833)
- Evergestis limbata (Linnaeus, 1767)
- Evergestis marionalis Leraut, 2003
- Evergestis marocana (D. Lucas, 1856)
- Evergestis mundalis (Guenee, 1854)
- Evergestis pallidata (Hufnagel, 1767)
- Evergestis politalis (Denis & Schiffermuller, 1775)
- Evergestis segetalis (Herrich-Schaffer, 1851)
- Evergestis sophialis (Fabricius, 1787)
- Friedlanderia cicatricella (Hübner, 1824)
- Gesneria centuriella (Denis & Schiffermuller, 1775)
- Heliothela wulfeniana (Scopoli, 1763)
- Hellula undalis (Fabricius, 1781)
- Hodebertia testalis (Fabricius, 1794)
- Hydriris ornatalis (Duponchel, 1832)
- Hyperlais nemausalis (Duponchel, 1834)
- Hyperlais rosseti Varenne, 2009
- Hyperlais siccalis Guenee, 1854
- Krombia venturalis Luquet & Minet, 1982
- Loxostege aeruginalis (Hübner, 1796)
- Loxostege comptalis (Freyer, 1848)
- Loxostege fascialis (Hübner, 1796)
- Loxostege manualis (Geyer, 1832)
- Loxostege scutalis (Hübner, 1813)
- Loxostege sticticalis (Linnaeus, 1761)
- Loxostege tesselalis (Guenee, 1854)
- Loxostege turbidalis (Treitschke, 1829)
- Loxostege virescalis (Guenee, 1854)
- Mecyna asinalis (Hübner, 1819)
- Mecyna auralis (Peyerimhoff, 1872)
- Mecyna flavalis (Denis & Schiffermuller, 1775)
- Mecyna lutealis (Duponchel, 1833)
- Mecyna marcidalis (Fuchs, 1879)
- Mecyna trinalis (Denis & Schiffermuller, 1775)
- Metacrambus carectellus (Zeller, 1847)
- Metacrambus pallidellus (Duponchel, 1836)
- Metasia carnealis (Treitschke, 1829)
- Metasia corsicalis (Duponchel, 1833)
- Metasia cuencalis Ragonot, 1894
- Metasia cyrnealis Schawerda, 1926
- Metasia hymenalis Guenee, 1854
- Metasia ibericalis Ragonot, 1894
- Metasia olbienalis Guenee, 1854
- Metasia ophialis (Treitschke, 1829)
- Metasia suppandalis (Hübner, 1823)
- Metaxmeste phrygialis (Hübner, 1796)
- Metaxmeste schrankiana (Hochenwarth, 1785)
- Nascia cilialis (Hübner, 1796)
- Nomophila noctuella (Denis & Schiffermuller, 1775)
- Nymphula nitidulata (Hufnagel, 1767)
- Orenaia alpestralis (Fabricius, 1787)
- Orenaia andereggialis (Herrich-Schaffer, 1851)
- Orenaia helveticalis (Herrich-Schaffer, 1851)
- Orenaia lugubralis (Lederer, 1857)
- Orenaia ventosalis Chretien, 1911
- Ostrinia nubilalis (Hübner, 1796)
- Palepicorsia ustrinalis (Christoph, 1877)
- Palpita vitrealis (Rossi, 1794)
- Paracorsia repandalis (Denis & Schiffermuller, 1775)
- Parapoynx stratiotata (Linnaeus, 1758)
- Paratalanta hyalinalis (Hübner, 1796)
- Paratalanta pandalis (Hübner, 1825)
- Pediasia aridella (Thunberg, 1788)
- Pediasia contaminella (Hübner, 1796)
- Pediasia fascelinella (Hübner, 1813)
- Pediasia luteella (Denis & Schiffermuller, 1775)
- Pediasia pedriolellus (Duponchel, 1836)
- Pediasia subflavellus (Duponchel, 1836)
- Platytes alpinella (Hübner, 1813)
- Platytes cerussella (Denis & Schiffermuller, 1775)
- Pleuroptya balteata (Fabricius, 1798)
- Pleuroptya crocealis (Duponchel, 1834)
- Pleuroptya ruralis (Scopoli, 1763)
- Psammotis pulveralis (Hübner, 1796)
- Pyrausta acontialis (Staudinger, 1859)
- Pyrausta aerealis (Hübner, 1793)
- Pyrausta aurata (Scopoli, 1763)
- Pyrausta castalis Treitschke, 1829
- Pyrausta cingulata (Linnaeus, 1758)
- Pyrausta coracinalis Leraut, 1982
- Pyrausta despicata (Scopoli, 1763)
- Pyrausta falcatalis Guenee, 1854
- Pyrausta nigrata (Scopoli, 1763)
- Pyrausta obfuscata (Scopoli, 1763)
- Pyrausta ostrinalis (Hübner, 1796)
- Pyrausta porphyralis (Denis & Schiffermuller, 1775)
- Pyrausta purpuralis (Linnaeus, 1758)
- Pyrausta sanguinalis (Linnaeus, 1767)
- Pyrausta virginalis Duponchel, 1832
- Schoenobius gigantella (Denis & Schiffermuller, 1775)
- Scirpophaga praelata (Scopoli, 1763)
- Sclerocona acutella (Eversmann, 1842)
- Scoparia ambigualis (Treitschke, 1829)
- Scoparia ancipitella (La Harpe, 1855)
- Scoparia basistrigalis Knaggs, 1866
- Scoparia conicella (La Harpe, 1863)
- Scoparia gallica Peyerimhoff, 1873
- Scoparia ingratella (Zeller, 1846)
- Scoparia manifestella (Herrich-Schaffer, 1848)
- Scoparia pyralella (Denis & Schiffermuller, 1775)
- Scoparia staudingeralis (Mabille, 1869)
- Scoparia subfusca Haworth, 1811
- Sitochroa palealis (Denis & Schiffermuller, 1775)
- Sitochroa verticalis (Linnaeus, 1758)
- Spoladea recurvalis (Fabricius, 1775)
- Tegostoma comparalis (Hübner, 1796)
- Thisanotia chrysonuchella (Scopoli, 1763)
- Thopeutis galleriellus (Ragonot, 1892)
- Titanio tarraconensis Leraut & Luquet, 1982
- Udea accolalis (Zeller, 1867)
- Udea alpinalis (Denis & Schiffermuller, 1775)
- Udea austriacalis (Herrich-Schaffer, 1851)
- Udea bipunctalis (Herrich-Schaffer, 1851)
- Udea bourgognealis Leraut, 1996
- Udea costalis (Eversmann, 1852)
- Udea cyanalis (La Harpe, 1855)
- Udea decrepitalis (Herrich-Schaffer, 1848)
- Udea elutalis (Denis & Schiffermuller, 1775)
- Udea ferrugalis (Hübner, 1796)
- Udea fimbriatralis (Duponchel, 1834)
- Udea fulvalis (Hübner, 1809)
- Udea hamalis (Thunberg, 1788)
- Udea inquinatalis (Lienig & Zeller, 1846)
- Udea institalis (Hübner, 1819)
- Udea lerautalis Tautel, 2014
- Udea lutealis (Hübner, 1809)
- Udea murinalis (Fischer v. Röslerstamm, 1842)
- Udea nebulalis (Hübner, 1796)
- Udea numeralis (Hübner, 1796)
- Udea olivalis (Denis & Schiffermuller, 1775)
- Udea prunalis (Denis & Schiffermuller, 1775)
- Udea rhododendronalis (Duponchel, 1834)
- Udea rubigalis (Guenee, 1854)
- Udea uliginosalis (Stephens, 1834)
- Uresiphita gilvata (Fabricius, 1794)
- Xanthocrambus caducellus (Muller-Rutz, 1909)
- Xanthocrambus delicatellus (Zeller, 1863)
- Xanthocrambus lucellus (Herrich-Schaffer, 1848)
- Xanthocrambus saxonellus (Zincken, 1821)
