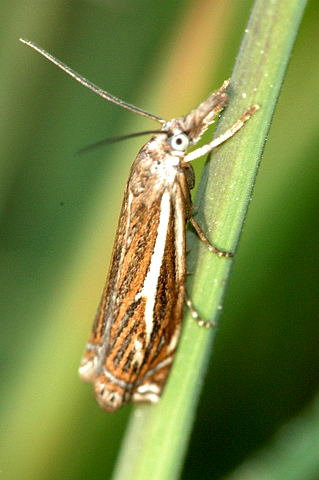

Scientific classification
- Kingdom: Animalia
- Phylum: Arthropoda
- Clade: Pancrustacea
- Class: Insecta
- Order: Lepidoptera
- Family: Crambidae
- Genus: Crambus
- Species: C. pratella

Binomial name
- Crambus pratella (Linnaeus, 1758)

Synonyms
- Phalaena (Tinea) pratella Linnaeus, 1758; Argyroteuchia saltalis Hübner, 1825; Crambus scoticus Westwood in Humphreys & Westwood, 1841; Crambus scotius Ganev, 1996; Crambus gelatellus Réal, 1988; Crambus pratellus ab. egregiellus Rebel, 1915; Crambus pratellus ab. obscurellus Mann, 1871; Crambus pratellus var. marpurgensis Strand, 1920; Argyroteuchia pratalis Hübner, 1825; Palparia pratea Haworth, 1811; Crambus pratorum Fabricius, 1798; Tinea dumetella Hübner, 1813; Crambus dumetellus ab. depunctellus Strand, 1902; Crambus dumetellus var. boreellus Caradja, 1910; Crambus dumetellus var. plumbatellus Osthelder, 1939

= Crambus pratella =

Species of moth

Crambus pratella is a species of moth of the family Crambidae. It is found in Europe and Asia Minor.

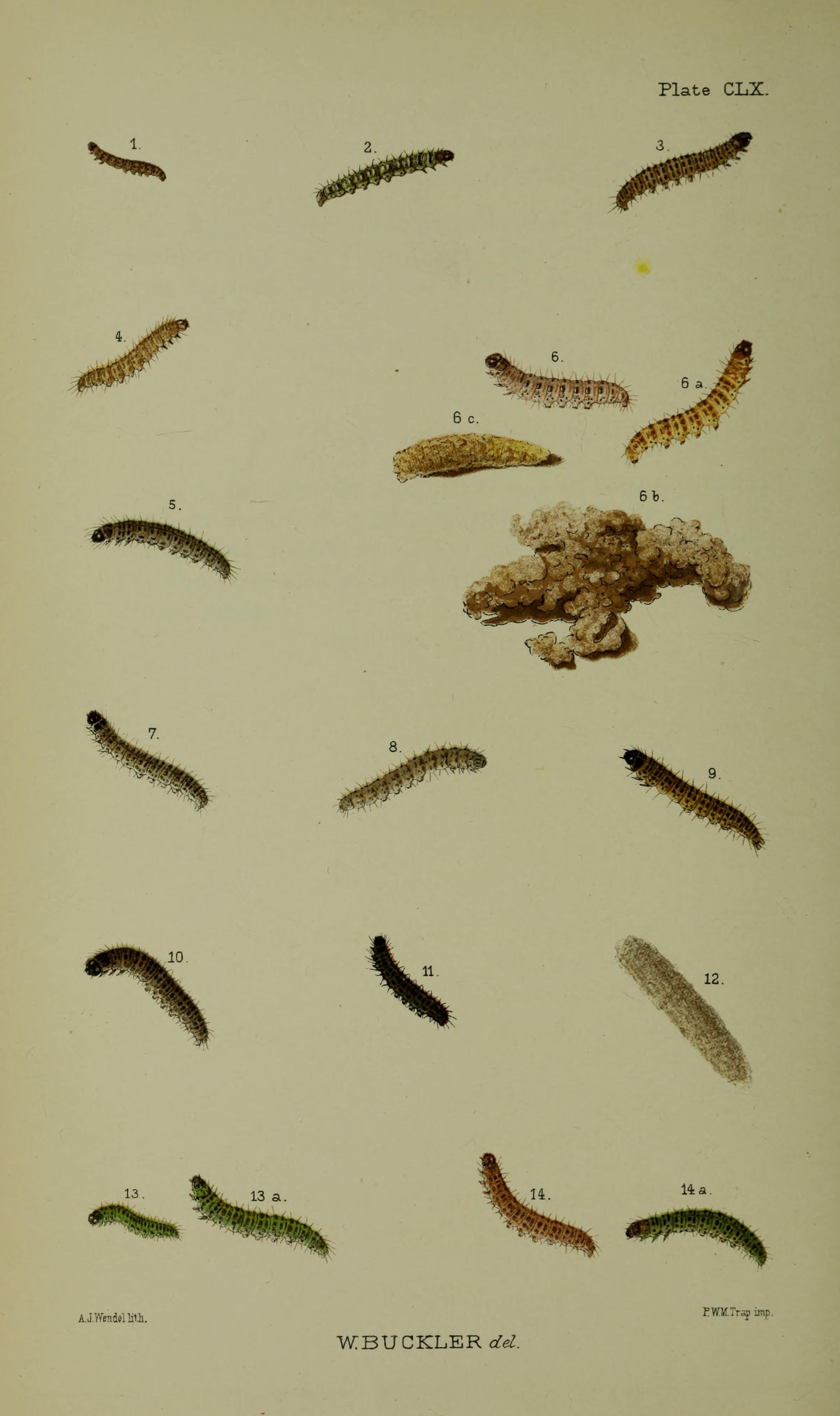
Fig. 3 larva after final moult

The wingspan is 22–25 mm. Forewings with apex somewhat produced; brown, sometimes ochreous-mixed, in male with grey, in female with whitish blackish-edged interneural streaks; a subcostal white streak on basal half; a white median streak, upper edge straight, lower edge projecting in middle, cut by sharply angulated dark brown median line; second line angulated, white, edged with dark brown, preceded by white costal mark; a white terminal streak, with several black dots; cilia metallic. Hindwings are rather dark grey [applies partly to Crambus pascuella but this is smaller and has a narrower longitudinal streak]. The larva is greenish-grey or brownish-grey; dots darker; head brown, darker-marked. See also Parsons et al.

The moth flies from May to August depending on the location.

The larvae feed on various grasses, especially Deschampsia species.
