= Krombia pulchella =

Scientific classification
- Kingdom: Animalia
- Phylum: Arthropoda
- Clade: Pancrustacea
- Class: Insecta
- Order: Lepidoptera
- Family: Crambidae
- Genus: Krombia
- Species: K. pulchella

Binomial name
- Krombia pulchella Amsel, 1949

Species of moth

Krombia pulchella is a moth in the family Crambidae. It was described by Hans Georg Amsel in 1949. It is found in Iran.

== Subspecies ==
- Krombia pulchella pulchella
- Krombia pulchella farsella Amsel, 1961
