= Krombia =

Scientific classification
- Domain: Eukaryota
- Kingdom: Animalia
- Phylum: Arthropoda
- Class: Insecta
- Order: Lepidoptera
- Family: Crambidae
- Subfamily: Cybalomiinae
- Genus: Krombia; Chrétien, 1911

Genus of moths

Krombia is a genus of moths of the family Crambidae.

== Species ==
- Krombia belutschistanalis Amsel, 1961
- Krombia djergiralis Chrétien, 1911
- Krombia harralis Chrétien, 1911
- Krombia minimella Amsel, 1961
- Krombia pulchella Amsel, 1949
- Krombia venturalis Luquet & Minet, 1982
- Krombia zarcinella D. Lucas, 1909
