= Krombia zarcinella =

Scientific classification
- Kingdom: Animalia
- Phylum: Arthropoda
- Clade: Pancrustacea
- Class: Insecta
- Order: Lepidoptera
- Family: Crambidae
- Genus: Krombia
- Species: K. zarcinella

Binomial name
- Krombia zarcinella (D. Lucas, 1909)

Synonyms
- Platytes zarcinella D. Lucas, 1909; Krombia zarcinellus D. Lucas, 1909

Species of moth

Krombia zarcinella is a moth in the family Crambidae. It is found in Tunisia.
