= Krombia harralis =

Scientific classification
- Kingdom: Animalia
- Phylum: Arthropoda
- Clade: Pancrustacea
- Class: Insecta
- Order: Lepidoptera
- Family: Crambidae
- Genus: Krombia
- Species: K. harralis

Binomial name
- Krombia harralis Chrétien, 1911

Species of moth

Krombia harralis is a moth in the family Crambidae. It is found in North Africa.
