= Krombia minimella =

Scientific classification
- Kingdom: Animalia
- Phylum: Arthropoda
- Clade: Pancrustacea
- Class: Insecta
- Order: Lepidoptera
- Family: Crambidae
- Genus: Krombia
- Species: K. minimella

Binomial name
- Krombia minimella Amsel, 1961

Species of moth

Krombia minimella is a moth in the family Crambidae. It was described by Hans Georg Amsel in 1961. It is found in Iran.
