= Coleophora punctulatella =

Scientific classification
- Kingdom: Animalia
- Phylum: Arthropoda
- Clade: Pancrustacea
- Class: Insecta
- Order: Lepidoptera
- Family: Coleophoridae
- Genus: Coleophora
- Species: C. punctulatella

Binomial name
- Coleophora punctulatella Zeller, 1849

Synonyms
- Coleophora camphorosmella Constant, 1885

Species of moth

Coleophora punctulatella is a moth of the family Coleophoridae. It is found in southern France, Spain and Hungary.

The larvae feed on Camphorosma monspeliaca. They create a small, dark brown, squat tubular silken case with a very oblique mouth angle. They feed on the fruits.
