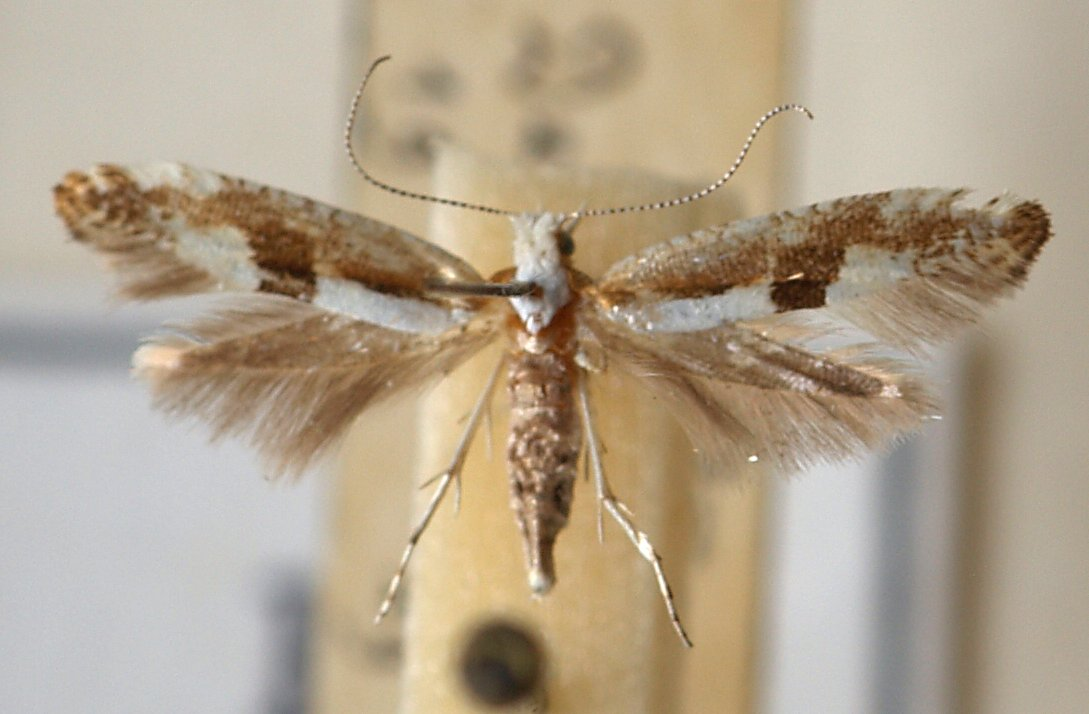

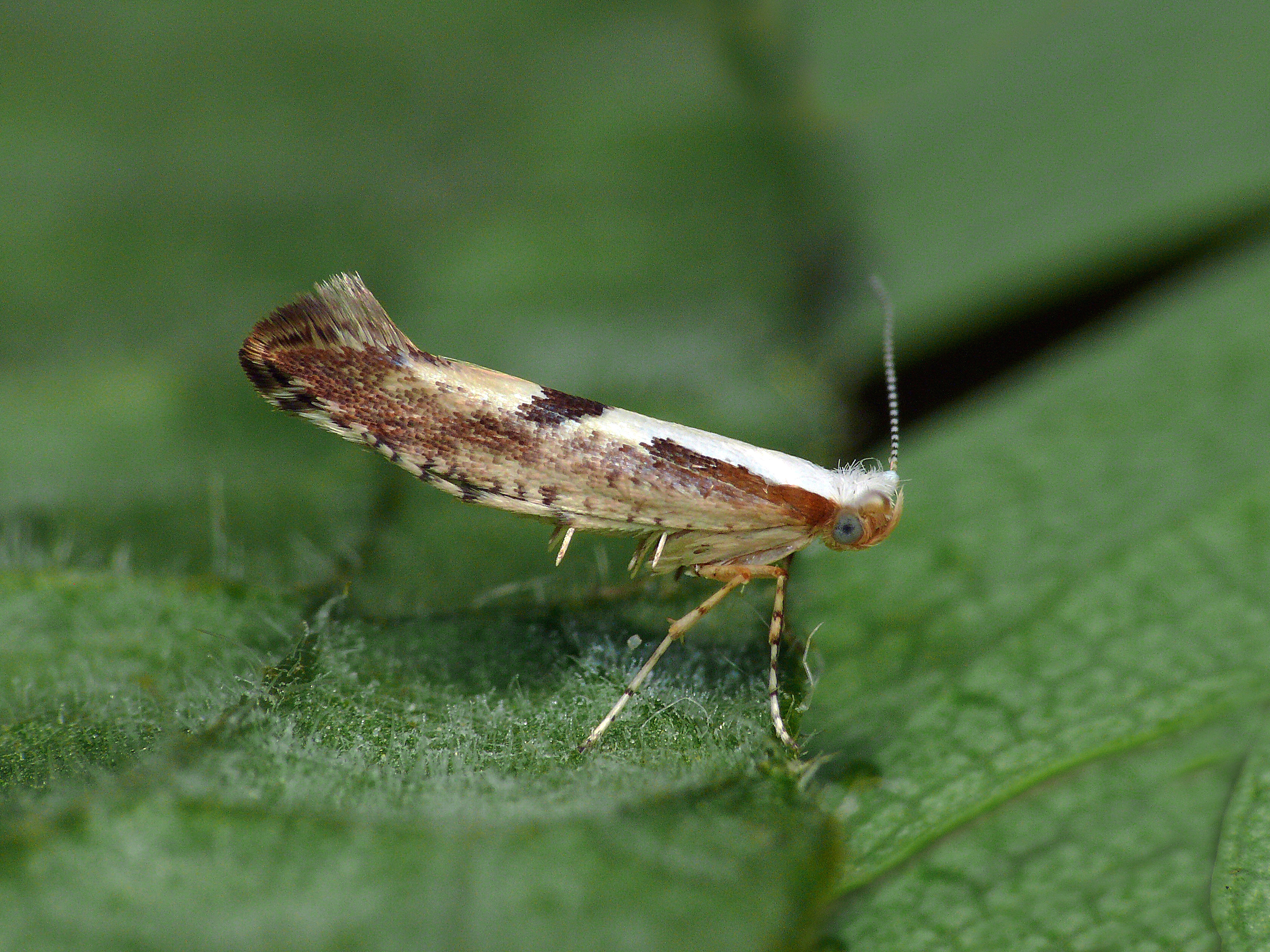
- Argyresthia bonnetella Malvern Hills, England

Scientific classification
- Kingdom: Animalia
- Phylum: Arthropoda
- Clade: Pancrustacea
- Class: Insecta
- Order: Lepidoptera
- Family: Argyresthiidae
- Genus: Argyresthia
- Species: A. bonnetella

Binomial name
- Argyresthia bonnetella (Linnaeus, 1758)

Synonyms
- Phalaena bonnetella Linnaeus, 1758; Argyresthia (Argyresthia) bonnetella; Phalaena tetrapodella Linnaeus, 1767; Tinea nitidella Fabricius, 1787; Erminea ossea Haworth, 1828; Argyresthia purpurascentella Stainton, 1849

= Argyresthia bonnetella =

Hawthorn Argent

Species of moth

Argyresthia bonnetella, commonly known as the hawthorn argent, is a moth of the family Yponomeutidae. It is found in Europe. The wingspan is 9–11 mm. The head is white. Forewings are shining ochreous-whitish, usually strigulated and sometimes discally suffused with ferruginous brown; a suffused ferruginous -brown median longitudinal streak from base to before middle; a curved dark ferruginous- brown fascia from middle of dorsum to 4/5 of costa, sometimes obsolete except on dorsum. Hindwings are grey. The larva is yellow-green; head and plate of 2 brown.

The moth flies from July to September..

The larvae feed on Crataegus.

== Notes ==
1. The flight season refers to Belgium and The Netherlands. This may vary in other parts of the range.
