= Coleophora sodae =

Scientific classification
- Kingdom: Animalia
- Phylum: Arthropoda
- Clade: Pancrustacea
- Class: Insecta
- Order: Lepidoptera
- Family: Coleophoridae
- Genus: Coleophora
- Species: C. sodae

Binomial name
- Coleophora sodae Baldizzone & Nel, 1993

Species of moth

Coleophora sodae is a moth of the family Coleophoridae. It is found in Spain, Portugal and France.

The larvae feed on Salsola soda. They feed on the generative organs of their host plant.
