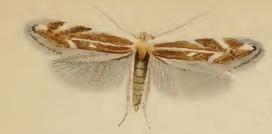

Scientific classification
- Kingdom: Animalia
- Phylum: Arthropoda
- Clade: Pancrustacea
- Class: Insecta
- Order: Lepidoptera
- Family: Bucculatricidae
- Genus: Bucculatrix
- Species: B. maritima

Binomial name
- Bucculatrix maritima Stainton, 1851

= Bucculatrix maritima =

Species of moth

Bucculatrix maritima is a species of moth of the family Bucculatricidae. It is found in most of Europe (except the Balkan Peninsula), Russia and Japan (the islands of Hokkaido and Honshu). It was first described in 1851 by Henry Tibbats Stainton.

The wingspan is 8–9 mm. The head is pale greyish-ochreous, centre sometimes fuscous. Forewings are light greyish-ochreous, more or less irrorated with fuscous; a short median streak from base, pairs of costal and dorsal undefined spots before middle and at 3/4 whitish, often very indistinct; plical and second discal stigmata minute, black. Hindwings are rather dark grey. The larva is pale greyish-green; dorsal line darker, head yellowish; segment 2 yellowish-grey, blackish- dotted.

Adults are on wing in June and again in August. There are two generations per year.

The larvae feed on sea aster (Aster tripolium). They mine the leaves of their host plant.

== Gallery ==
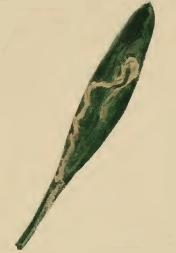
Mined leaf of Aster tripolium

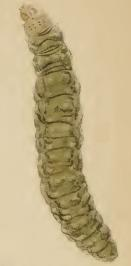
Larva
