= Coleophora hyssopi =

Scientific classification
- Kingdom: Animalia
- Phylum: Arthropoda
- Class: Insecta
- Order: Lepidoptera
- Family: Coleophoridae
- Genus: Coleophora
- Species: C. hyssopi

Binomial name
- Coleophora hyssopi Toll, 1961

Synonyms
- Coleophora melissella Toll, 1961

Species of moth

Coleophora hyssopi is a moth of the family Coleophoridae. It is found in southern France and Spain.

The larvae feed on Hyssopus officinalis. They create a case which can be found during the summer.
