= Coleophora telonica =

Scientific classification
- Kingdom: Animalia
- Phylum: Arthropoda
- Class: Insecta
- Order: Lepidoptera
- Family: Coleophoridae
- Genus: Coleophora
- Species: C. telonica

Binomial name
- Coleophora telonica Nel, 1991

Species of moth

Coleophora telonica is a moth of the family Coleophoridae. It is found in southern France.
