= Coleophora dubiella =

Scientific classification
- Kingdom: Animalia
- Phylum: Arthropoda
- Class: Insecta
- Order: Lepidoptera
- Family: Coleophoridae
- Genus: Coleophora
- Species: C. dubiella

Binomial name
- Coleophora dubiella Baker, 1888

Synonyms
- Coleophora eucera Toll, 1952; Coleophora leucostrigella Toll, 1960; Coleophora microeucera Toll, 1956; Coleophora reisseri Rebel, 1926; Coleophora assimilatella Turati, 1926

Species of moth

Coleophora dubiella is a moth of the family Coleophoridae. It is found in Algeria, Libya, Morocco, Tunisia, Spain, France, southern Russia and Turkey.

The wingspan is 19–20 mm.

The larvae feed on the leaves of Artemisia species, including Artemisia fragrans.
