= Coleophora eupepla =

Scientific classification
- Kingdom: Animalia
- Phylum: Arthropoda
- Clade: Pancrustacea
- Class: Insecta
- Order: Lepidoptera
- Family: Coleophoridae
- Genus: Coleophora
- Species: C. eupepla

Binomial name
- Coleophora eupepla Gozmany, 1954

Species of moth

Coleophora eupepla is a moth of the family Coleophoridae. It is found in Turkey, Russia, Hungary, North Macedonia, Greece, France and Spain.

The larvae possibly feed on Onobrychis viciifolia.
