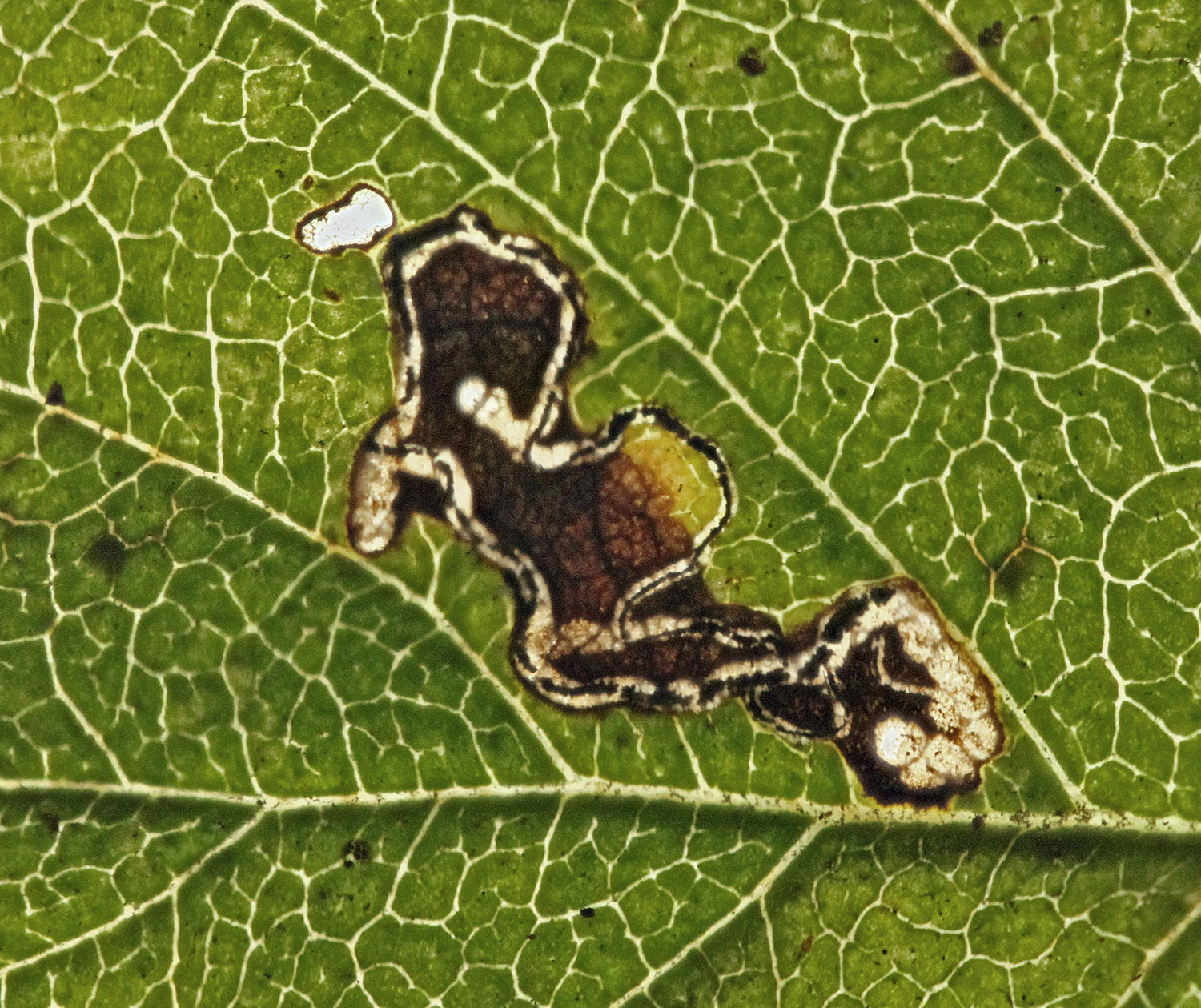
- Bucculatrix albedinella mine Wales

Scientific classification
- Kingdom: Animalia
- Phylum: Arthropoda
- Clade: Pancrustacea
- Class: Insecta
- Order: Lepidoptera
- Family: Bucculatricidae
- Genus: Bucculatrix
- Species: B. albedinella

Binomial name
- Bucculatrix albedinella (Zeller, 1839)

Synonyms
- Lyonetia albedinella Zeller, 1839; Elachista boyerella Duponchel, 1840; Bucculatrix boyerella

= Bucculatrix albedinella =

Species of moth

Bucculatrix albedinella is a moth species of the family Bucculatricidae and was first described in 1839 by Philipp Christoph Zeller. It is found in most of Europe (except Ireland and the Iberian Peninsula).

The wingspan is 8–9 millimetres (0.31–0.35 in).
