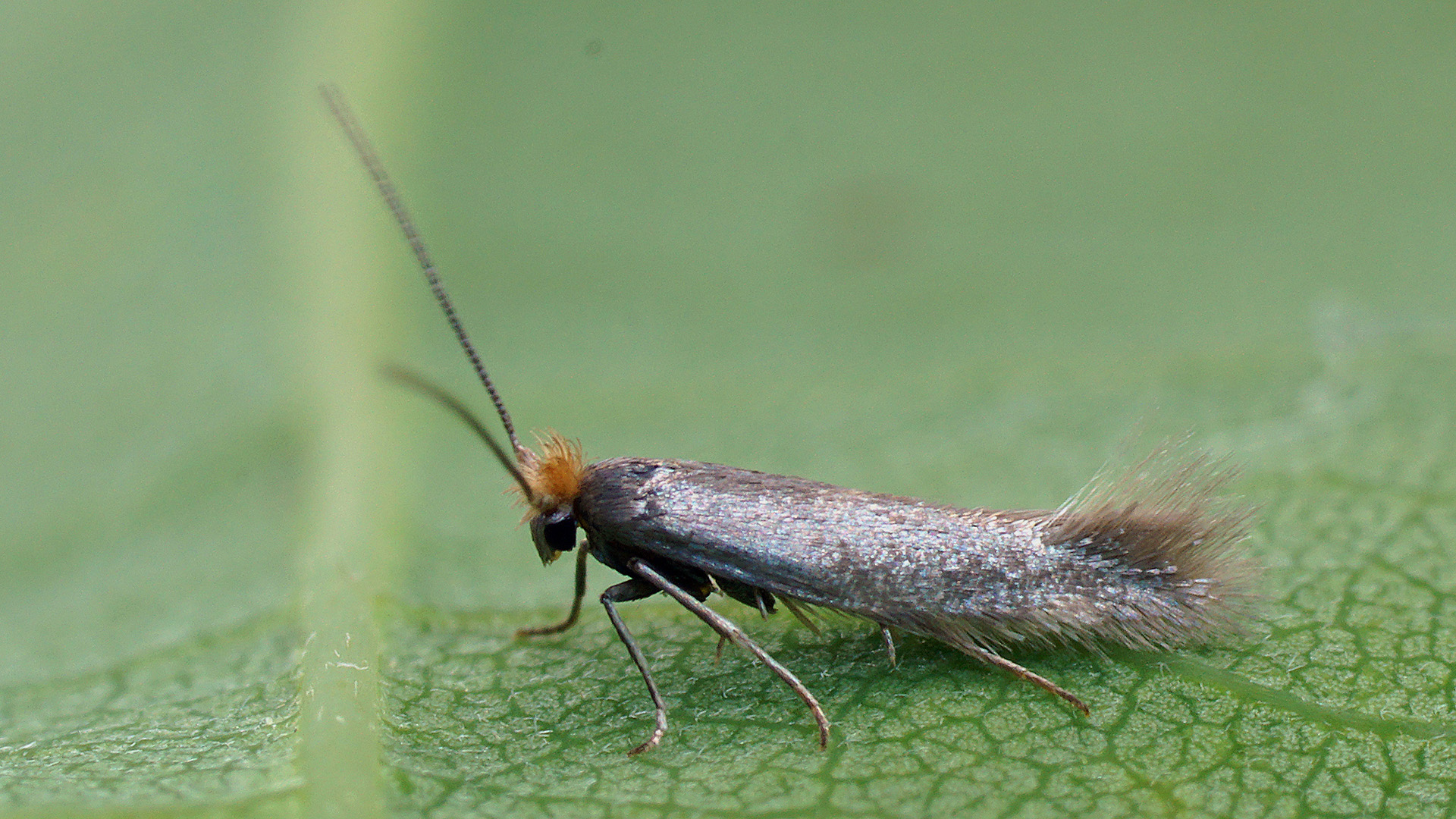

Scientific classification
- Kingdom: Animalia
- Phylum: Arthropoda
- Clade: Pancrustacea
- Class: Insecta
- Order: Lepidoptera
- Family: Bucculatricidae
- Genus: Bucculatrix
- Species: B. cristatella

Binomial name
- Bucculatrix cristatella (Zeller, 1839)

Synonyms
- Lyonetia cristatella Zeller, 1839; Bucculatrix jugicola Wocke, 1876; Lyonetia concolorella Tengström, 1848

= Bucculatrix cristatella =

Species of moth

Bucculatrix cristatella is a species of moth of the family Bucculatricidae. It is found in most of Europe (except the Iberian Peninsula and the Balkan Peninsula). It was described in 1839 by Philipp Christoph Zeller.

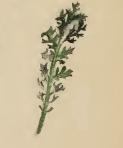
Gnawed yarrow leaf with the cocoon near its tip

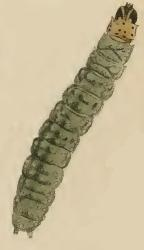
Larva

The wingspan is about 7 mm. The head is ochreous-yellowish to light yellowish -fuscous. Forewings are shining ochreous-grey. Hindwings grey. The larva is pale greenish; dorsal and subdorsal lines darker; dots whitish and the head pale brown. Plate of 2 yellowish, brown-dotted.

Adults are on wing from May to June and again from July to August. There are two generations per year.

The larvae feed on Achillea millefolium, Anthemis tinctoria, Chrysanthemum species and Leucanthemopsis alpina. They mine the leaves of their host plant. Last instar larvae feed freely on the leaf.
