= Coleophora macrobiella =

Scientific classification
- Kingdom: Animalia
- Phylum: Arthropoda
- Class: Insecta
- Order: Lepidoptera
- Family: Coleophoridae
- Genus: Coleophora
- Species: C. macrobiella

Binomial name
- Coleophora macrobiella Constant, 1885

Species of moth

Coleophora macrobiella is a moth of the family Coleophoridae. It is found in southern France and Spain.

The larvae feed on Camphorosma monspeliaca. They create a very slender, dark grey, tubular silken case of 15–16 mm. Larvae can be found from October to May.
