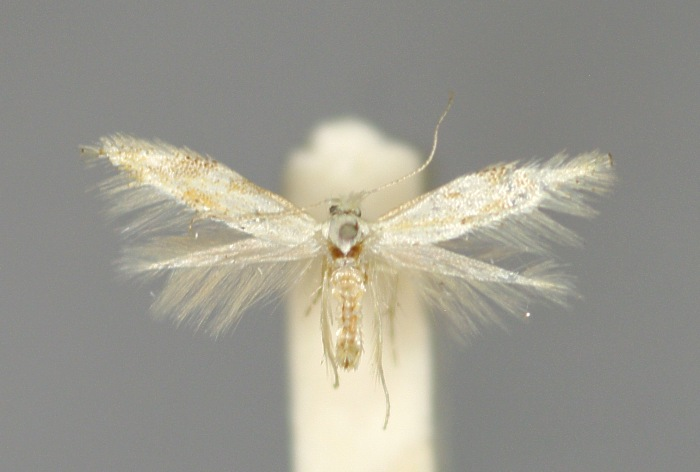

Scientific classification
- Kingdom: Animalia
- Phylum: Arthropoda
- Clade: Pancrustacea
- Class: Insecta
- Order: Lepidoptera
- Family: Bucculatricidae
- Genus: Bucculatrix
- Species: B. demaryella

Binomial name
- Bucculatrix demaryella (Duponchel, 1840)

Synonyms
- Elachista demaryella Duponchel, 1840; Bucculatrix castaneae Klimesch, 1950; Bucculatrix scoticella Herrich-Schäffer, 1855

= Bucculatrix demaryella =

Species of moth

Bucculatrix demaryella, or the birch bent-wing, is a moth of the family Bucculatricidae. The species was first described by Philogène Auguste Joseph Duponchel in 1840. It is found in most of Europe (except the Iberian Peninsula and parts of the Balkan Peninsula), Russia and Japan (Hokkaido, Honshu).

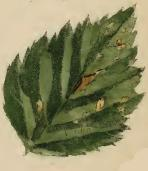
Mined and gnawed birch leaf

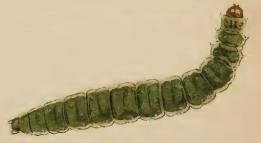
Larva

The wingspan is 8–9 millimetres (0.31–0.35 in). The head is whitish, mixed in middle with dark fuscous. Forewings are brownish-whitish, irrorated with dark fuscous; two pairs of oblique whitish costal and dorsal streaks before middle and at 3/4, intermediate space dark fuscous towards costa. Hindwings are grey. The larva is dull green, more whitish laterally, the spots white and the head brown.

Adults are on wing from May to early June in one generation per year.

The larvae of ssp. demaryella feed on Betula nana, Betula pendula, Betula pubescens and Corylus avellana, while the larvae of ssp. castaneae feed on Acer species and Castanea sativa. They mine the leaves of their host plant.

== Subspecies ==
- Bucculatrix demaryella demaryella
- Bucculatrix demaryella castaneae Klimesch, 1950 (Austria, Italy, Switzerland)
