= Coleophora strigosella =

Scientific classification
- Kingdom: Animalia
- Phylum: Arthropoda
- Class: Insecta
- Order: Lepidoptera
- Family: Coleophoridae
- Genus: Coleophora
- Species: C. strigosella

Binomial name
- Coleophora strigosella Toll, 1960

Species of moth

Coleophora strigosella is a moth of the family Coleophoridae. It is found in Portugal, Spain and France.

The larvae feed on the leaves of Quercus species.
