= Coleophora varensis =

Scientific classification
- Kingdom: Animalia
- Phylum: Arthropoda
- Clade: Pancrustacea
- Class: Insecta
- Order: Lepidoptera
- Family: Coleophoridae
- Genus: Coleophora
- Species: C. varensis

Binomial name
- Coleophora varensis Baldizzone & Nel, 1993

Species of moth

Coleophora varensis is a moth of the family Coleophoridae. It is found in France and Spain.

The larvae feed on Carex chaetophylla.
