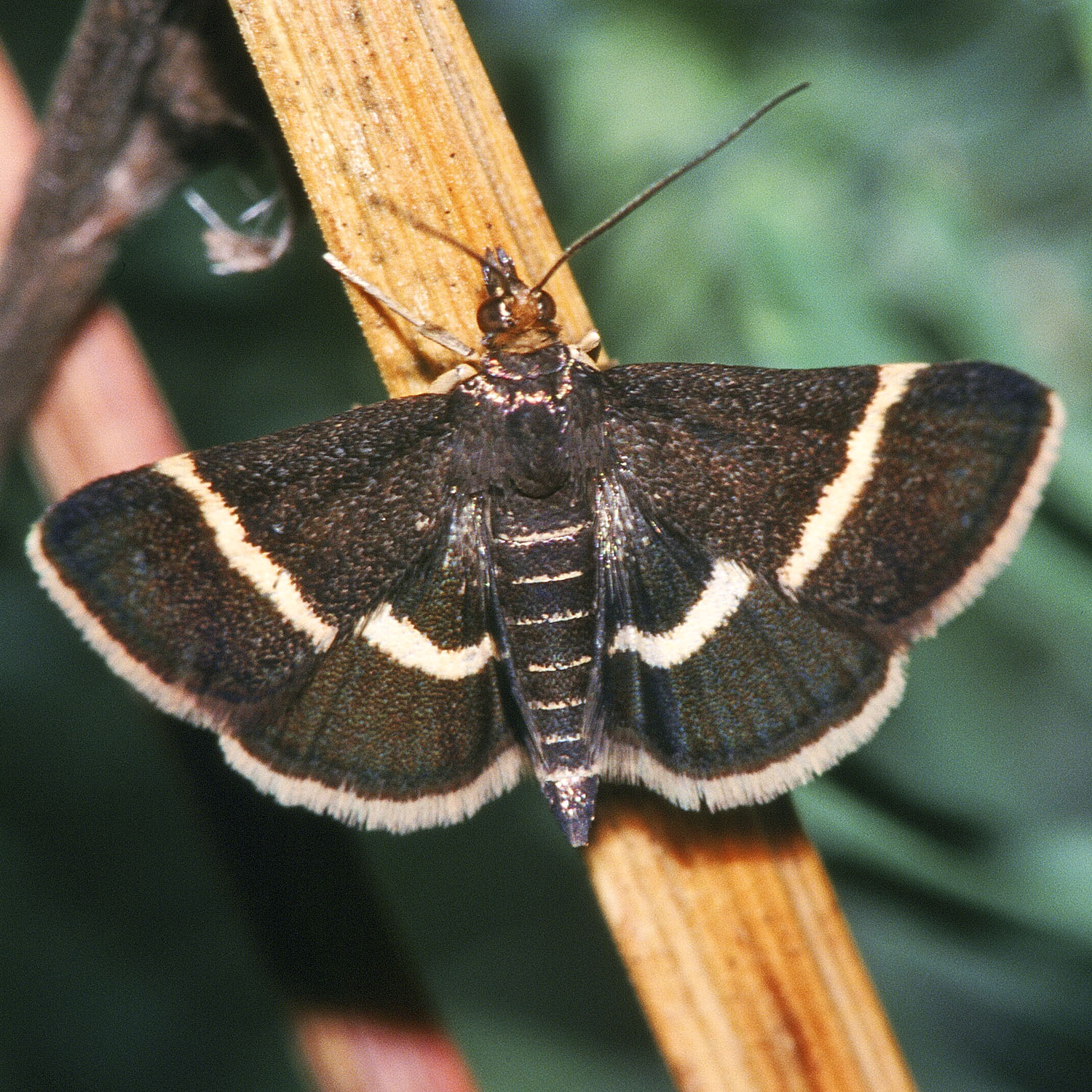

Scientific classification
- Kingdom: Animalia
- Phylum: Arthropoda
- Class: Insecta
- Order: Lepidoptera
- Family: Crambidae
- Genus: Pyrausta
- Species: P. cingulata

Binomial name
- Pyrausta cingulata (Linnaeus, 1758)

Synonyms
- Phalaena (Geometra) cingulata Linnaeus, 1758; Botys vittalis La Harpe, 1864; Botys cingulalis (Denis & Schiffermüller, 1775); Botys eremitica Fourcroy, 1785; Phalaena aethiopata Scopoli, 1763; Phalaena nigralis Fabricius, 1781; Pyrausta cingulalis ab. bicingulalis W. P. Curtis, 1934; Pyrausta cingulata f. apenninalis Costantini, 1923; Pyrausta rectefascialis Toll, 1936; Pyrausta rectefasciata ab. schmidti Szent-Ivány, 1941

= Pyrausta cingulata =

Species of moth

Pyrausta cingulata, the silver-barred sable, is a species of moth of the family Crambidae. It was described by Carl Linnaeus in his 1758 10th edition of Systema Naturae. It is found in Europe.

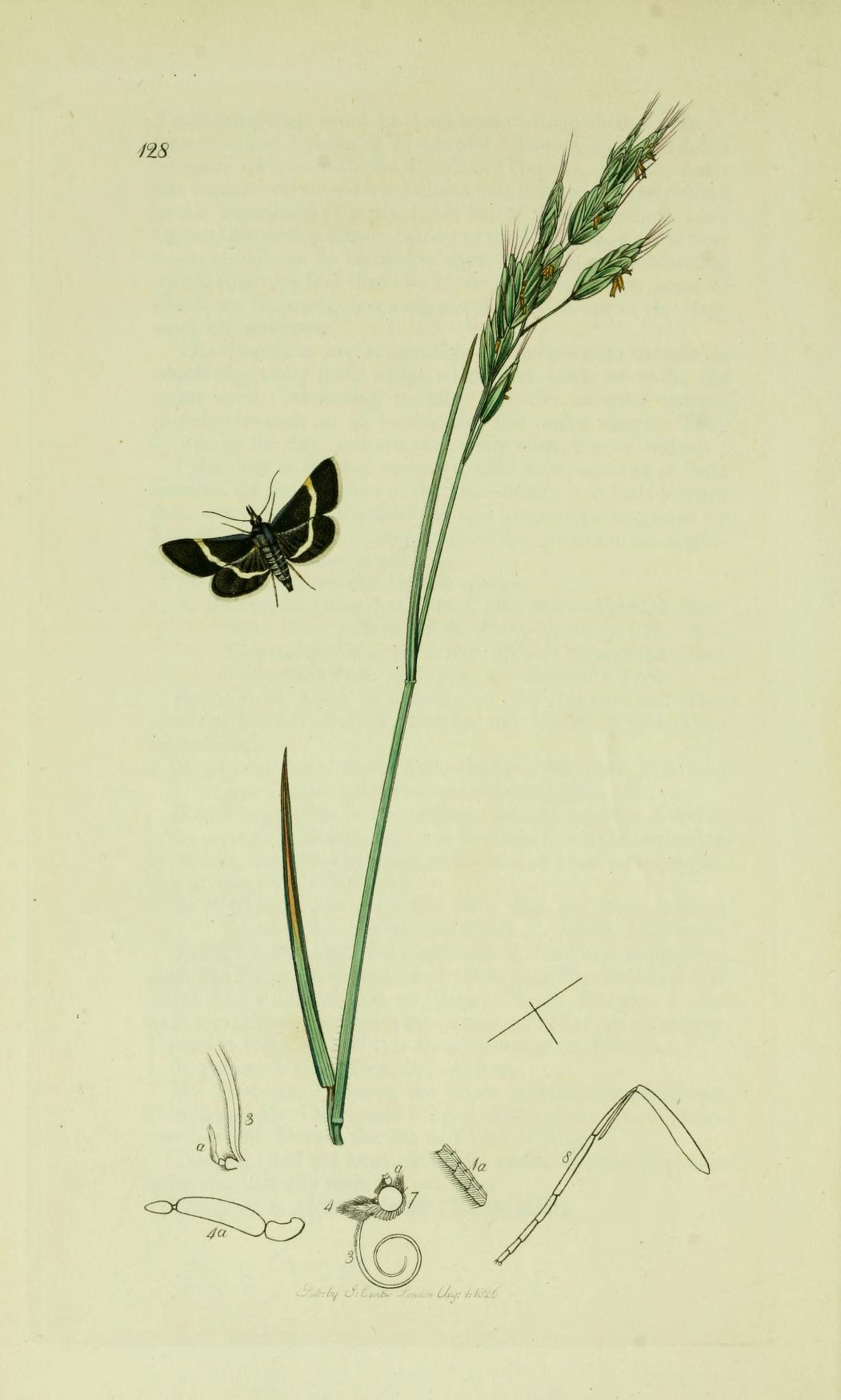
Illustration from John Curtis's British Entomology Volume 6

The wingspan is 14–18 mm. The forewings are blackish with a narrow very slightly sinuate white fascia beyond middle; tips of cilia white. Hindwings are as forewings, but fascia slightly curved. The moth flies from May to August depending on the location.

The larvae probably feed on wild thyme (Thymus polytrichus).
