= Coleophora pyrenaica =

Scientific classification
- Kingdom: Animalia
- Phylum: Arthropoda
- Clade: Pancrustacea
- Class: Insecta
- Order: Lepidoptera
- Family: Coleophoridae
- Genus: Coleophora
- Species: C. pyrenaica

Binomial name
- Coleophora pyrenaica Baldizzone, 1980

Species of moth

Coleophora pyrenaica is a moth of the family Coleophoridae. It is found in southern France and on the Iberian Peninsula.

The larvae feed on Thymus vulgaris. They create a trivalved, grey, tubular silken case of 6–7 mm long with a mouth angle of about 25°. The case is covered with detritus.
