= Coleophora jynxella =

Scientific classification
- Kingdom: Animalia
- Phylum: Arthropoda
- Clade: Pancrustacea
- Class: Insecta
- Order: Lepidoptera
- Family: Coleophoridae
- Genus: Coleophora
- Species: C. jynxella

Binomial name
- Coleophora jynxella Baldizzone, 1987

Species of moth

Coleophora jynxella is a moth of the family Coleophoridae. It is found in southern France and Spain.
