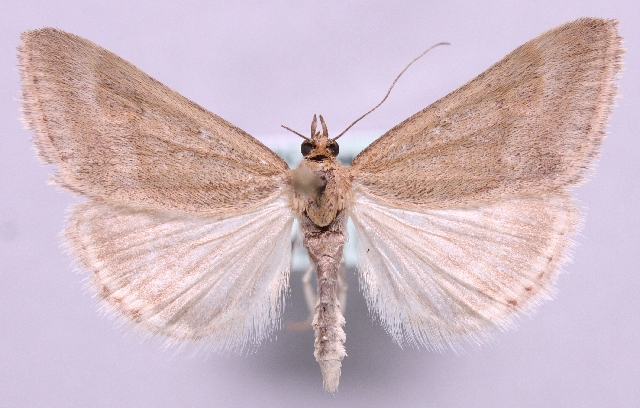

Scientific classification
- Kingdom: Animalia
- Phylum: Arthropoda
- Clade: Pancrustacea
- Class: Insecta
- Order: Lepidoptera
- Family: Crambidae
- Genus: Pyrausta
- Species: P. aerealis

Binomial name
- Pyrausta aerealis (Hubner, 1793)

Synonyms
- Phalaena Pyralis aerealis Hubner, 1793; Pyrausta aerealis ablutalis Eversmann, 1844; Panstegia aerealis afghanalis Amsel, 1970; Panstegia aerealis bandiamiralis Amsel, 1970; Pyrausta aerealis cinnamomalis (Zerny, 1914); Pyrausta aerealis glaucalis (Zerny, 1914); Pyrausta glaucalis Caradja, 1927; Pyrausta aerealis mauretanica Rebel, 1907; Pyralis aerealis opacalis Hübner, 1813; Phalaena obsoletalis Fabricius, 1794; Phalaena obsoletus Fabricius, 1798; Pyrausta aerealis ab. unicolor Thurner, 1941; Pyrausta aerealis unicolor Rebel, 1917; Pyrausta wockei Rebel, 1902; Scopula suffusalis Treitschke, 1829; Pyrausta meciti Koçak, 1987

= Pyrausta aerealis =

Species of moth

Pyrausta aerealis is a species of moth in the family Crambidae described by Jacob Hübner in 1793. It is found in most of Europe (except Portugal, Ireland, Great Britain, the Benelux, Norway, the Czech Republic, Croatia and Hungary). It has also been recorded from Kyrgyzstan, Kazakhstan, Afghanistan, China and Algeria.

The wingspan is 18–26 mm.

The larvae have been recorded feeding on Artemisia vulgaris, Thymus serpyllum, Scrophularia, Gnaphalium, Helichrysum and Thalictrum species.
