= Pyrausta acontialis =

Scientific classification
- Domain: Eukaryota
- Kingdom: Animalia
- Phylum: Arthropoda
- Class: Insecta
- Order: Lepidoptera
- Family: Crambidae
- Genus: Pyrausta
- Species: P. acontialis

Binomial name
- Pyrausta acontialis (Staudinger, 1859)

Synonyms
- Botys acontialis Staudinger, 1859; Botys acontalis var. senicalis Staudinger, 1859

Species of moth

Pyrausta acontialis is a species of moth in the family Crambidae. It is found in Spain, Portugal and France. It has also been recorded from Syria.

The wingspan is 15–16 mm.
