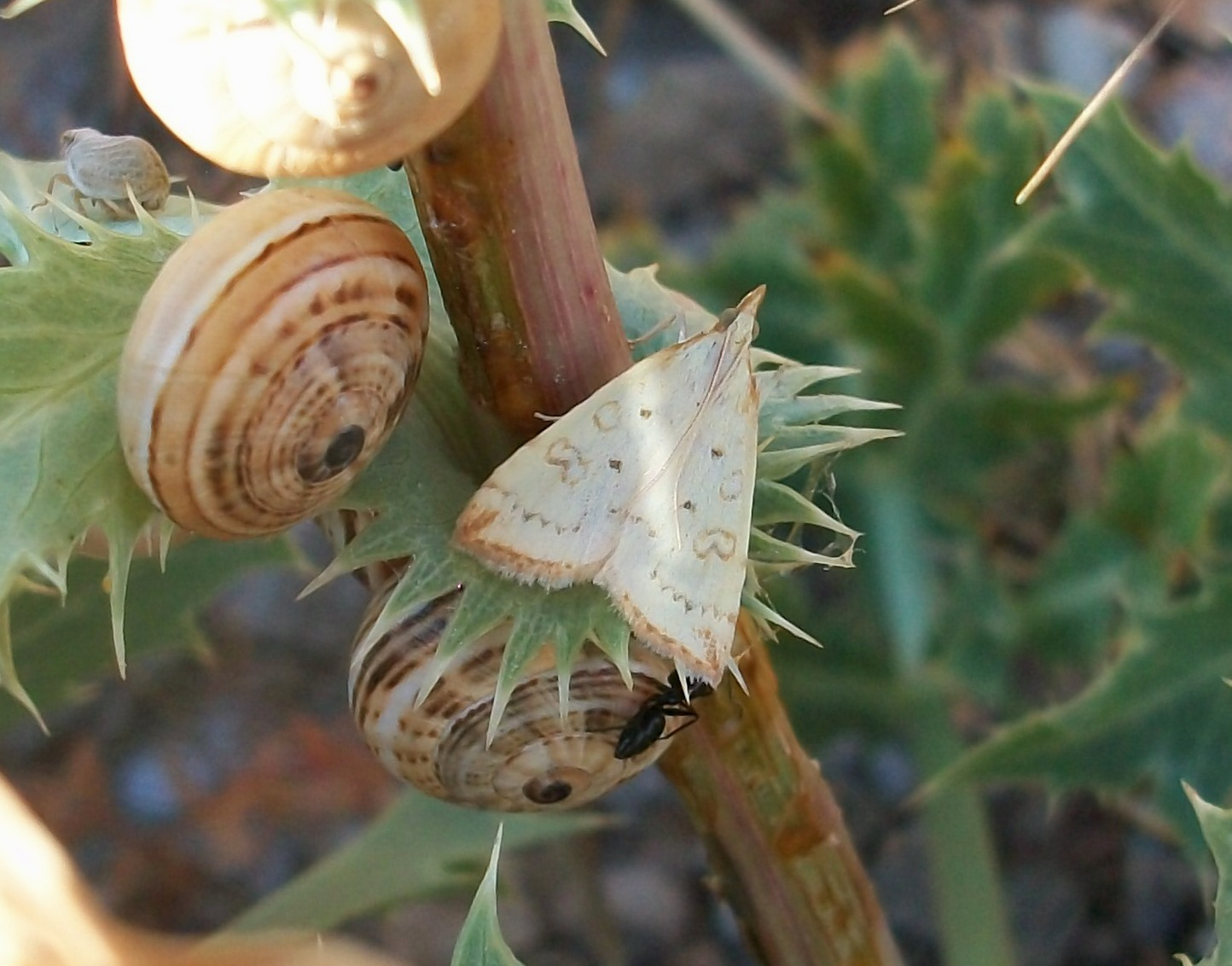

Scientific classification
- Kingdom: Animalia
- Phylum: Arthropoda
- Clade: Pancrustacea
- Class: Insecta
- Order: Lepidoptera
- Family: Crambidae
- Genus: Udea
- Species: U. institalis

Binomial name
- Udea institalis (Hubner, 1819)

Synonyms
- Pyralis institalis Hubner, 1819; Botys ferraralis Duponchel, 1833; Pyralis rutana Vallot, 1829; Udea focorum Fourcroy, 1785

= Udea institalis =

Species of moth

Udea institalis is a species of moth in the family Crambidae. It is found in Spain, France, Italy, Greece, the Republic of Macedonia, Romania, Slovakia, Ukraine and Russia.

The larvae feed on Eryngium campestre.
