= Coleophora fuscolineata =

Scientific classification
- Kingdom: Animalia
- Phylum: Arthropoda
- Class: Insecta
- Order: Lepidoptera
- Family: Coleophoridae
- Genus: Coleophora
- Species: C. fuscolineata

Binomial name
- Coleophora fuscolineata Walsingham, 1898

Synonyms
- Coleophora adjacentella Chrétien, 1908

Species of moth

Coleophora fuscolineata is a moth of the family Coleophoridae. It is found on Corsica.
