= Coleophora centaureivora =

Scientific classification
- Kingdom: Animalia
- Phylum: Arthropoda
- Clade: Pancrustacea
- Class: Insecta
- Order: Lepidoptera
- Family: Coleophoridae
- Genus: Coleophora
- Species: C. centaureivora

Binomial name
- Coleophora centaureivora Baldizzone, 1998

Species of moth

Coleophora centaureivora is a moth of the family Coleophoridae. It is found in France and Spain.

The larvae feed on the leaves of Centaurea aspera.
