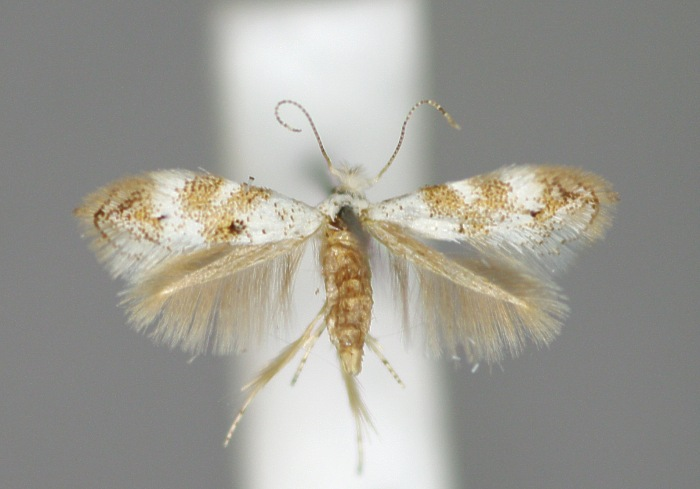

Scientific classification
- Kingdom: Animalia
- Phylum: Arthropoda
- Clade: Pancrustacea
- Class: Insecta
- Order: Lepidoptera
- Family: Bucculatricidae
- Genus: Bucculatrix
- Species: B. frangutella

Binomial name
- Bucculatrix frangutella (Goeze, 1783)

= Bucculatrix frangutella =

Species of moth

Bucculatrix frangutella is a moth of the family Bucculatricidae. It was described by Johann August Ephraim Goeze in 1783. It is found in Europe.

The wingspan is about 8 mm. The head is white, sometimes fuscous-mixed in middle. Forewings are white, sometimes more or less sprinkled with fuscous; oblique costal spots before and beyond middle, a third at apex, and one on middle of dorsum brownish-ochreous irrorated with dark fuscous, Plical and second discal stigmata black. Hindwings are grey. The larva is pale yellowish-green, anteriorly pinkish tinged; dorsal line darker; head pale brown. Segment 2 is brown-marked above.

Adults are on wing between June and July depending on the location.

The larvae mine the leaves of buckthorns (Rhamnus species), including common buckthorn (Rhamnus cathartica) as well as alder buckthorn (Frangula alnus).

== Gallery ==
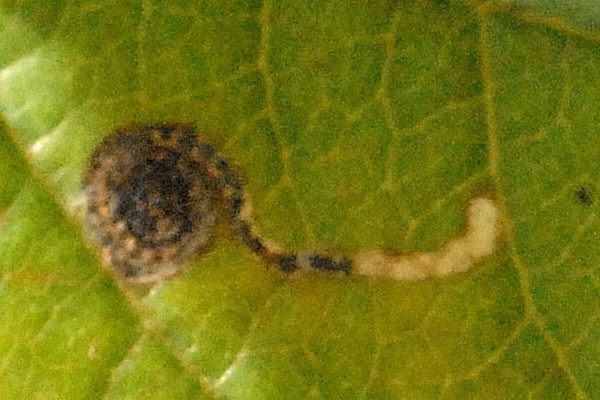
Mined leaf

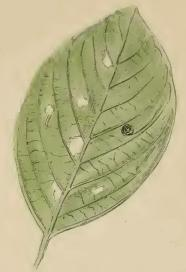
A mined and gnawed leaf of Rhamnus frangula

Larva

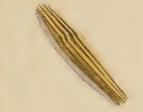
Cocoon
