= Coleophora lineata =

Scientific classification
- Kingdom: Animalia
- Phylum: Arthropoda
- Class: Insecta
- Order: Lepidoptera
- Family: Coleophoridae
- Genus: Coleophora
- Species: C. lineata

Binomial name
- Coleophora lineata Toll, 1960

Species of moth

Coleophora lineata is a moth of the family Coleophoridae. It is found in Spain and France.
