= Coleophora anitella =

Scientific classification
- Kingdom: Animalia
- Phylum: Arthropoda
- Clade: Pancrustacea
- Class: Insecta
- Order: Lepidoptera
- Family: Coleophoridae
- Genus: Coleophora
- Species: C. anitella

Binomial name
- Coleophora anitella Baldizzone, 1985

Species of moth

Coleophora anitella is a moth of the family Coleophoridae. It is found in France and Spain.

The larvae feed on Juncus acutus. They feed on the generative organs of their host plant.
