= Coleophora picardella =

Scientific classification
- Kingdom: Animalia
- Phylum: Arthropoda
- Class: Insecta
- Order: Lepidoptera
- Family: Coleophoridae
- Genus: Coleophora
- Species: C. picardella

Binomial name
- Coleophora picardella Suire, 1934

Species of moth

Coleophora picardella is a moth of the family Coleophoridae. It is found in France. Larvae can be found from late August to spring.
