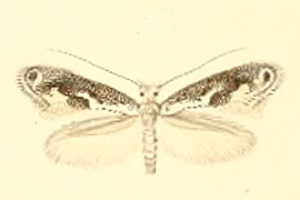

Scientific classification
- Kingdom: Animalia
- Phylum: Arthropoda
- Clade: Pancrustacea
- Class: Insecta
- Order: Lepidoptera
- Family: Bucculatricidae
- Genus: Bucculatrix
- Species: B. alaternella

Binomial name
- Bucculatrix alaternella Constant, 1890

= Bucculatrix alaternella =

Species of moth

Bucculatrix alaternella is a moth species in the family Bucculatricidae. The species was first described in 1890 by Alexandre Constant. It is found in France, Spain and Portugal.

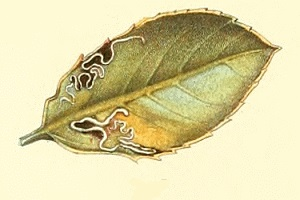
Mine

The wingspan is about 9 mm.

The larvae feed on Rhamnus alaternus. They mine the leaves of their host plant. Larvae can be found from October to November.
