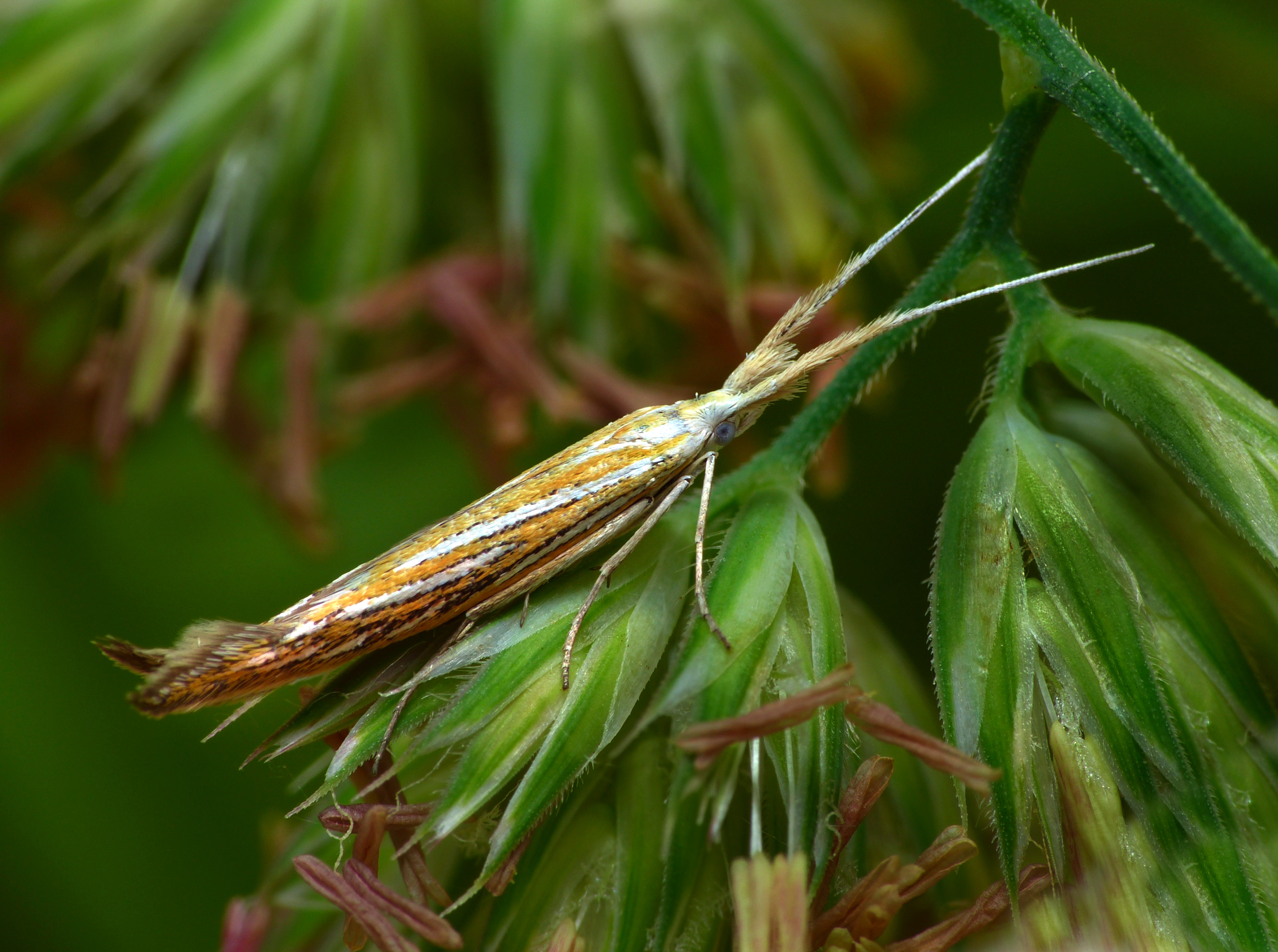
- Coleophora lixella Rough Bank, Gloucestershire, England
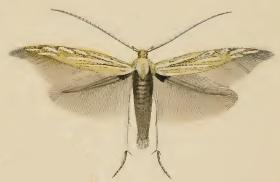

Scientific classification
- Kingdom: Animalia
- Phylum: Arthropoda
- Clade: Pancrustacea
- Class: Insecta
- Order: Lepidoptera
- Family: Coleophoridae
- Genus: Coleophora
- Species: C. lixella

Binomial name
- Coleophora lixella Zeller, 1849

= Coleophora lixella =

Species of moth

Coleophora lixella is a moth of the family Coleophoridae found in most of Europe. It was first described by Philipp Christoph Zeller in 1849.

== Description ==
The wingspan is about 19 mm. Adults have a yellow ground colour with dusky-outlined whitish streaks. They are on wing from July to August. The head is white, the crown yellow tinged. Antennae whitish, basal 2/5 clothed with hairs, basal joint with strong tuft. Forewings with apex falcate; yellow; a subcostal streak to before middle, a discal streak from before middle to 2/3, a streak along fold, and several short streaks between veins towards costa posteriorly and termen silvery-white, blackish-edged. Hindwings dark grey.

Larval foodplants include meadow foxtail (Alopecurus pratensis), sweet vernal grass (Anthoxanthum odoratum), downy oat-grass (Helictotrichon pubescens), common quaking grass (Briza media), soft brome (Bromus hordeaceus), cock's-foot (Dactylis glomerata), Elymus grasses, Yorkshire fog, (Holcus lanatus), Koeleria grasses and annual meadow grass (Poa annua). Larvae can be found from the end of August to the end of May.
