= Coleophora femorella =

Scientific classification
- Kingdom: Animalia
- Phylum: Arthropoda
- Class: Insecta
- Order: Lepidoptera
- Family: Coleophoridae
- Genus: Coleophora
- Species: C. femorella

Binomial name
- Coleophora femorella Walsingham, 1898

Species of moth

Coleophora femorella is a moth of the family Coleophoridae. It is found on Corsica.

The larvae possibly feed on the generative organs of Genista corsica.
