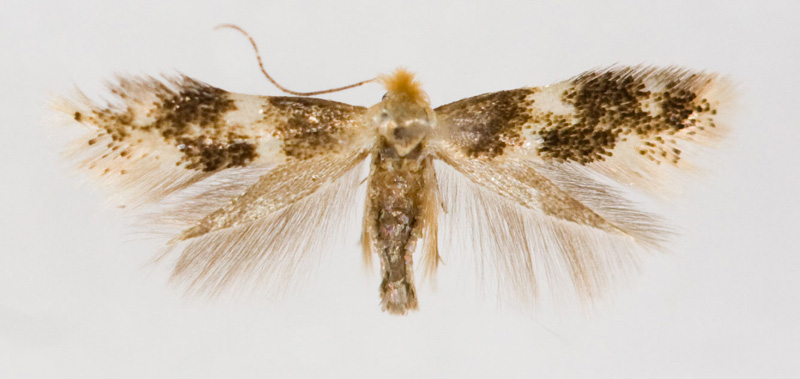

Scientific classification
- Kingdom: Animalia
- Phylum: Arthropoda
- Clade: Pancrustacea
- Class: Insecta
- Order: Lepidoptera
- Family: Bucculatricidae
- Genus: Bucculatrix
- Species: B. cidarella

Binomial name
- Bucculatrix cidarella (Zeller, 1839)

Synonyms
- Lyonetia cidarella Zeller, 1839

= Bucculatrix cidarella =

Species of moth

Bucculatrix cidarella is a moth of the family Bucculatricidae. It is found in most of Europe (except the Iberian Peninsula and the Balkan Peninsula), Kazakhstan and Japan (Honshu). It was described in 1839 by Philipp Christoph Zeller.

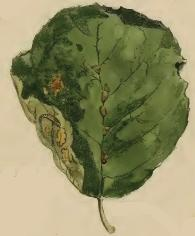
Alder leaf mined and gnawed

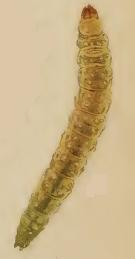
Externally feeding larva

The wingspan is 8–9 mm. The head is dull ferruginous, mixed with fuscous in middle. Antennal eyecaps white. Forewings are dark fuscous; two whitish costal spots before middle and at 3/4, and two on dorsum somewhat anterior to these; cilia ochreous-tinged. Hindwings are grey. The larva is yellowish -green, anteriorly reddish-tinged; dorsal line darker; dots whitish. The head is pale brown.

Adults are on wing May to June. At times there is a second generation in August.The larvae create a gallery mine in the leaves of alder, including common alder (Alnus glutinosa), grey alder (Alnus incana), green alder (Alnus viridis) or myrtle (Myrica gale).
