= Coleophora vulnerariae =

Scientific classification
- Kingdom: Animalia
- Phylum: Arthropoda
- Class: Insecta
- Order: Lepidoptera
- Family: Coleophoridae
- Genus: Coleophora
- Species: C. vulnerariae

Binomial name
- Coleophora vulnerariae Zeller, 1839

Species of moth

Coleophora vulnerariae is a moth of the family Coleophoridae. It is found from Norway and Sweden to the Iberian Peninsula, Italy and Greece and from Great Britain to the Baltic states, Romania and Bulgaria. It is also found in southern Russia.

The wingspan is 12–18 mm. Adults are on wing in June and July.

The larvae feed within seedpods of kidney vetch (Anthyllis vulneraria) in a movable case.
