= Coleophora iperspinata =

Scientific classification
- Kingdom: Animalia
- Phylum: Arthropoda
- Clade: Pancrustacea
- Class: Insecta
- Order: Lepidoptera
- Family: Coleophoridae
- Genus: Coleophora
- Species: C. iperspinata

Binomial name
- Coleophora iperspinata Baldizzone & Nel, 2003

Species of moth

Coleophora iperspinata is a moth of the family Coleophoridae. It is found in Spain and France.
