= Coleophora absinthivora =

Scientific classification
- Kingdom: Animalia
- Phylum: Arthropoda
- Clade: Pancrustacea
- Class: Insecta
- Order: Lepidoptera
- Family: Coleophoridae
- Genus: Coleophora
- Species: C. absinthivora

Binomial name
- Coleophora absinthivora Baldizzone, 1990

Species of moth

Coleophora absinthivora is a moth of the family Coleophoridae. It is found in France and Spain.

The larvae feed on Artemisia absinthium. They mine the leaves of their host plant.
