= Coleophora sattleri =

Scientific classification
- Kingdom: Animalia
- Phylum: Arthropoda
- Clade: Pancrustacea
- Class: Insecta
- Order: Lepidoptera
- Family: Coleophoridae
- Genus: Coleophora
- Species: C. sattleri

Binomial name
- Coleophora sattleri Baldizzone, 1995

Species of moth

Coleophora sattleri is a moth of the family Coleophoridae. It is found in France.
