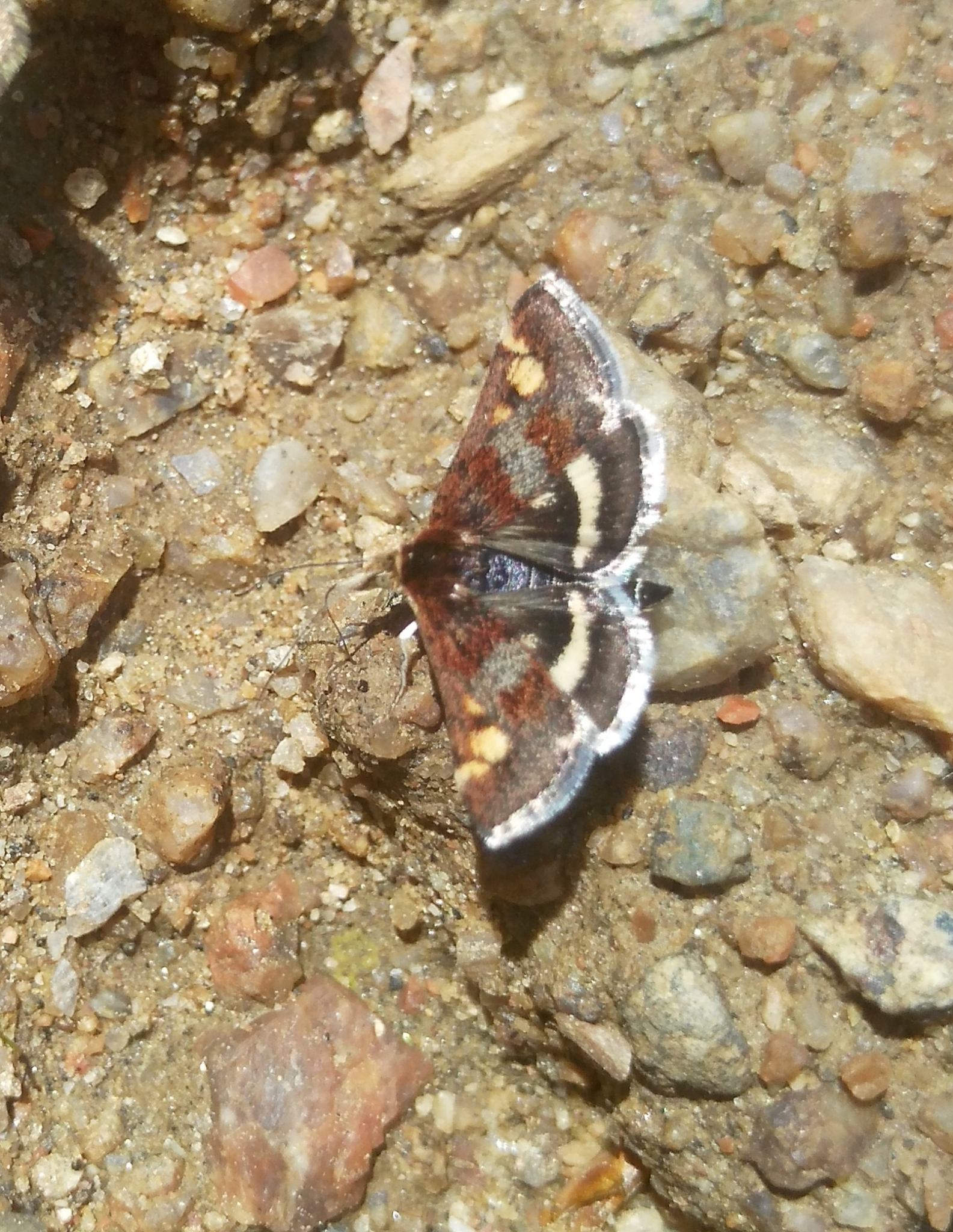

Scientific classification
- Domain: Eukaryota
- Kingdom: Animalia
- Phylum: Arthropoda
- Class: Insecta
- Order: Lepidoptera
- Family: Crambidae
- Genus: Pyrausta
- Species: P. porphyralis

Binomial name
- Pyrausta porphyralis (Denis & Schiffermuller, 1775)

Synonyms
- Pyralis porphyralis Denis & Schiffermuller, 1775; Pyralis coccinalis Hübner, 1796; Pyrausta chionealis Guenée, 1854

= Pyrausta porphyralis =

Species of moth

Pyrausta porphyralis is a species of moth in the family Crambidae described by Michael Denis and Ignaz Schiffermüller in 1775. It is found in most of Europe (except Ireland, Great Britain, Portugal, Croatia, Greece and Ukraine).

The wingspan is 15–18 mm.

The larvae have been recorded feeding on Mentha aquatica, Origanum and Helichrysum species.
