= Krombia venturalis =

Scientific classification
- Kingdom: Animalia
- Phylum: Arthropoda
- Clade: Pancrustacea
- Class: Insecta
- Order: Lepidoptera
- Family: Crambidae
- Genus: Krombia
- Species: K. venturalis

Binomial name
- Krombia venturalis Luquet & Minet, 1982

Species of moth

Krombia venturalis is a species of moth in the family Crambidae. It is found in France.
