= Coleophora staehelinella =

Scientific classification
- Kingdom: Animalia
- Phylum: Arthropoda
- Class: Insecta
- Order: Lepidoptera
- Family: Coleophoridae
- Genus: Coleophora
- Species: C. staehelinella

Binomial name
- Coleophora staehelinella Walsingham, 1891

Species of moth

Coleophora staehelinella is a moth of the family Coleophoridae. It is found in southern France and Spain.

The larvae feed on Staehelina dubia. Larvae can be found in spring.
