= Bucculatrix myricae =

Scientific classification
- Kingdom: Animalia
- Phylum: Arthropoda
- Clade: Pancrustacea
- Class: Insecta
- Order: Lepidoptera
- Family: Bucculatricidae
- Genus: Bucculatrix
- Species: B. myricae

Binomial name
- Bucculatrix myricae Ragonot, 1879

Species of moth

Bucculatrix myricae is a moth in the family Bucculatricidae. It was described by Émile Louis Ragonot in 1879. It is found in France, Spain, Portugal and Romania.

The wingspan is about 7 mm.

The larvae feed on Myrica species. Larvae can be found in July.
