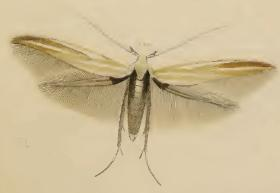

Scientific classification
- Kingdom: Animalia
- Phylum: Arthropoda
- Class: Insecta
- Order: Lepidoptera
- Family: Coleophoridae
- Genus: Coleophora
- Species: C. cracella

Binomial name
- Coleophora cracella (Vallot, 1835)

Synonyms
- Tinea cracella Vallot, 1835; Coleophora lugduniella Stainton, 1859

= Coleophora cracella =

Species of moth

Coleophora cracella is a moth of the family Coleophoridae. It is found in southern France and Spain and from Slovakia and Hungary to Bulgaria and southern Russia.

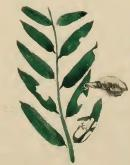
leaf of Vicia cracca eaten by the larva

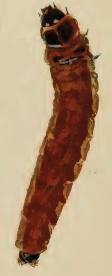
Larva

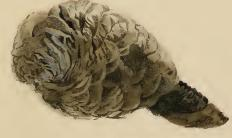
Larval case

The larvae feed on Vicia cracca. They create a large, blackish pistol case, almost entirely covered by a transparent pallium.
