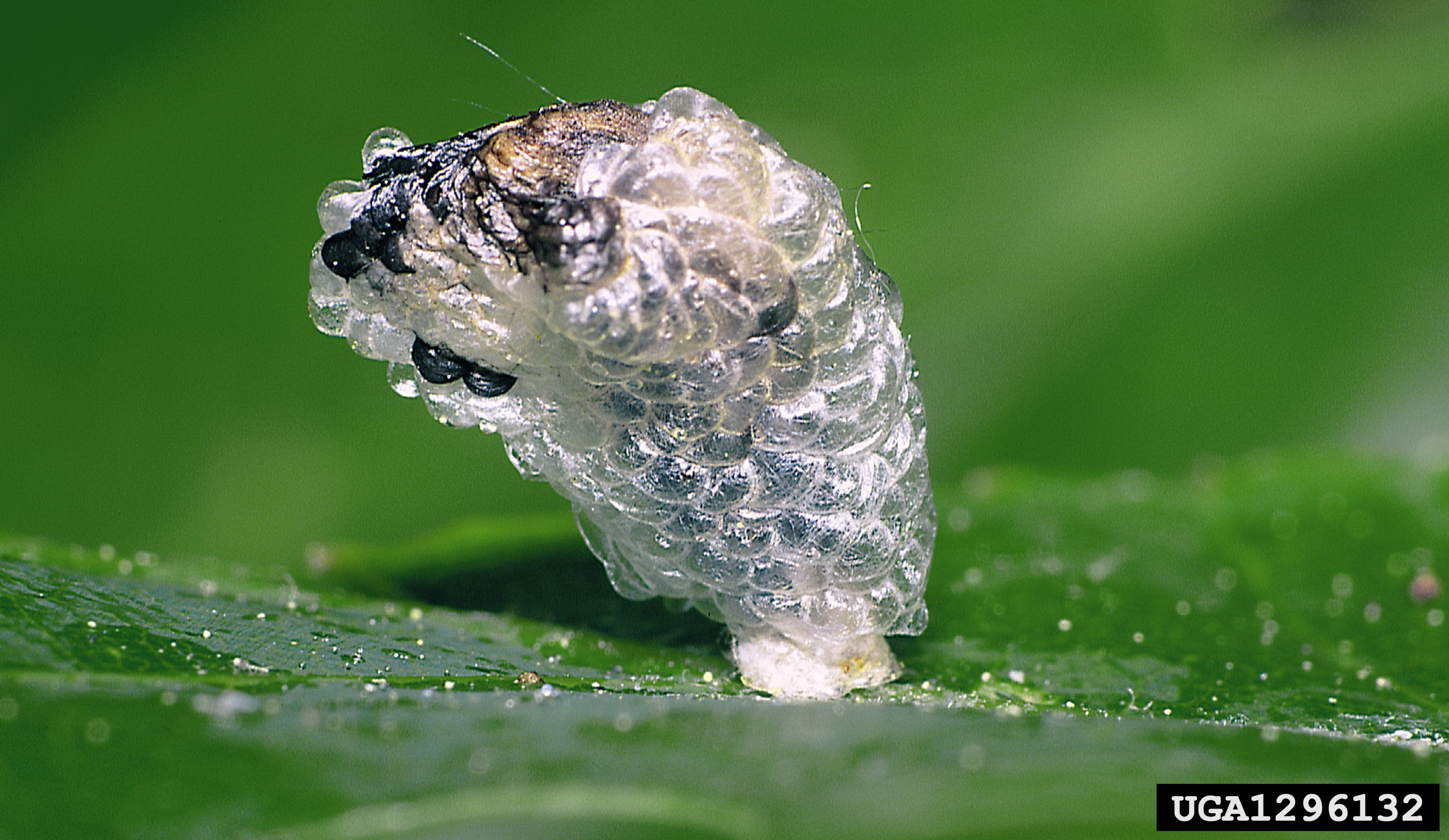
- Larval case

Scientific classification
- Kingdom: Animalia
- Phylum: Arthropoda
- Clade: Pancrustacea
- Class: Insecta
- Order: Lepidoptera
- Family: Coleophoridae
- Genus: Coleophora
- Species: C. kuehnella

Binomial name
- Coleophora kuehnella (Goeze, 1783)

Synonyms
- List: Coleophora palliatella; Tinea kuehnella; Tinea lamellifera; Tinea lamellatella; Tinea palliatella Zincken, 1783; Ornix pallipennella; Ornix auricigrandella; Coleophora enervatella

= Coleophora kuehnella =

Species of moth

Coleophora kuehnella is a moth of the family Coleophoridae. It was first described by Johann Goeze in 1783 and is found in Asia and Europe.

== Description ==
The wingspan is 14–17 mm. The moth flies from May to July depending on the location.

The larvae feed on oak (Quercus species), and supposedly also Prunus and willow (Salix species). Full-grown larvae can be found in early June.

== Distribution ==
It is found in Europe (from Italy, across Central Europe up to Southern Scandinavia), the Caucasus and Turkey.
