= Coleophora vestalella =

Scientific classification
- Kingdom: Animalia
- Phylum: Arthropoda
- Class: Insecta
- Order: Lepidoptera
- Family: Coleophoridae
- Genus: Coleophora
- Species: C. vestalella

Binomial name
- Coleophora vestalella Staudinger, 1859

Synonyms
- Coleophora balearica Falkovitsh, 1978

Species of moth

Coleophora vestalella is a moth of the family Coleophoridae. It is found in France, Spain and Mallorca.

Full-grown larvae can be found from May to June.
