= Coleophora dignella =

Scientific classification
- Kingdom: Animalia
- Phylum: Arthropoda
- Class: Insecta
- Order: Lepidoptera
- Family: Coleophoridae
- Genus: Coleophora
- Species: C. dignella

Binomial name
- Coleophora dignella Toll, 1961

Synonyms
- Coleophora kasyi Toll, 1961

Species of moth

Coleophora dignella is a moth of the family Coleophoridae. It is found in Spain, France, Italy, Germany, the Czech Republic, Austria, Romania, North Macedonia, Greece and southern and northern Russia.

The larvae feed on the seeds of Onobrychis species.
