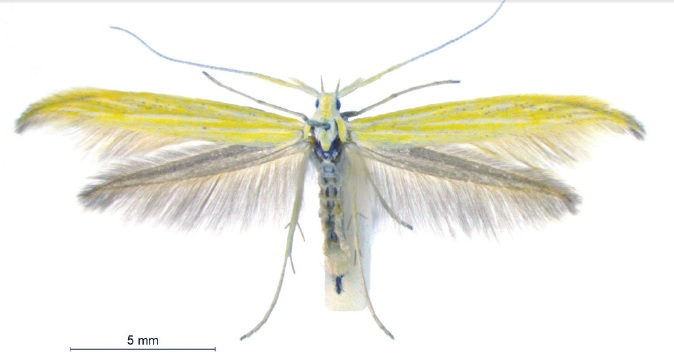

Scientific classification
- Kingdom: Animalia
- Phylum: Arthropoda
- Clade: Pancrustacea
- Class: Insecta
- Order: Lepidoptera
- Family: Coleophoridae
- Genus: Coleophora
- Species: C. nevadella

Binomial name
- Coleophora nevadella Baldizzone, 1985

= Coleophora nevadella =

Species of moth

Coleophora nevadella is a moth of the family Coleophoridae. It is found in Spain and France, specifically in the eastern Pyrénées.

Adults occur in July on blooming Nepeta latifolia plants, which are the likely oviposition (egg laying) host plant.
