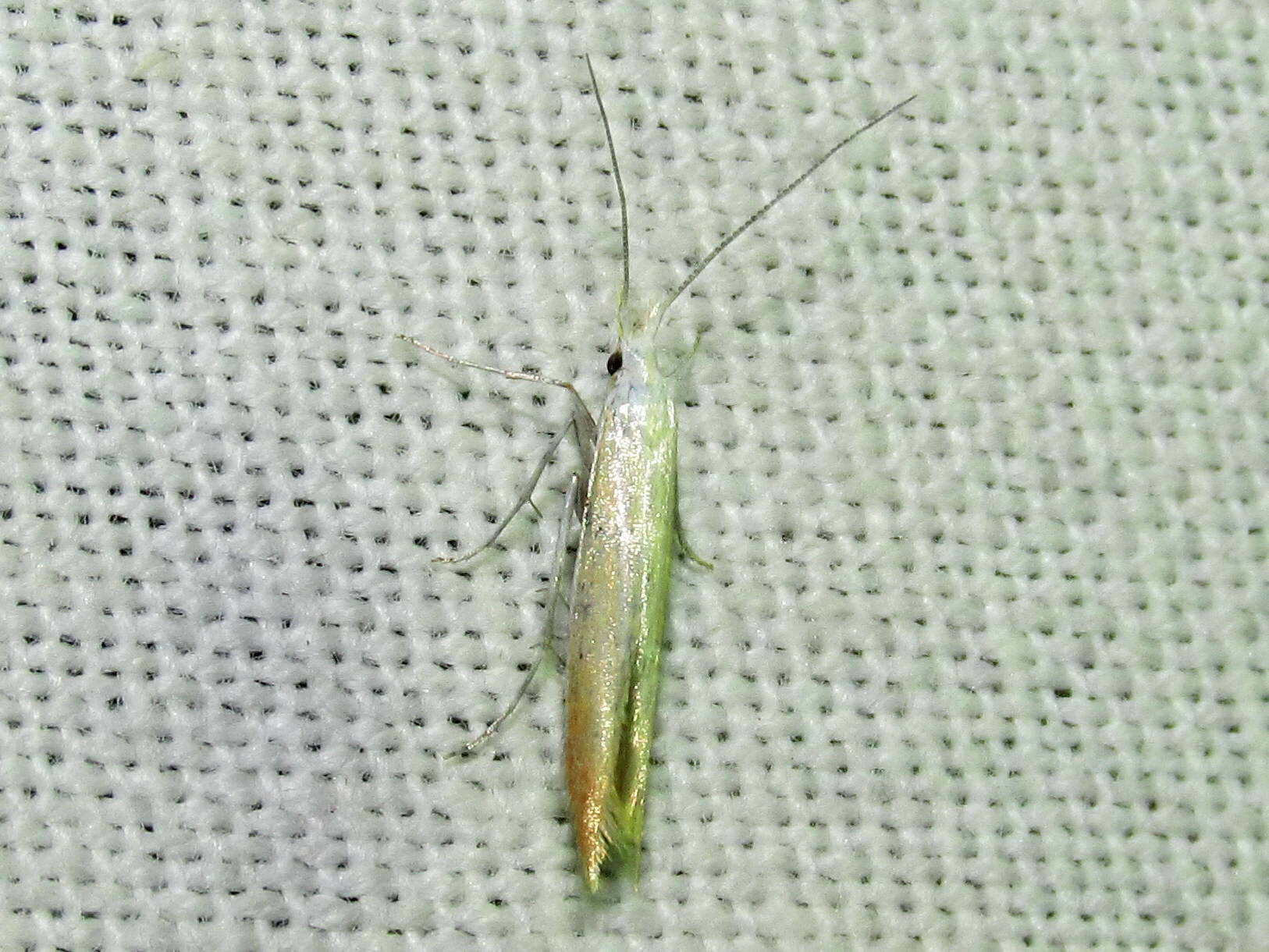

Scientific classification
- Kingdom: Animalia
- Phylum: Arthropoda
- Clade: Pancrustacea
- Class: Insecta
- Order: Lepidoptera
- Family: Coleophoridae
- Genus: Coleophora
- Species: C. coronillae

Binomial name
- Coleophora coronillae Zeller, 1849

= Coleophora coronillae =

Species of moth

Coleophora coronillae is a moth of the family Coleophoridae. It is found from Germany to Italy and Bulgaria and from Lithuania to the Iberian Peninsula. It is also found in southern Russia, Transcaucasia, central Asia and Iran.

The larvae feed on Coronilla varia. Larvae can be found from September to May.
