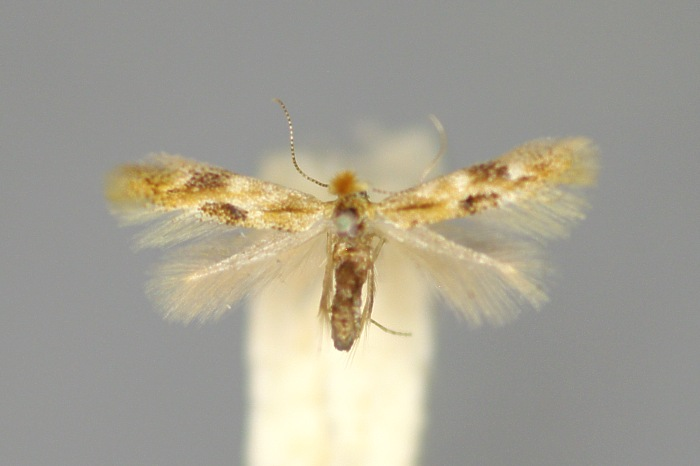

Scientific classification
- Kingdom: Animalia
- Phylum: Arthropoda
- Clade: Pancrustacea
- Class: Insecta
- Order: Lepidoptera
- Family: Bucculatricidae
- Genus: Bucculatrix
- Species: B. ulmella

Binomial name
- Bucculatrix ulmella Zeller, 1848

Synonyms
- Bucculatrix ulmella var. sircomella Stainton, 1848; Bucculatrix ulmella f. vetustella Stainton, 1846

= Bucculatrix ulmella =

Species of moth

Bucculatrix ulmella is a moth of the family Bucculatricidae. It is found in most of Europe, except the Iberian Peninsula, Slovenia and Bulgaria. It was first described in 1848 by Philipp Christoph Zeller.

The wingspan is 7–8 mm. The head is ferruginous, sometimes mixed with dark fuscous in middle. Antennal eyecaps ochreous-whitish. Forewings ochreous-whitish, irrorated with brown; four oblique costal spots, first and third large, and a large median dorsal spot dark fuscous; cilia more ochreous tinged. Hindwings are grey. The larva is pale grey-greenish; lateral line darker; dots whitish; head pale brown; segment 2 brownish-grey, black-dotted.

Adults are on wing from May to June and again in August.

The larvae feed on Castanea sativa, Quercus faginea, Quercus petraea, Quercus pubescens, Quercus robur, Quercus rubra and Quercus trojana. They mine the leaves of their host plant. Larvae can be found in July and again from September to October.

== Gallery ==
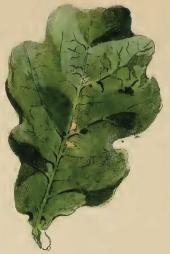
Mined oak leaf

Larva

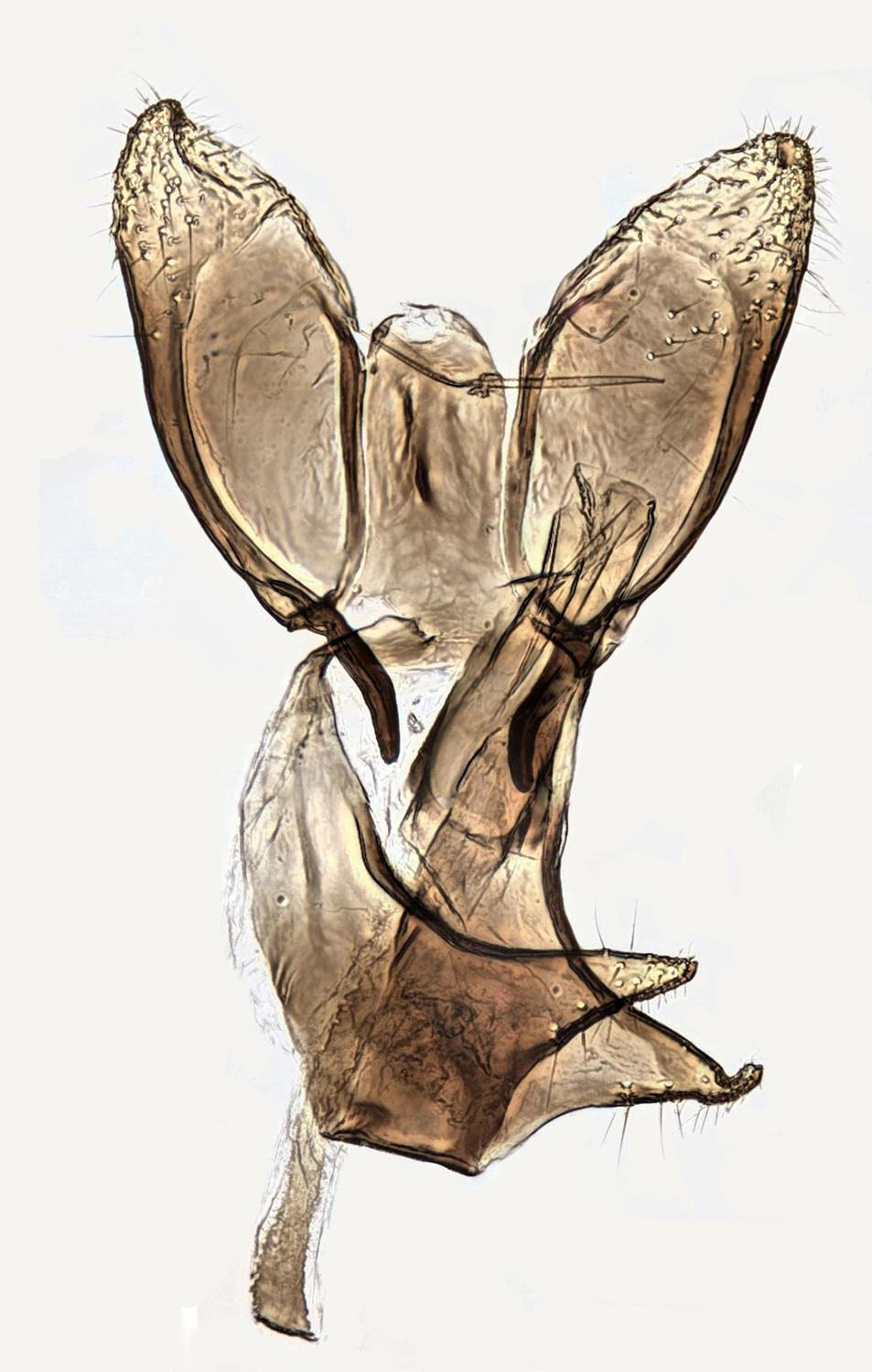
Male genitalia
