= Coleophora struella =

Scientific classification
- Kingdom: Animalia
- Phylum: Arthropoda
- Class: Insecta
- Order: Lepidoptera
- Family: Coleophoridae
- Genus: Coleophora
- Species: C. struella

Binomial name
- Coleophora struella Staudinger, 1859

Synonyms
- Coleophora clathrella Toll, 1960

Species of moth

Coleophora struella is a moth of the family Coleophoridae. It is found in France and on the Iberian Peninsula.

The larvae feed on Lavandula and Thymus vulgaris. They create a conical, light brown to greyish lobe case. The lobes are large and very neatly arranged transversely. Full-grown cases are found in April and May.
