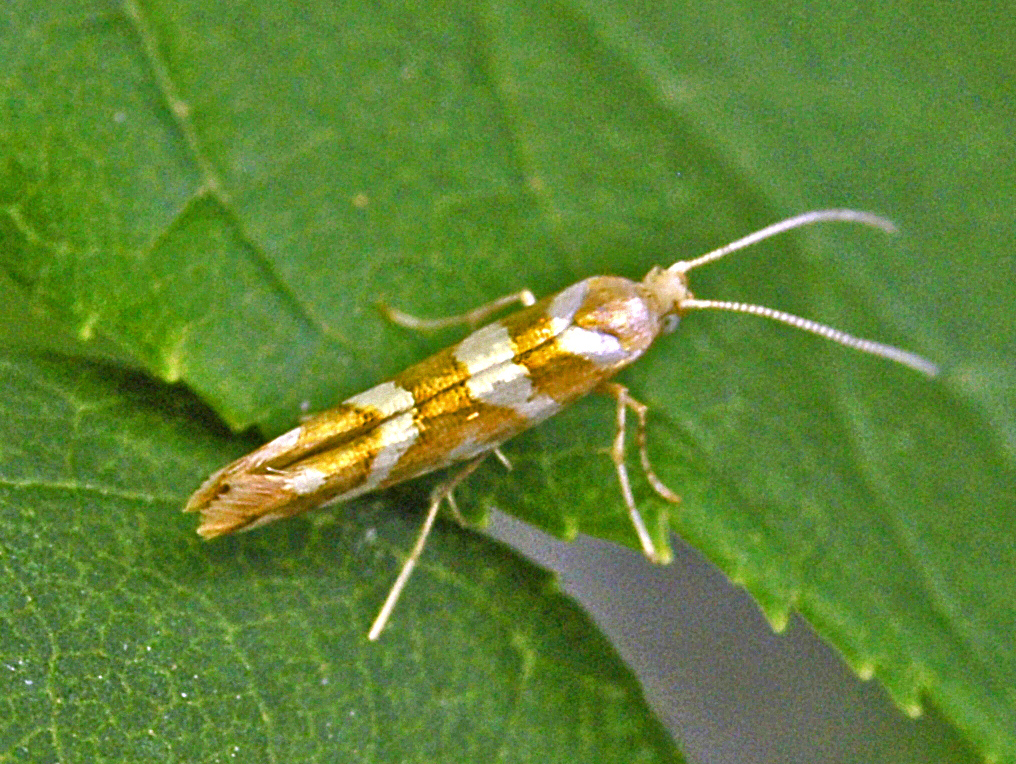
- Argyresthia goedartella, upperside
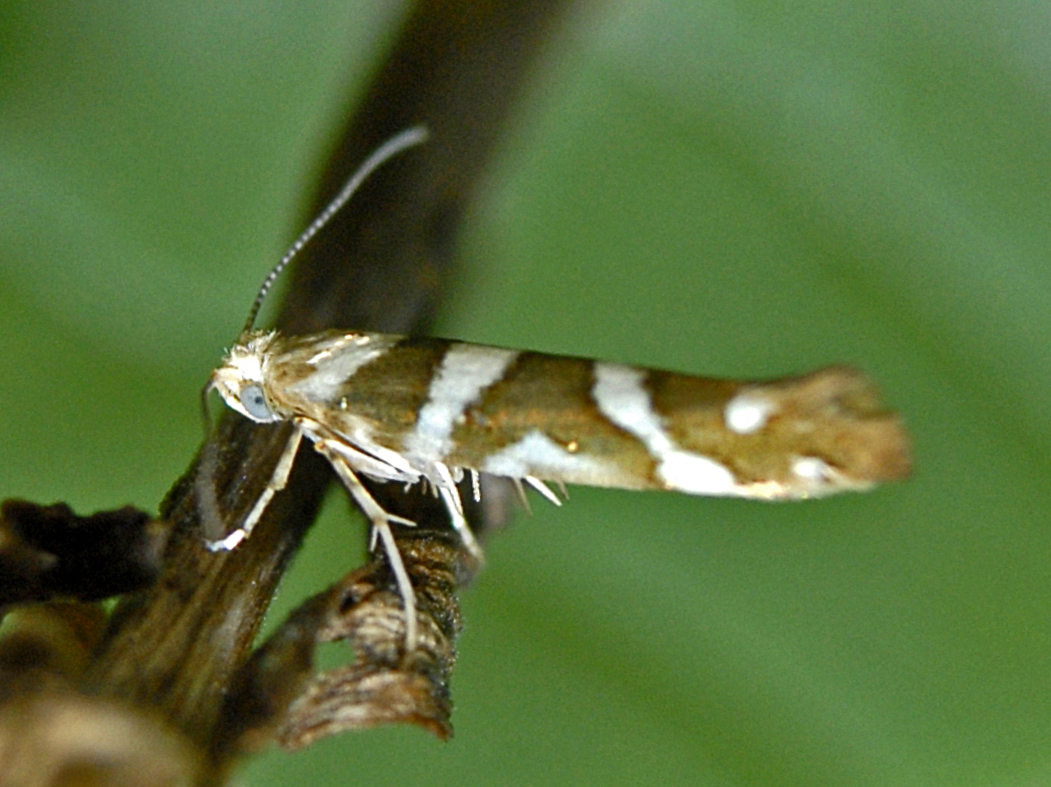
- Lateral view

Scientific classification
- Kingdom: Animalia
- Phylum: Arthropoda
- Clade: Pancrustacea
- Class: Insecta
- Order: Lepidoptera
- Family: Argyresthiidae
- Genus: Argyresthia
- Species: A. goedartella

Binomial name
- Argyresthia goedartella (Linnaeus, 1758)

Synonyms
- Phalaena goedartella Linnaeus, 1758; Argyresthia (Argyresthia) goedartella; Phalaena semi-argentella Donovan, 1793; Tinea literella Haworth, 1828

= Argyresthia goedartella =

Bronze alder moth

Species of moth

Argyresthia goedartella, the bronze alder moth, is a species of moth of the family Argyresthiidae.

== Distribution ==
This very common species can be found in most of Europe and in North America.

== Description ==
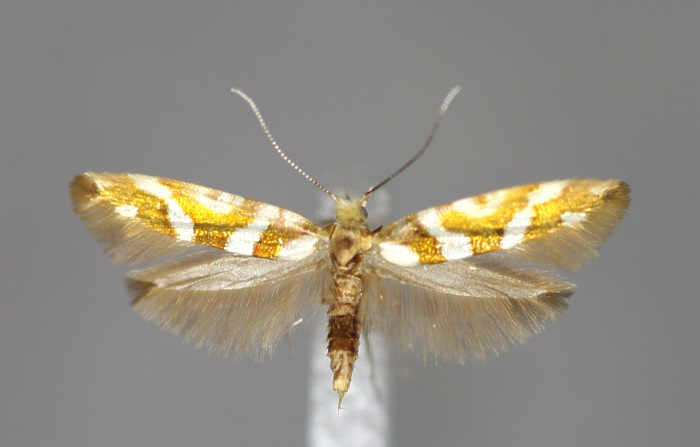
Mounted specimen

Argyresthia goedartella has a wingspan of 10–13 mm. These tiny moths have pale ochreous head with white antennae and white forewings with coppery-golden markings. A characteristic coppery-golden Y-shaped marking is present in the middle of the wings. Hindwings are dark gray. Abdomen is grayish fuscous, while legs are brownish white.

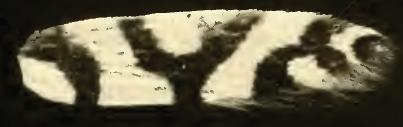
Wing

== Biology ==
It is a univoltine species. These moths fly from May to October. They fly at night and on sunny afternoons and mainly feed on the nectar of tansy (Tanacetum vulgare). The larvae feed on birch (Betula species) and alder (Alnus glutinosa). They overwinter in a shoot or hard male catkin of the host plants. In late March or April, larvae congregate and pupate in a cocoon under the bark.

== Notes ==
1. The flight season refers to Belgium and The Netherlands. This may vary in other parts of the range.
