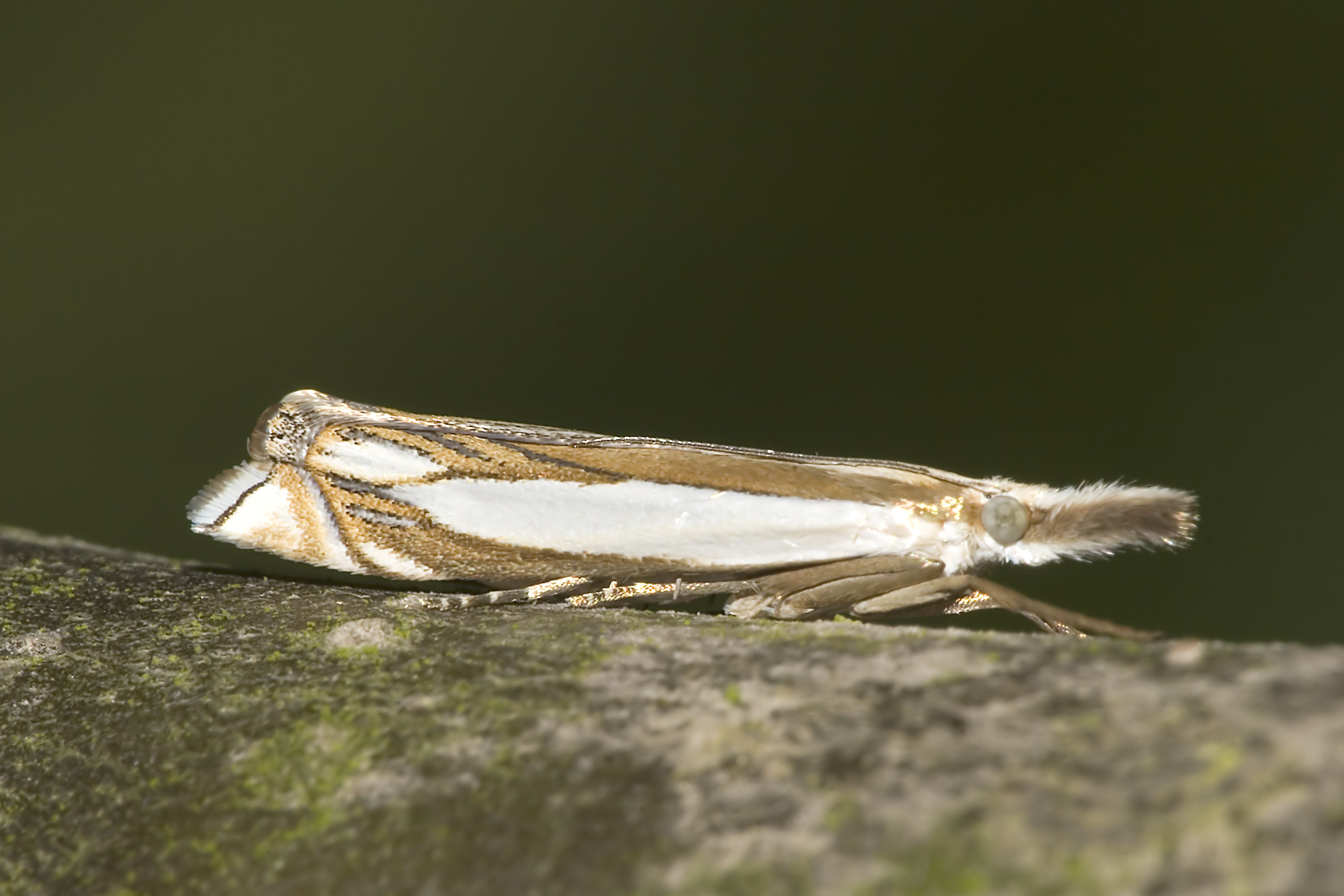

Scientific classification
- Kingdom: Animalia
- Phylum: Arthropoda
- Clade: Pancrustacea
- Class: Insecta
- Order: Lepidoptera
- Family: Crambidae
- Genus: Crambus
- Species: C. pascuella

Binomial name
- Crambus pascuella (Linnaeus, 1758)

Synonyms
- Phalaena (Tinea) pascuella Linnaeus, 1758; Crambus collutellus Fuchs, 1902; Crambus acutulellus Chrétien, 1896; Crambus acutellus (Rebel, 1901); Crambus fumipalpellus Mann, 1871; Crambus pascuellus f. obscurellus Kuchlein, 1958; Crambus scirpellus La Harpe, 1864; Crambus pascuella extinctellus Zeller in Staudinger, 1857; Crambus exctinctellus Bleszynski & Collins, 1962; Crambus pascuella floridus Zeller, 1872; Crambus pascualis Hübner, 1816; Palparia pascuea Haworth, 1811; Phalaena Tinea pascuum Fabricius, 1798

= Crambus pascuella =

Species of moth

Crambus pascuella is a species of moth of the family Crambidae. It is found in Europe and Asia Minor.

== Description ==
The wingspan is 20–24 mm. The forewings with apex triangularly produced; brownish - ochreous, posteriorly with whitish blackish - edged interneural streaks; a white dorsal streak; a broad shining white median longitudinal streak, reaching costa towards base, narrowed posteriorly, where it is cut by an oblique dark line, not passing second line; second line angulated, silvery-white, dark-edged anteriorly, preceded by a white costal spot and followed by a V - shaped mark; some black terminal longitudinal marks; cilia metallic. Hindwings are grey, more whitish dorsally. See also Parsons et al.

== Season ==
Grass Veneer moths are generally univoltine (one generation per year). Adults fly mainly from May to August, although the exact period varies geographically. In Poland, adults have been recorded from late May through August. In Belgium, they fly from late May until late August, occasionally later. In Britain, the main flight period is June to August, with regional records extending from late May to early September. In Bavaria, adults are reported from June to August.

== Diet ==
The larvae feed on various grasses, especially Poa species.
