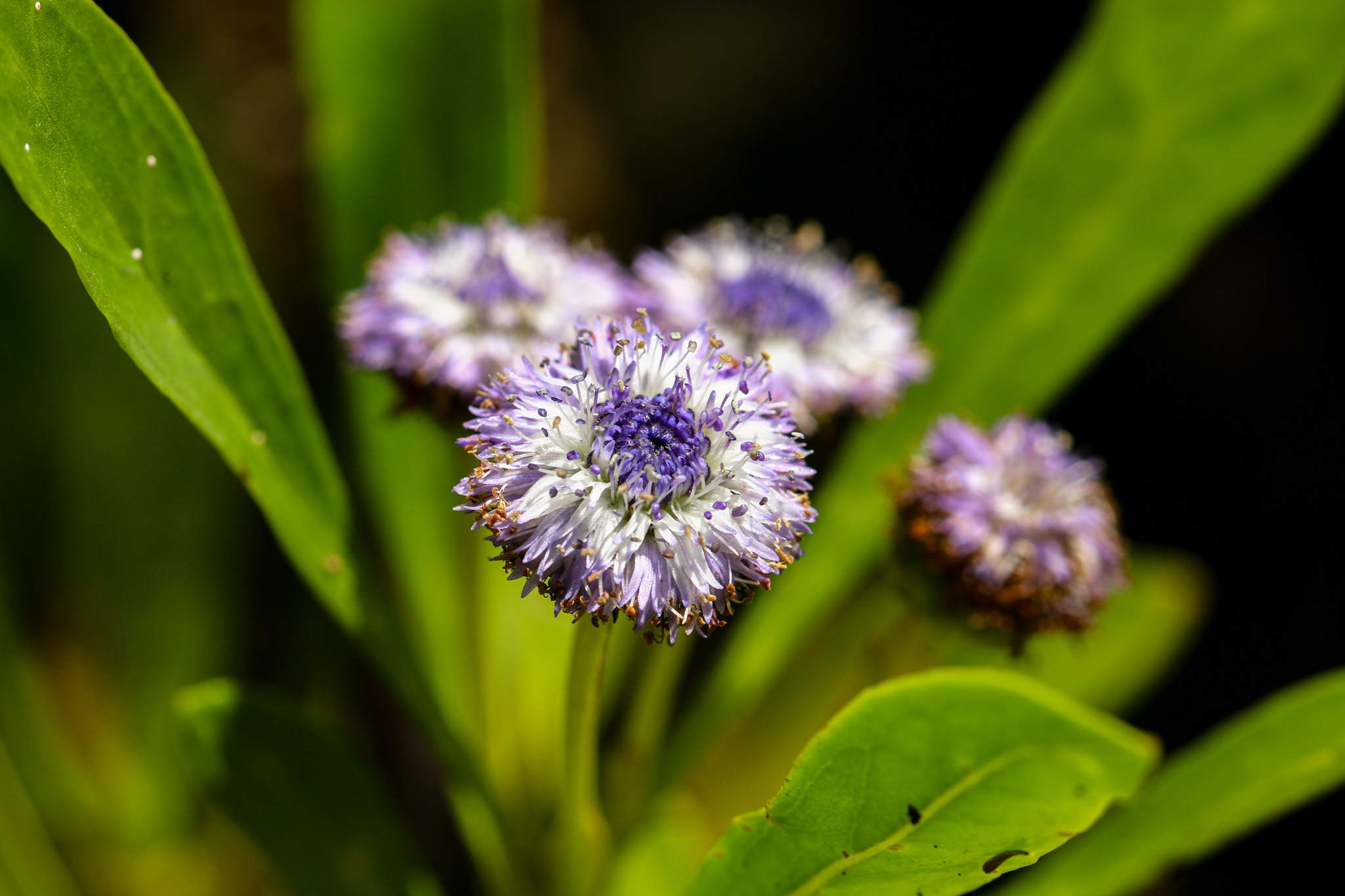
- Globularia amygdalifolia in the Topo do Coroa Nature Park on St.Antão

Conservation status
- Endangered (IUCN 3.1)

Scientific classification
- Kingdom: Plantae
- Clade: Tracheophytes
- Clade: Angiosperms
- Clade: Eudicots
- Clade: Asterids
- Order: Lamiales
- Family: Plantaginaceae
- Genus: Globularia
- Species: G. amygdalifolia

Binomial name
- Globularia amygdalifolia Webb

Synonyms
- Lytanthus amygdalifolius

= Globularia amygdalifolia =

Species of flowering plant

Globularia amygdalifolia is a flowering plant of the family Plantaginaceae. The species is endemic to Cape Verde. It is listed as an endangered species by the IUCN.

== Description ==
Moderately to strongly branched, erect, evergreen shrub, usually 0.5–1 m, occasionally up to 2 m high. Leaves alternate, clustered towards the apices of the branches, oblanceolate, rarely lanceolate, strongly attenuate towards base, up to 12 cm long and 3 cm wide, somewhat coriaceous, glabrous, apex acute, margin entire. Inflorescence adense, globular capitule up to 2.5 cm in diameter, situated axillary on peduncles 3 to 4 cm long; groups of 5 to 10 capitules clustered towards apices of branches; peduncles, involucre, calyx and the subfusiform receptacle pubescent. Calyx deeply 5-partite, with linear to lanceolate lobes. Corolla blue to whitish blue, zygomorphic; with trifid lower lip, destitute of adimerous lower lip; tube-like basal part adaxially open; stamens, 4 long exserted, one pair inserted in the basal third of the corolla; the upper pair inserted in the middle third of the corolla.

== Related taxa ==
Globularia amygdalifolia is most closely related to Globularia salicina Lam., which is distributed in Madeira and the Canary Islands, also to Globularia ascanii Bramwell & Kunkell and Globularia sarcophylla Svent. both endemic to the mountains of Gran Canaria. G. amygdalifolia is placed together with G. salicina in the subgenus Jasionopsis Schwarz section Lytanthus (Wettst.) Schwarz (Schwarz 1939, 1963). Globularia amygdalifolia is distinguished from G. salicina mainly by its larger leaves and capitules, somewhat more strongly divided calyx, narrower involucral scales and narrower corolla (Schwarz 1939.

== Variation ==
No significant variation has been observed. Old plants higher than 0.5–1 m are extremely rare today. Large plants up to 2 m are only known from outer escarpments of the central caldeira on Fogo as scattered relicts of a scrub vegetation type with old individuals of Artemisia gorgonum and Echium vulcanorum.

== Distribution and ecology ==
Globularia amygdalifolia is a western hygrophyte occurring on Santo Antão, São Nicolau, Santiago, Fogo and Brava, but is absent from São Vicente. It is mainly occurring in the subhumid and humid zones, but it has also been reported from the arid zone on Santiago. The main altitudinal distribution is between 400 m and 2200 m. The species has been recorded from below 100 m on Santiago. The uppermost records are from the caldeira rim on Fogo up to 2400 m (leg. Killian& Leyens). The plants grow on mountain slopes and less frequently in steep cliffs and they form a characteristic, but not dominating element of the indigenous montane scrub vegetation in the Cape Verde Islands.
