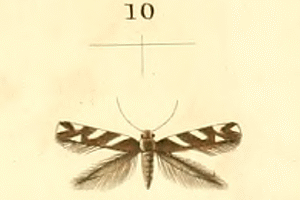

Scientific classification
- Domain: Eukaryota
- Kingdom: Animalia
- Phylum: Arthropoda
- Class: Insecta
- Order: Lepidoptera
- Family: Cosmopterigidae
- Genus: Eteobalea
- Species: E. albiapicella

Binomial name
- Eteobalea albiapicella (Duponchel, 1843)

Synonyms
- Lita albiapicella Duponchel, 1843

= Eteobalea albiapicella =

Species of moth

Eteobalea albiapicella is a moth in the family Cosmopterigidae. It is found in Spain, France, Germany, Switzerland, Austria, Italy, Corsica, the Czech Republic, Slovakia, Hungary, Croatia, Slovenia, Romania, North Macedonia, Greece, southern Russia and Turkey.

The wingspan is 10–12 mm. There are two generations per year with adults on wing from May to June and again from August to September.

The larvae feed on Globularia cordifolia, Globularia vulgaris, Globularia elongata and Globularia nudicaulis. Full-grown larvae live in the upper part of the pedicel and in the syncarp, which they reinforce with silk.
