= Nothris lemniscellus =

Scientific classification
- Kingdom: Animalia
- Phylum: Arthropoda
- Clade: Pancrustacea
- Class: Insecta
- Order: Lepidoptera
- Family: Gelechiidae
- Genus: Nothris
- Species: N. lemniscellus

Binomial name
- Nothris lemniscellus (Zeller, [1839])

Synonyms
- Ypsolophus lemniscellus Zeller, [1839]; Nothris lemniscella

Species of moth

Nothris lemniscellus is a moth of the family Gelechiidae. It was described by Philipp Christoph Zeller in 1839. It is found from Fennoscandia to the Pyrenees, Italy and Albania, and from France to Ukraine.

The wingspan is 18–22 mm. Adults have been recorded on wing from mid-July to August.

The larvae feed on Globularia cordifolia and Globularia punctata. They mine the leaves of their host plant. Larvae have been recorded in May, but also in November.
