= Eteobalea sexnotella =

Scientific classification
- Kingdom: Animalia
- Phylum: Arthropoda
- Clade: Pancrustacea
- Class: Insecta
- Order: Lepidoptera
- Family: Cosmopterigidae
- Genus: Eteobalea
- Species: E. sexnotella

Binomial name
- Eteobalea sexnotella (Chambers, 1878)

Synonyms
- Gelechia sexnotella Chambers, 1878; Stagmatophora sexnotella; Mompha sexnotella

Species of moth

Eteobalea sexnotella is a moth in the family Cosmopterigidae. It is found in North America, where it has been recorded from New Hampshire to Florida, as well as in Arkansas, Texas and Ontario.

The wingspan is about 17 mm. Adults have been recorded on wing in January and from March to September.

The larvae feed on Trichostema dichotomum and Trichostema suffrutescens in stem galls.
