= Nothris sabulosella =

Scientific classification
- Kingdom: Animalia
- Phylum: Arthropoda
- Clade: Pancrustacea
- Class: Insecta
- Order: Lepidoptera
- Family: Gelechiidae
- Genus: Nothris
- Species: N. sabulosella

Binomial name
- Nothris sabulosella Rebel, 1935

Species of moth

Nothris sabulosella is a moth in the family Gelechiidae. It was described by Hans Rebel in 1935. It is found in Asia Minor. The Global Lepidoptera Names Index has this name as a synonym of Nothris sulcella.

The wingspan is 21–32 mm.
