= Eteobalea alypella =

Scientific classification
- Kingdom: Animalia
- Phylum: Arthropoda
- Clade: Pancrustacea
- Class: Insecta
- Order: Lepidoptera
- Family: Cosmopterigidae
- Genus: Eteobalea
- Species: E. alypella

Binomial name
- Eteobalea alypella (Klimesch, 1946)

Synonyms
- Stagmatophora alypella Klimesch, 1946

Species of moth

Eteobalea alypella is a moth in the family Cosmopterigidae. It is found in Spain, France, Italy and Morocco.

The wingspan is 10–11 mm. Adults are on wing in June.

The larvae feed on the flowers of Globularia alypum. Larvae are full-grown at the end of October and overwinter in the seed pod. Pupation takes place in spring.
