= Eteobalea aglaopa =

Scientific classification
- Kingdom: Animalia
- Phylum: Arthropoda
- Class: Insecta
- Order: Lepidoptera
- Family: Cosmopterigidae
- Genus: Eteobalea
- Species: E. aglaopa

Binomial name
- Eteobalea aglaopa (Meyrick, 1928)

Synonyms
- Stagmatophora aglaopa Meyrick, 1928

Species of moth

Eteobalea aglaopa is a moth in the family Cosmopterigidae. It is found in Uganda.
