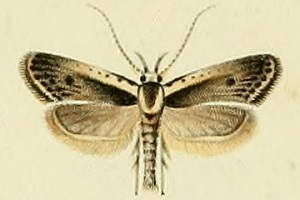
- Nothris congressariella

Scientific classification
- Kingdom: Animalia
- Phylum: Arthropoda
- Clade: Pancrustacea
- Class: Insecta
- Order: Lepidoptera
- Family: Gelechiidae
- Subfamily: Anacampsinae
- Tribe: Chelariini
- Genus: Nothris; Hübner, 1825

= Nothris =

Genus of moths

Nothris is a genus of moths in the family Gelechiidae.

== Species ==
- Nothris congressariella (Bruand, 1858)
- Nothris hastata (Meyrick, 1918)
- Nothris leuca Filipjev, 1928
- Nothris lemniscellus (Zeller, 1839)
- Nothris radiata (Staudinger, 1879)
- Nothris sabulosella Rebel, 1935
- Nothris sulcella Staudinger, 1859
- Nothris verbascella (Denis & Schiffermuller, 1775)

== Excluded species ==
- Nothris mesophracta Turner, 1919
- Nothris ochracella Turati, 1926

== Status unclear ==
- Nothris umbrella (Denis & Schiffermüller, 1775), described as Tinea umbrella
