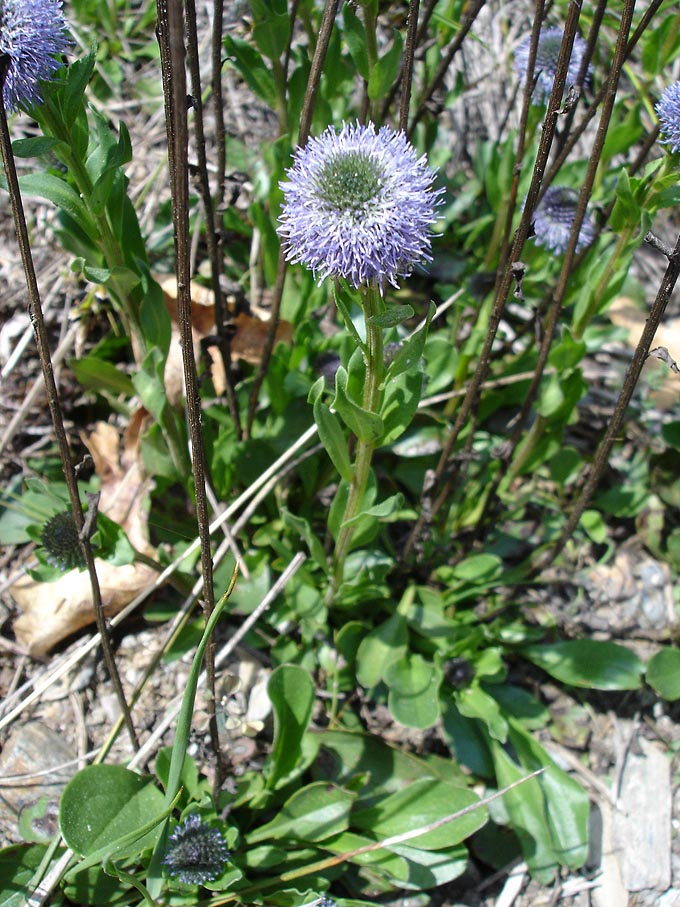

Scientific classification
- Kingdom: Plantae
- Clade: Embryophytes
- Clade: Tracheophytes
- Clade: Angiosperms
- Clade: Eudicots
- Clade: Asterids
- Order: Lamiales
- Family: Plantaginaceae
- Genus: Globularia
- Species: G. vulgaris

Binomial name
- Globularia vulgaris L.

= Globularia vulgaris =

Species of flowering plant in the plantain family

Globularia vulgaris is a plant belonging to the genus Globularia, in the family Plantaginaceae.

It has a very disjunct distribution: One population in the mountains of southern France and north-central and eastern Spain; and another population on the islands Öland and Gotland in the Baltic Sea.

It differs from Globularia trichosantha of the Balkans and Crimea by lacking stolons and having the teeth of the calyx as long as (or slightly longer) than its tube (3–4 times longer in G. trichosantha).
