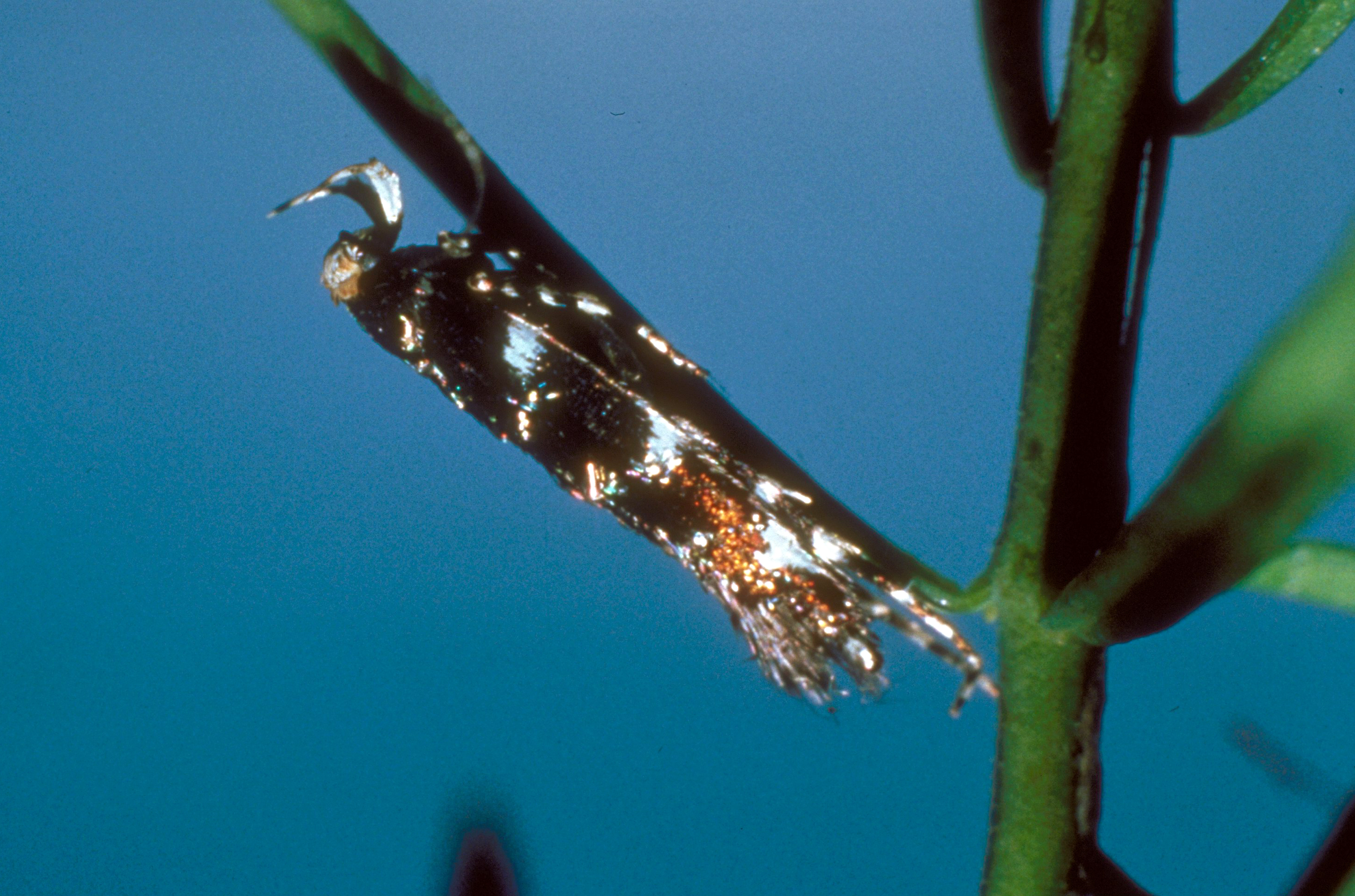

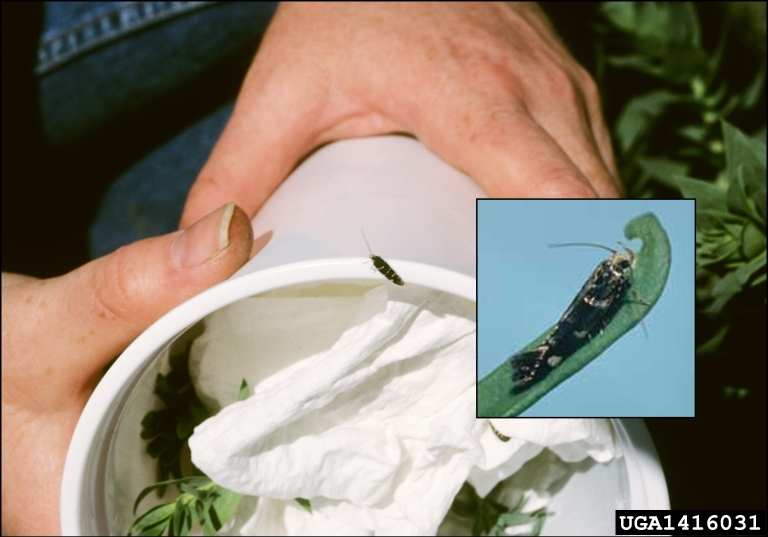

Scientific classification
- Kingdom: Animalia
- Phylum: Arthropoda
- Clade: Pancrustacea
- Class: Insecta
- Order: Lepidoptera
- Family: Cosmopterigidae
- Genus: Eteobalea
- Species: E. intermediella

Binomial name
- Eteobalea intermediella (Riedl, 1966)

Synonyms
- Stagmatophora intermediella Riedl, 1966

= Eteobalea intermediella =

Species of moth

Eteobalea intermediella is a moth of the family Cosmopterigidae. It is native to an area ranging from Central and Southern Europe, east to the Caucasus, Asia Minor, the Near and Middle East towards Central Asia. It is also present in North Africa (Morocco, Algeria and Tunisia). It has been introduced to the United States and Canada.

The wingspan is 16–18 mm. Adults are on wing from late April to early November in one to two generations.

The larvae feed on the roots of Linaria vulgaris, Linaria genistifolia, Linaria pontica, Linaria dalmatica and Anarrhinum bellidifolium.
