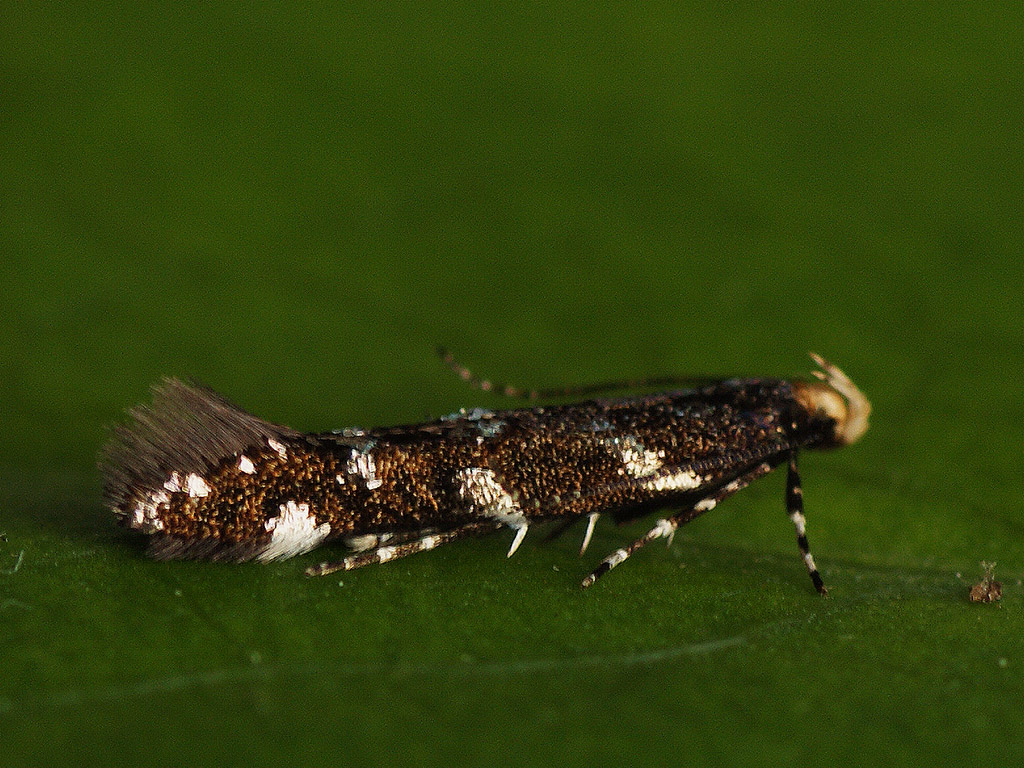

Scientific classification
- Domain: Eukaryota
- Kingdom: Animalia
- Phylum: Arthropoda
- Class: Insecta
- Order: Lepidoptera
- Family: Cosmopterigidae
- Genus: Eteobalea
- Species: E. anonymella

Binomial name
- Eteobalea anonymella (Riedl, 1965)

Synonyms
- Stagmatophora anonymella Riedl, 1965

= Eteobalea anonymella =

Species of moth

Eteobalea anonymella is a moth in the family Cosmopterigidae. It is found in most of Europe, except the Benelux, Great Britain, Ireland, Iceland, Norway and Denmark.

The wingspan is 9–13 mm. Adults are on wing from May to mid-August. There is probably a second generation with adults on wing from the end of August to the beginning of September.
