= Eteobalea siciliae =

Scientific classification
- Domain: Eukaryota
- Kingdom: Animalia
- Phylum: Arthropoda
- Class: Insecta
- Order: Lepidoptera
- Family: Cosmopterigidae
- Genus: Eteobalea
- Species: E. siciliae

Binomial name
- Eteobalea siciliae (Riedl, 1966)

Synonyms
- Stagmatophora siciliae Riedl, 1966

Species of moth

Eteobalea siciliae is a moth in the family Cosmopterigidae. It is found on Sicily, as well as in Algeria and Turkey.

The wingspan is about 13–14 mm. Adults have been recorded in June and from August to the beginning of September.
