= Eteobalea beata =

Scientific classification
- Domain: Eukaryota
- Kingdom: Animalia
- Phylum: Arthropoda
- Class: Insecta
- Order: Lepidoptera
- Family: Cosmopterigidae
- Genus: Eteobalea
- Species: E. beata

Binomial name
- Eteobalea beata (Walsingham, 1907)

Synonyms
- Stagmatophora beata Walsingham, 1907

Species of moth

Eteobalea beata is a moth in the family Cosmopterigidae. It is found in France, Spain, Portugal, Italy, Romania, Russia and Turkey.

The wingspan is about 20 mm. The forewings are bronzy black with three white costal patches. The hindwings are shiny, pale leaden grey. Adults are on wing from May to August.

Larvae have been recorded on Antirrhinum species.
