= Nothris radiata =

Scientific classification
- Domain: Eukaryota
- Kingdom: Animalia
- Phylum: Arthropoda
- Class: Insecta
- Order: Lepidoptera
- Family: Gelechiidae
- Genus: Nothris
- Species: N. radiata

Binomial name
- Nothris radiata (Staudinger, 1879)

Synonyms
- Depressaria radiata Staudinger, 1879

Species of moth

Nothris radiata is a moth in the family Gelechiidae. It was described by Otto Staudinger in 1879. It is found in Asia Minor and North Macedonia.

The wingspan is 23–26 mm. The forewings are yellowish grey with the veins streaked with black and with three black dots. The hindwings are light grey.
