= Eteobalea vinsoni =

Scientific classification
- Kingdom: Animalia
- Phylum: Arthropoda
- Class: Insecta
- Order: Lepidoptera
- Family: Cosmopterigidae
- Genus: Eteobalea
- Species: E. vinsoni

Binomial name
- Eteobalea vinsoni (Viette, 1953)

Synonyms
- Stagmatophora vinsoni Viette, 1953; Stagmatophora vinsonella abcedella Viette,1957

Species of moth

Eteobalea vinsoni is a moth in the family Cosmopterigidae. It is found on Mauritius and Réunion in the Indian Ocean.

== Subspecies ==
- Eteobalea vinsoni vinsoni (Viette, 1953) - from Mauritius
- Eteobalea vinsoni abcedella (Viette, 1957) - from Réunion
