= Eteobalea serratella =

Scientific classification
- Kingdom: Animalia
- Phylum: Arthropoda
- Clade: Pancrustacea
- Class: Insecta
- Order: Lepidoptera
- Family: Cosmopterigidae
- Genus: Eteobalea
- Species: E. serratella

Binomial name
- Eteobalea serratella (Treitschke, 1833)

Synonyms
- Oecophora serratella Treitschke, 1833; Stagmatophora cinereocapitella Caradja, 1920; Stagmatophora sareptensis Walsingham, 1907; Phalaena gronoviella Scopoli, 1772 (nomen dubium); Eteobalea gronoviella

Species of moth

Eteobalea serratella is a moth in the family Cosmopterigidae. It is found in most of Europe, except the Benelux, Great Britain, Ireland, Iceland, Fennoscandia and the Baltic states. It was approved for release in the United States in 1995 for the biological control of toadflax. A few field releases have been made in western Canada and the western United States, but no established populations have been confirmed.

The wingspan is 16–18 mm. There is one generation per year.

The larvae feed on Linaria vulgaris. They are off-white with brown heads. They develop through five instars and reach a length of up to 12 mm.
