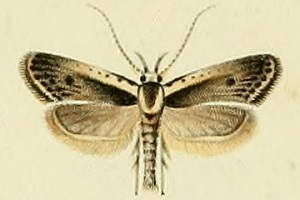

Scientific classification
- Domain: Eukaryota
- Kingdom: Animalia
- Phylum: Arthropoda
- Class: Insecta
- Order: Lepidoptera
- Family: Gelechiidae
- Genus: Nothris
- Species: N. congressariella

Binomial name
- Nothris congressariella (Bruand, 1858)

Synonyms
- Ypsolopha congressariella Bruand, 1858; Nothris declaratella Staudinger, 1859

= Nothris congressariella =

Species of moth

Nothris congressariella is a moth in the family Gelechiidae. It was described by Charles Théophile Bruand d'Uzelle in 1858. It is found in Great Britain, Portugal, Spain, France, Switzerland, Italy, North Macedonia, Greece, and on Crete, Sardinia, Sicily and the Canary Islands.
