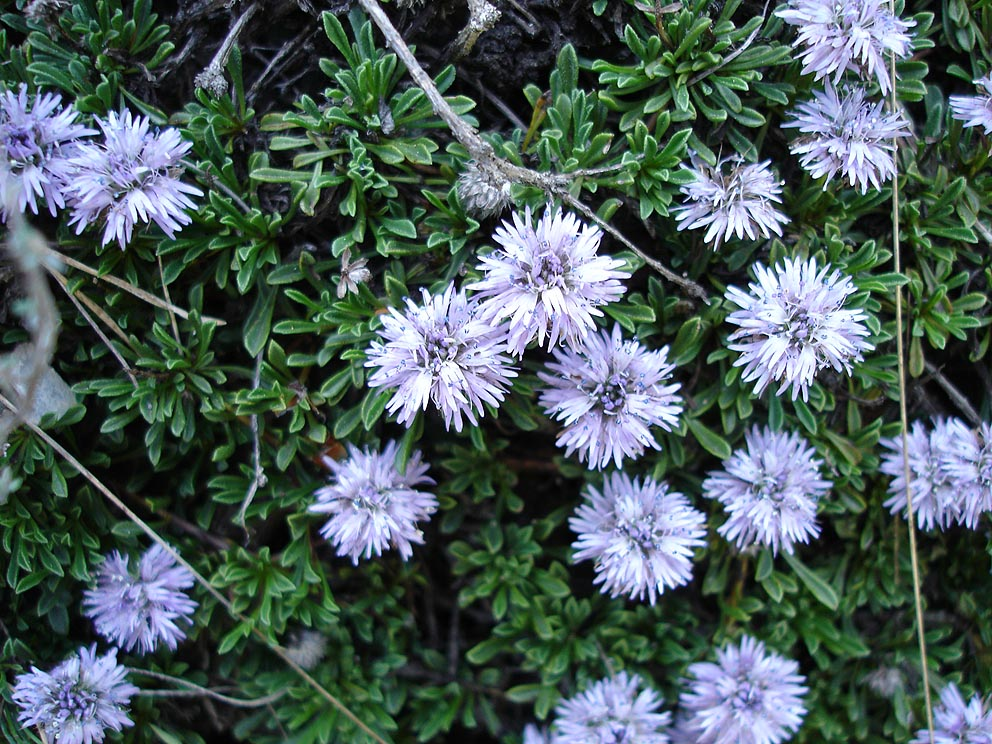
- Globularia repens

Scientific classification
- Kingdom: Plantae
- Clade: Embryophytes
- Clade: Tracheophytes
- Clade: Angiosperms
- Clade: Eudicots
- Clade: Asterids
- Order: Lamiales
- Family: Plantaginaceae
- Tribe: Globularieae
- Genus: Globularia; L.

Species
- See text

= Globularia =

Genus of flowering plants

Globularia is a genus of about 22 species of flowering plants in the family Plantaginaceae, native to central and southern Europe, Macaronesia, northwest Africa and southwest Asia. They are dense low evergreen mat-forming perennials or subshrubs, with leathery oval leaves 1–10 cm (0.4–3.9 in) long. The flowers are produced in dense inflorescences (capitula) held above the plant on a 1–30 cm (0.4–11.8 in) tall stem; the capitula is 1–3 cm in diameter, with numerous tightly packed purple, violet, pink or white flowers.

Globularia species are used as food plants by the larvae of some Lepidoptera species including Coleophora virgatella.

Several members of the genus, such as Globularia cordifolia and Globularia punctata, are cultivated and sold for garden use.

Under the old Cronquist system of plant classification, they were treated in their own family, Globulariaceae, but genetic evidence has shown that the genus belongs in the family Plantaginaceae.

Most species are known as globe daisies or globularias.

== Species ==
Species include:

- Globularia alypum
- Globularia amygdalifolia
- Globularia ascanii
- Globularia bisnagarica
- Globularia cordifolia
- Globularia dumulosa
- Globularia greuteri
- Globularia incanescens
- Globularia meridionalis
- Globularia nudicaulis
- Globularia orientalis
- Globularia repens
- Globularia salicina
- Globularia sarcophylla
- Globularia stygia
- Globularia trichosantha
- Globularia vulgaris
