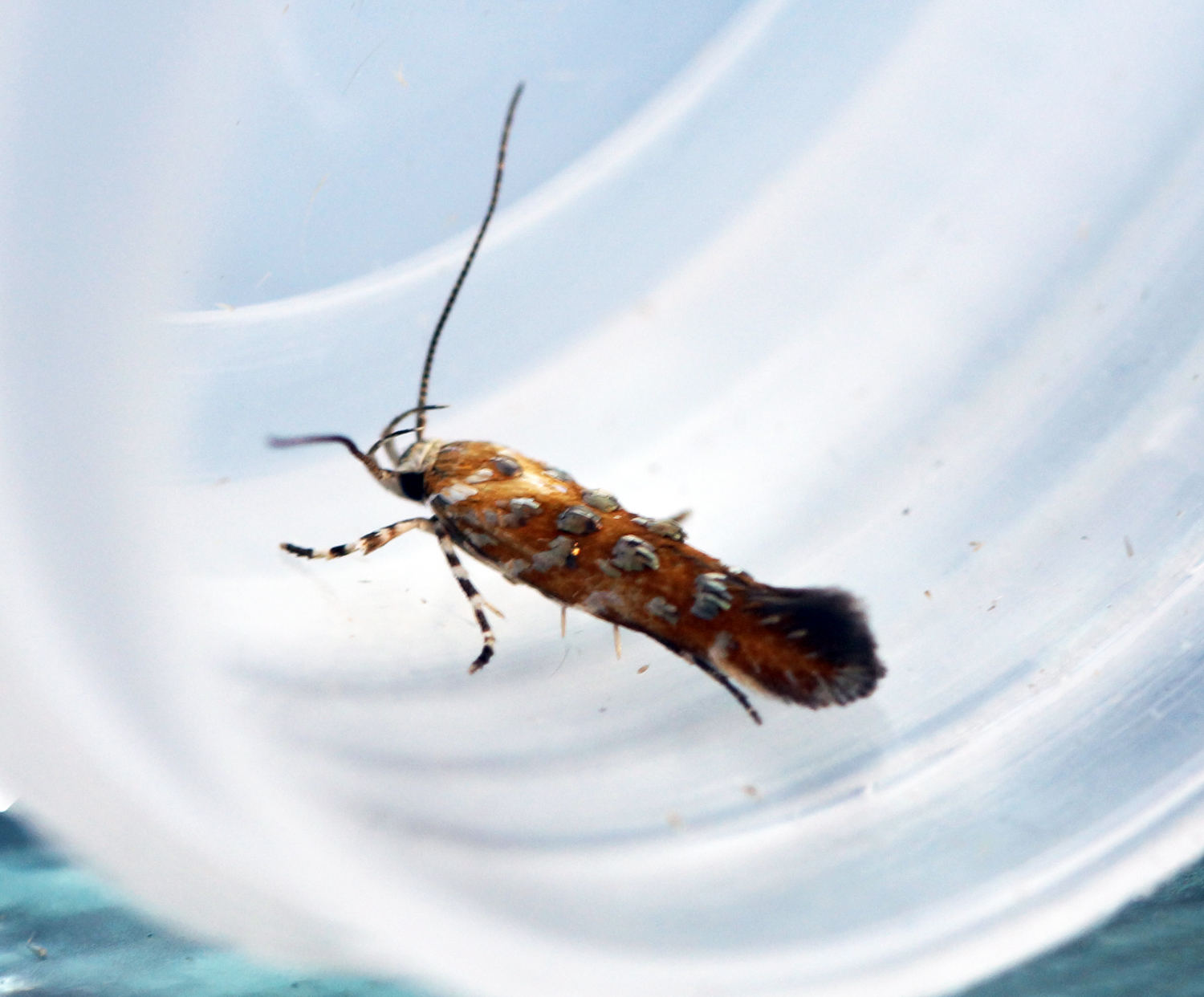

Scientific classification
- Kingdom: Animalia
- Phylum: Arthropoda
- Class: Insecta
- Order: Lepidoptera
- Family: Cosmopterigidae
- Genus: Eteobalea
- Species: E. isabellella

Binomial name
- Eteobalea isabellella (O. G. Costa, 1836)

Synonyms
- Ornix isabellella O. G. Costa, 1836; Eteobalea hisabellella; Stagmatophora opulentella Herrich-Schaffer, 1854; Stagmatophora rutilella Chretien, 1896

= Eteobalea isabellella =

Species of moth

Eteobalea isabellella is a moth in the family Cosmopterigidae. It is found in Spain, France, Italy, Corsica, the Balkan Peninsula, Turkey and North Africa.

The wingspan is about 14 mm. Adults are on wing from May to early October in two generations per year.
