= Eteobalea thaumatella =

Scientific classification
- Kingdom: Animalia
- Phylum: Arthropoda
- Clade: Pancrustacea
- Class: Insecta
- Order: Lepidoptera
- Family: Cosmopterigidae
- Genus: Eteobalea
- Species: E. thaumatella

Binomial name
- Eteobalea thaumatella (Walsingham, 1907)

Synonyms
- Stagmatophora thaumatella Walsingham, 1907; Stagmatophora lactipunctella Turati, 1924

Species of moth

Eteobalea thaumatella is a moth in the family Cosmopterigidae. It is found on Malta, the Canary Islands and from North Africa east to the Arabian Peninsula and Iran.

The wingspan is 8–15 mm. The forewings are dark shining bronzy fuscous, blending to brighter copper colour toward the dorsum. There are three conspicuous yellowish white costal patches. The hindwings are very pale bluish grey. Adults have been recorded from early March to early May and again in October and November.
