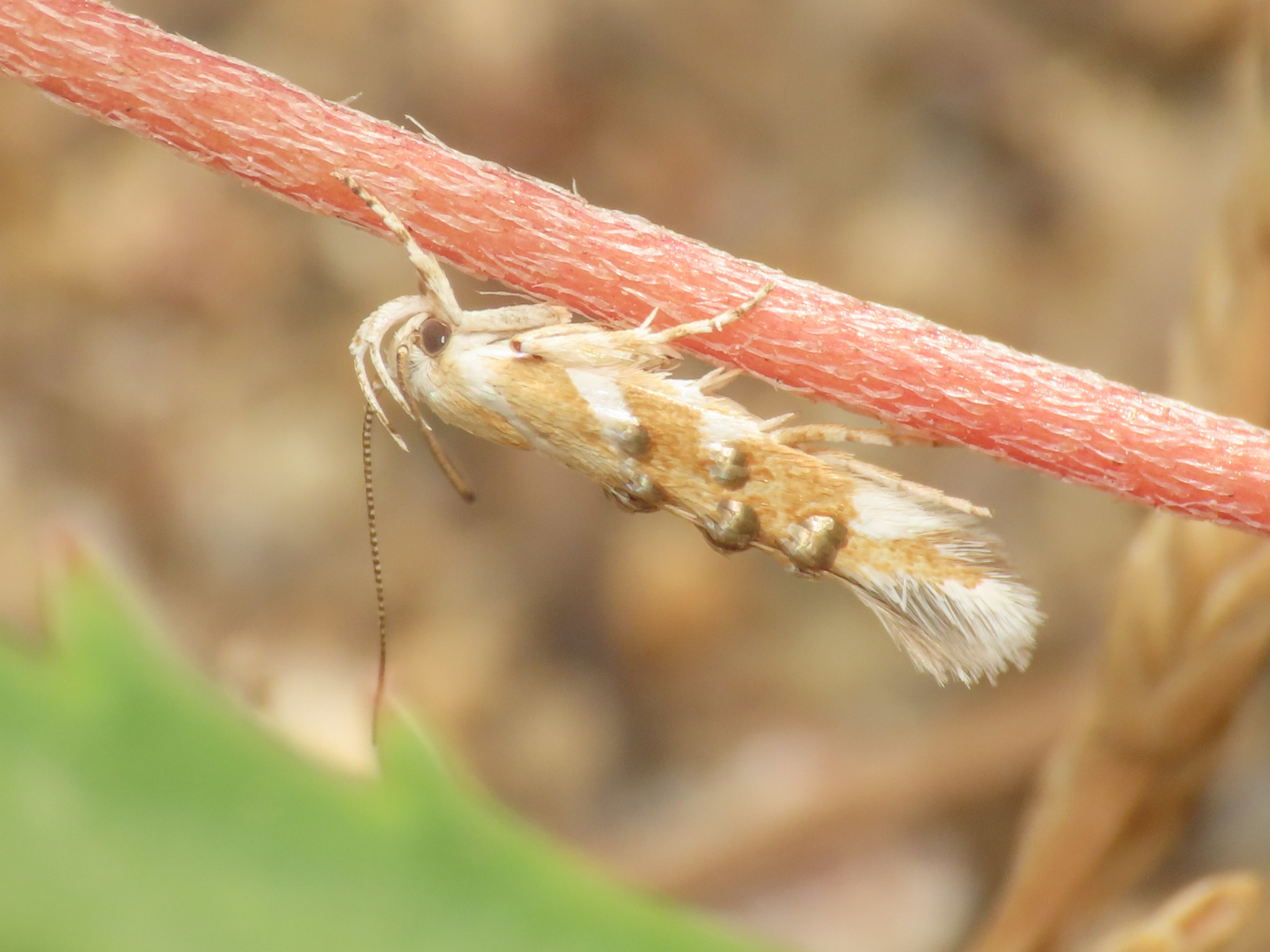

Scientific classification
- Kingdom: Animalia
- Phylum: Arthropoda
- Clade: Pancrustacea
- Class: Insecta
- Order: Lepidoptera
- Family: Cosmopterigidae
- Genus: Eteobalea
- Species: E. dohrnii

Binomial name
- Eteobalea dohrnii (Zeller, 1847)

Synonyms
- Elachista dohrnii Zeller, 1847; Eteobalea dohrni

= Eteobalea dohrnii =

Species of moth

Eteobalea dohrnii is a moth in the family Cosmopterigidae. It is found in France, Spain, Portugal, Italy, Sardinia, Corsica, Sicily, Malta, Croatia, Greece, Crete and Cyprus. In the east, the range extends to Syria.

The wingspan is 10–14 mm. Adults are on wing from May to early October in two generations per year.

The larvae feed on Plantago albicans and probably other Plantago species.
