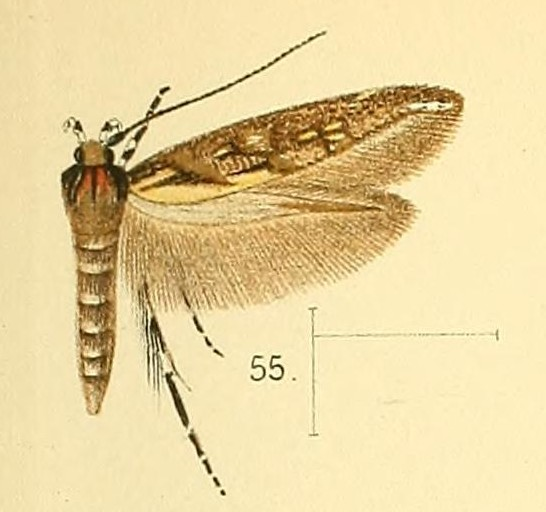

Scientific classification
- Domain: Eukaryota
- Kingdom: Animalia
- Phylum: Arthropoda
- Class: Insecta
- Order: Lepidoptera
- Family: Cosmopterigidae
- Genus: Eteobalea
- Species: E. quinquecristata

Binomial name
- Eteobalea quinquecristata (Walsingham, 1891)

Synonyms
- Laverna quinquecristata Walsingham, 1891

= Eteobalea quinquecristata =

Species of moth

Eteobalea quinquecristata is a moth in the family Cosmopterigidae. It is found in South Africa.
