= Eteobalea phanoptila =

Scientific classification
- Kingdom: Animalia
- Phylum: Arthropoda
- Class: Insecta
- Order: Lepidoptera
- Family: Cosmopterigidae
- Genus: Eteobalea
- Species: E. phanoptila

Binomial name
- Eteobalea phanoptila (Meyrick, 1911)

Synonyms
- Stagmatophora phanoptila Meyrick, 1911; Eteobalea planoptila

Species of moth

Eteobalea phanoptila is a moth in the family Cosmopterigidae. It is found in South Africa.
