= Eteobalea sumptuosella =

Scientific classification
- Kingdom: Animalia
- Phylum: Arthropoda
- Clade: Pancrustacea
- Class: Insecta
- Order: Lepidoptera
- Family: Cosmopterigidae
- Genus: Eteobalea
- Species: E. sumptuosella

Binomial name
- Eteobalea sumptuosella (Lederer, 1855)

Synonyms
- Elachista sumptuosella Lederer 1855; Lita admirandella Bruand, 1851 (nomen nudum); Stagmatophora amseli Osthelder, 1940

Species of moth

Eteobalea sumptuosella is a moth of the family Cosmopterigidae. It is found in the Mediterranean Region from Spain to Turkey, Morocco and Tunisia, Ukraine, southern Russia, the Caucasus, the Middle East, eastwards to Kazakhstan, Turkmenistan and Afghanistan.

The wingspan is 13–20 millimetres (0.51–0.79 in). Adults are on the wing from early June to end of August.
