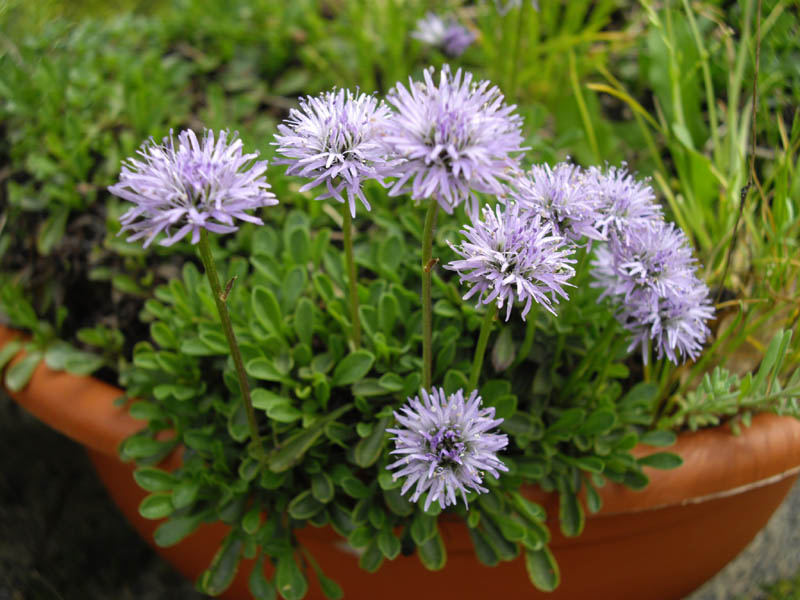

Scientific classification
- Kingdom: Plantae
- Clade: Tracheophytes
- Clade: Angiosperms
- Clade: Eudicots
- Clade: Asterids
- Order: Lamiales
- Family: Plantaginaceae
- Genus: Globularia
- Species: G. meridionalis

Binomial name
- Globularia meridionalis (Podp.) O.Schwarz

Synonyms
- Globularia bellidifolia

= Globularia meridionalis =

Species of flowering plant

Globularia meridionalis is a plant species in the family Plantaginaceae. It is a perennial plant and is found in the Balkans and Italy. It has a dark evergreen foliage and bright blue spherical flowerheads.

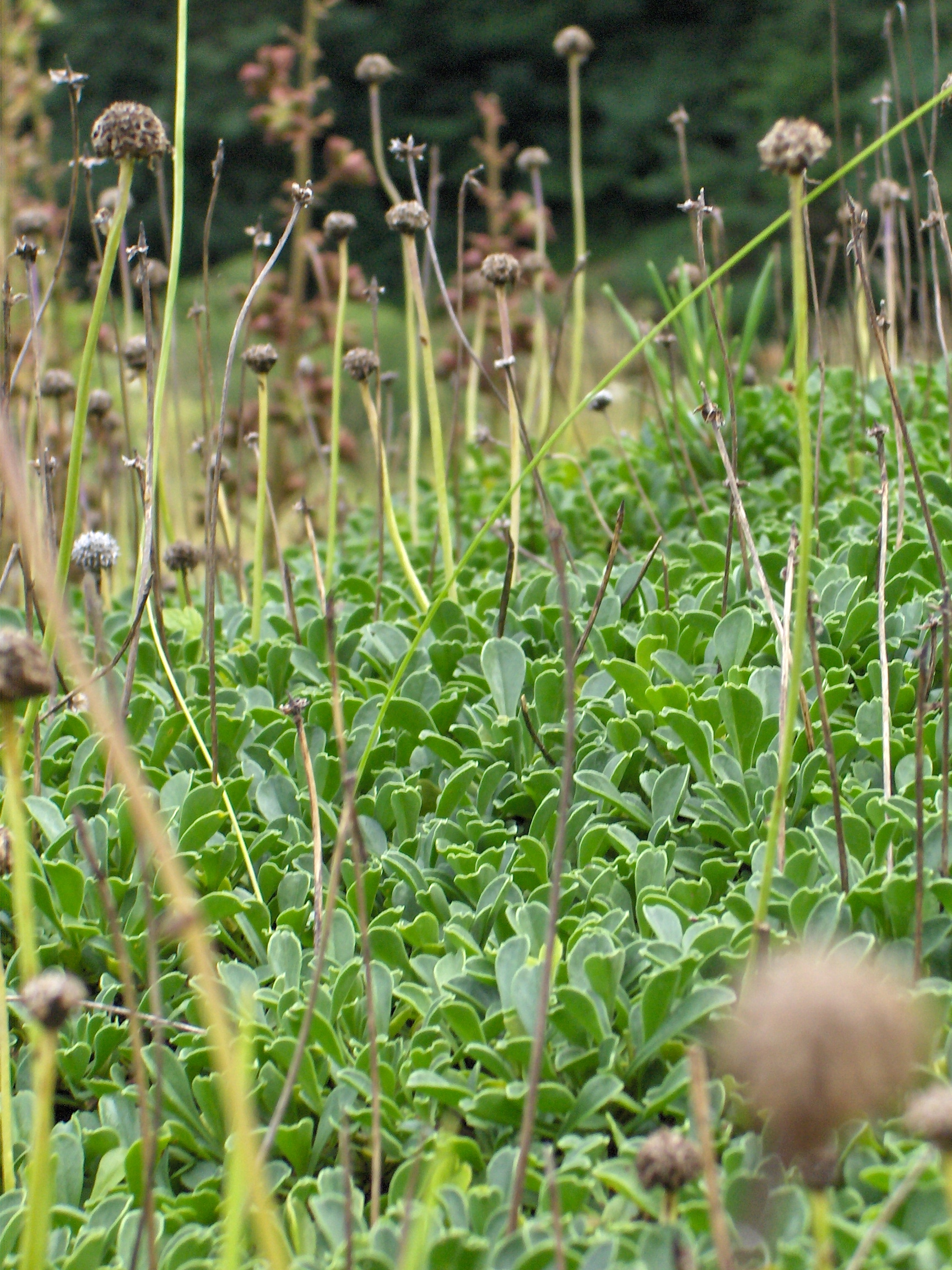
Foliage and seedheads
