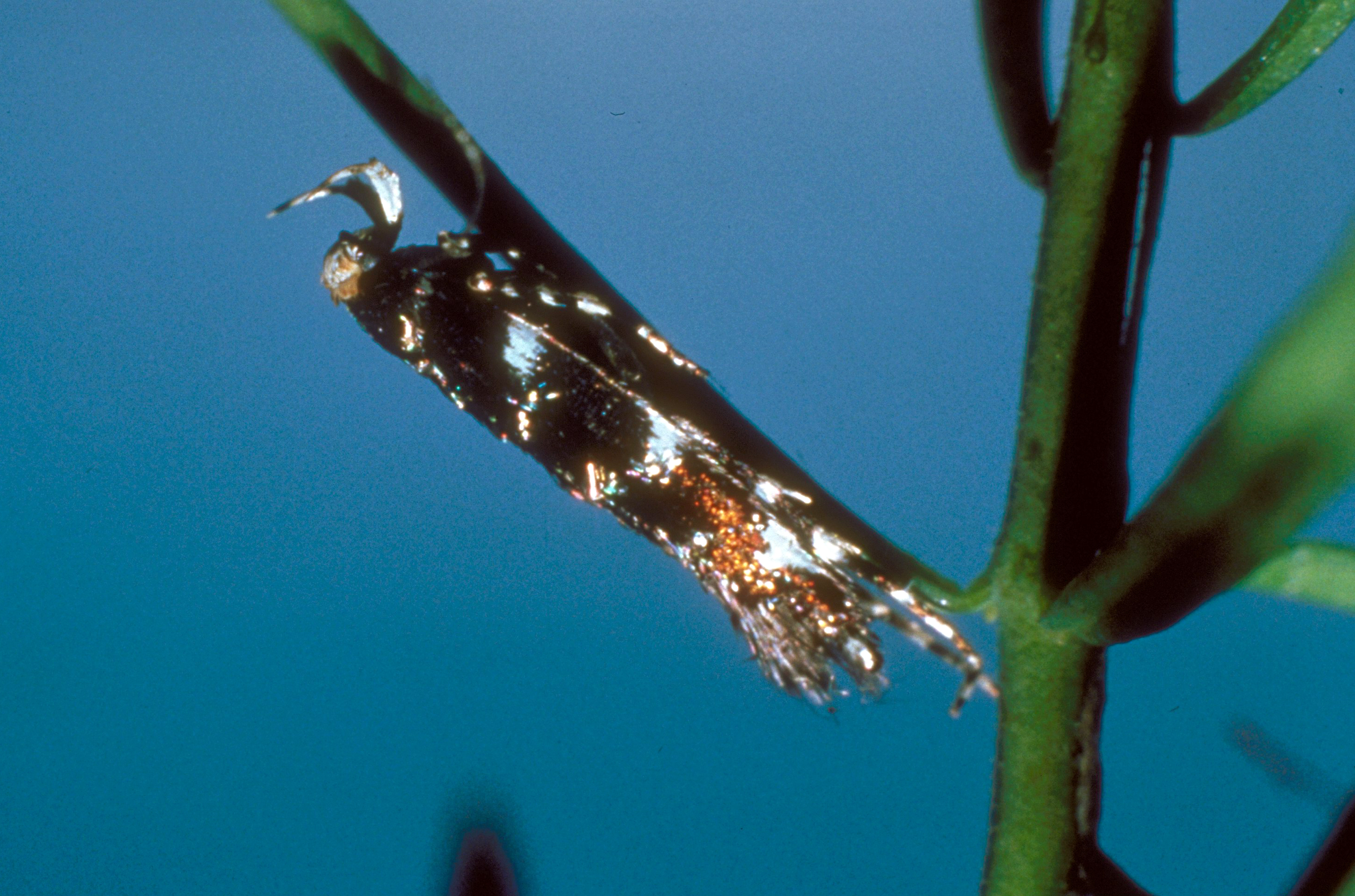
- Eteobalea intermediella

Scientific classification
- Kingdom: Animalia
- Phylum: Arthropoda
- Clade: Pancrustacea
- Class: Insecta
- Order: Lepidoptera
- Family: Cosmopterigidae
- Subfamily: Cosmopteriginae
- Genus: Eteobalea; Hodges, 1962

Synonyms
- Parastagmatophora Riedl, 1965

= Eteobalea =

Genus of moths

Eteobalea is a genus of moths in the family Cosmopterigidae. It is treated as a synonym of Stagmatophora by some authors.

== Species ==
- Eteobalea aglaopa (Meyrick, 1928)
- Eteobalea albiapicella (Duponchel, 1843)
- Eteobalea alypella (Klimesch, 1946)
- Eteobalea anonymella (Riedl, 1965)
- Eteobalea beata (Walsingham, 1907)
- Eteobalea dohrnii (Zeller, 1847)
- Eteobalea enchrysa Hodges, 1962
- Eteobalea eurinella Sinev, 1986
- Eteobalea intermediella Riedl, 1966
- Eteobalea iridella (Busck, 1907)
- Eteobalea isabellella (O. Costa, 1836)
- Eteobalea klisieckii (Riedl, 1966)
- Eteobalea pentagama Meyrick, 1928
- Eteobalea phanoptila Meyrick, 1911 (or Eteobalea planoptila)
- Eteobalea quinquecristata (Walsingham, 1891)
- Eteobalea serratella (Treitschke, 1833)
- Eteobalea sexnotella (Chambers, 1878)
- Eteobalea siciliae (Riedl, 1966)
- Eteobalea sumptuosella (Lederer, 1855)
- Eteobalea teucrii (Walsingham, 1907)
- Eteobalea thaumatella (Walsingham, 1907)
- Eteobalea tririvella (Staudinger, 1871)
- Eteobalea vinsoni (Viette, 1953)
  - Eteobalea vinsoni vinsoni
  - Eteobalea vinsoni abcedella (Viette, 1957)
