= Eteobalea tririvella =

Scientific classification
- Domain: Eukaryota
- Kingdom: Animalia
- Phylum: Arthropoda
- Class: Insecta
- Order: Lepidoptera
- Family: Cosmopterigidae
- Genus: Eteobalea
- Species: E. tririvella

Binomial name
- Eteobalea tririvella (Staudinger, 1870)

Synonyms
- Stagmatophora tririvella Staudinger, 1870; Stagmatophora tririvella bernhardiella Kasy, 1973; Stagmatophora kasyi Riedl, 1965

Species of moth

Eteobalea tririvella is a moth in the family Cosmopterigidae. It is found in France, Italy, Austria, the Czech Republic, Slovakia, Hungary, Croatia, Romania, Moldova, Ukraine, Russia, Mongolia, Latvia, Estonia, Finland and Sweden.

The wingspan is 11–17 mm. The forewings are black with three shining golden lines and an apical patch. The hindwings are greyish black. Adults are on wing from mid-June to the end of August.

The larvae possibly feed on Thymus species.
