= Eteobalea eurinella =

Scientific classification
- Kingdom: Animalia
- Phylum: Arthropoda
- Clade: Pancrustacea
- Class: Insecta
- Order: Lepidoptera
- Family: Cosmopterigidae
- Genus: Eteobalea
- Species: E. eurinella

Binomial name
- Eteobalea eurinella Sinev, 1986

Species of moth

Eteobalea eurinella is a moth in the family Cosmopterigidae. It is found in Russia (Primorye).
