= Eteobalea iridella =

Scientific classification
- Domain: Eukaryota
- Kingdom: Animalia
- Phylum: Arthropoda
- Class: Insecta
- Order: Lepidoptera
- Family: Cosmopterigidae
- Genus: Eteobalea
- Species: E. iridella

Binomial name
- Eteobalea iridella (Busck, 1907)

Synonyms
- Mompha iridella Busck, 1907; Stagmatophora iridella; Stagmatophora niphochrysa Meyrick, 1930

Species of moth

Eteobalea iridella is a moth in the family Cosmopterigidae. It is found in North America, where it has been recorded from Texas, Washington and California.

The wingspan is 11 mm. Adults have been recorded on wing from February to October.
