= Eteobalea teucrii =

Scientific classification
- Domain: Eukaryota
- Kingdom: Animalia
- Phylum: Arthropoda
- Class: Insecta
- Order: Lepidoptera
- Family: Cosmopterigidae
- Genus: Eteobalea
- Species: E. teucrii

Binomial name
- Eteobalea teucrii (Walsingham, 1907)

Synonyms
- Stagmatophora teucrii Walsingham, 1907

Species of moth

Eteobalea teucrii is a moth in the family Cosmopterigidae. It is found in Spain and Morocco. Moths in this family are often referred to as "cosmet moths" due to their small size and beautiful patterns on their wings.

The wingspan is about 22 mm. The forewings are bronzy black with three white dorsal patches. The hindwings are shining, leaden grey. Adults are on wing from September to the beginning of October.

The larvae form galls on Teucrium fruticans. They are white without markings and a black head. They reach a length of about 11 mm.
