= Nothris leuca =

Scientific classification
- Kingdom: Animalia
- Phylum: Arthropoda
- Class: Insecta
- Order: Lepidoptera
- Family: Gelechiidae
- Genus: Nothris
- Species: N. leuca

Binomial name
- Nothris leuca Filipjev, 1928

Species of moth

Nothris leuca is a moth in the family Gelechiidae. It was described by Filipjev in 1928. It is found in Mongolia.
