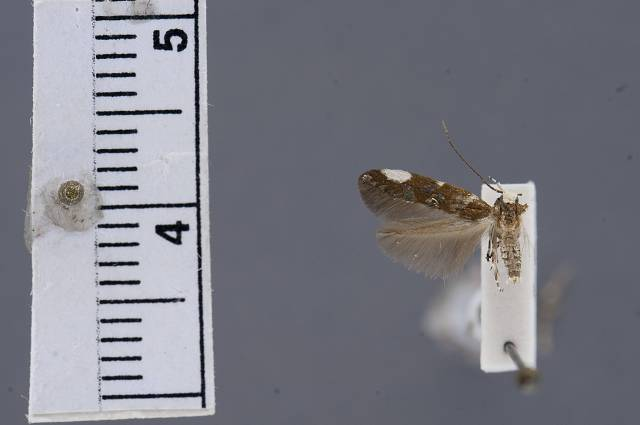
- Holotype of Eteobalea enchrysa, male

Scientific classification
- Domain: Eukaryota
- Kingdom: Animalia
- Phylum: Arthropoda
- Class: Insecta
- Order: Lepidoptera
- Family: Cosmopterigidae
- Genus: Eteobalea
- Species: E. enchrysa

Binomial name
- Eteobalea enchrysa Hodges, 1962

Synonyms
- Stagmatophora enchrysa

= Eteobalea enchrysa =

Species of moth

Eteobalea enchrysa is a moth in the family Cosmopterigidae. It is found in North America, where it has been recorded from California.

Adults have been recorded on wing from April to June.

The larvae feed on Trichostema lanatum. Larval feeding causes stem galls.
