= Eteobalea klisieckii =

Scientific classification
- Domain: Eukaryota
- Kingdom: Animalia
- Phylum: Arthropoda
- Class: Insecta
- Order: Lepidoptera
- Family: Cosmopterigidae
- Genus: Eteobalea
- Species: E. klisieckii

Binomial name
- Eteobalea klisieckii (Riedl, 1966)

Synonyms
- Stagmatophora klisieckii Riedl, 1966

Species of moth

Eteobalea klisieckii is a moth in the family Cosmopterigidae. It is found in Morocco.

The wingspan is about 25 mm.
