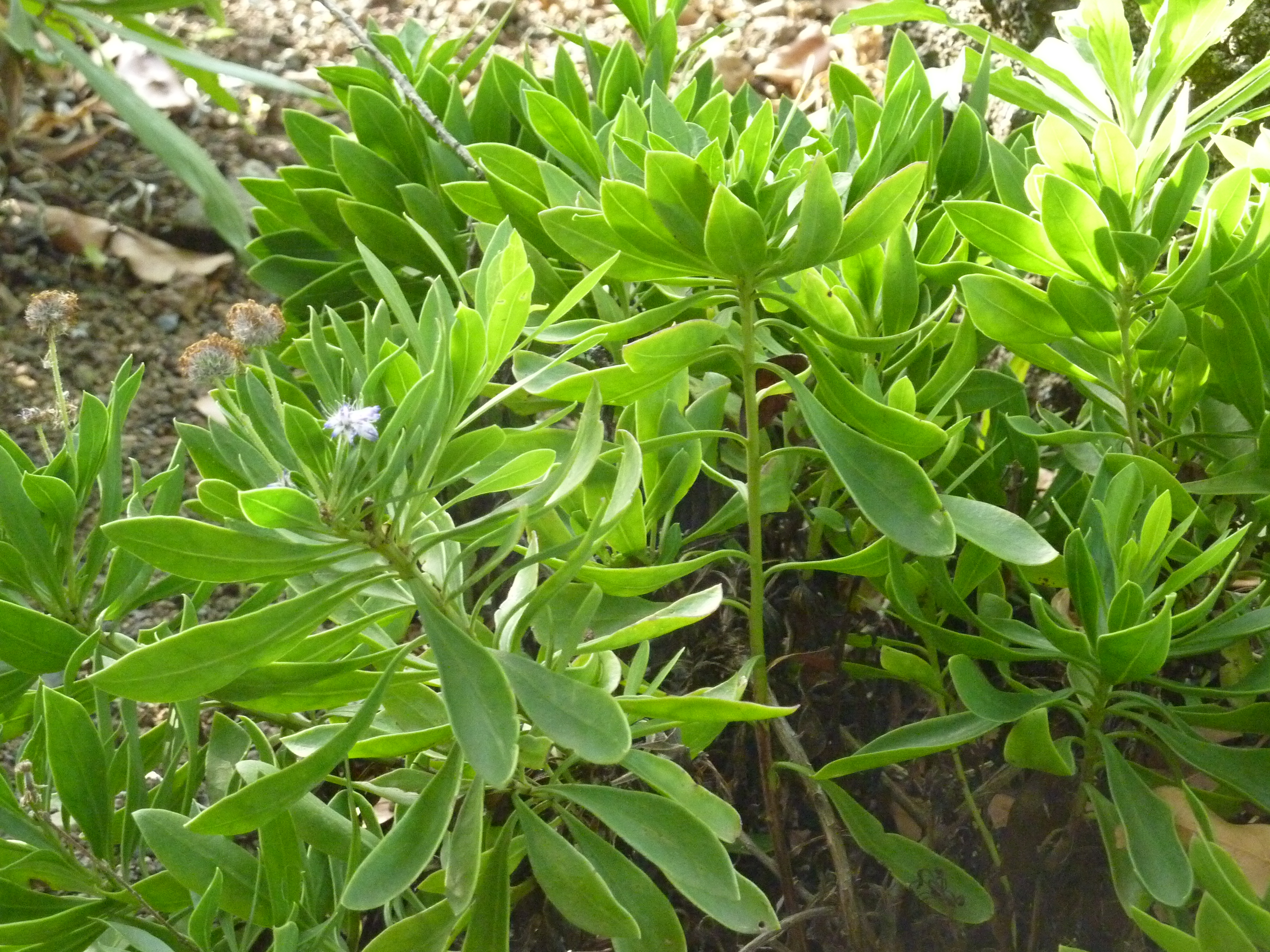

Conservation status
- Vulnerable (IUCN 3.1)

Scientific classification
- Kingdom: Plantae
- Clade: Tracheophytes
- Clade: Angiosperms
- Clade: Eudicots
- Clade: Asterids
- Order: Lamiales
- Family: Plantaginaceae
- Genus: Globularia
- Species: G. sarcophylla

Binomial name
- Globularia sarcophylla Svent.

= Globularia sarcophylla =

Species of flowering plant

Globularia sarcophylla is a plant endemic to Gran Canaria, where it is rare and confined to basalt mountain cliffs of the Caldera de Tirajana, Los Leales, La Culata etc. around 1,600 m (5,200 ft) in elevation. Its leaves small, obovate, fleshy, about 2 cm (0.79 in) long. The flowers are blue. Flower heads are solitary about 1.5 cm (0.59 in) across, on 5–6 cm (2.0–2.4 in) long terminal peduncles.
