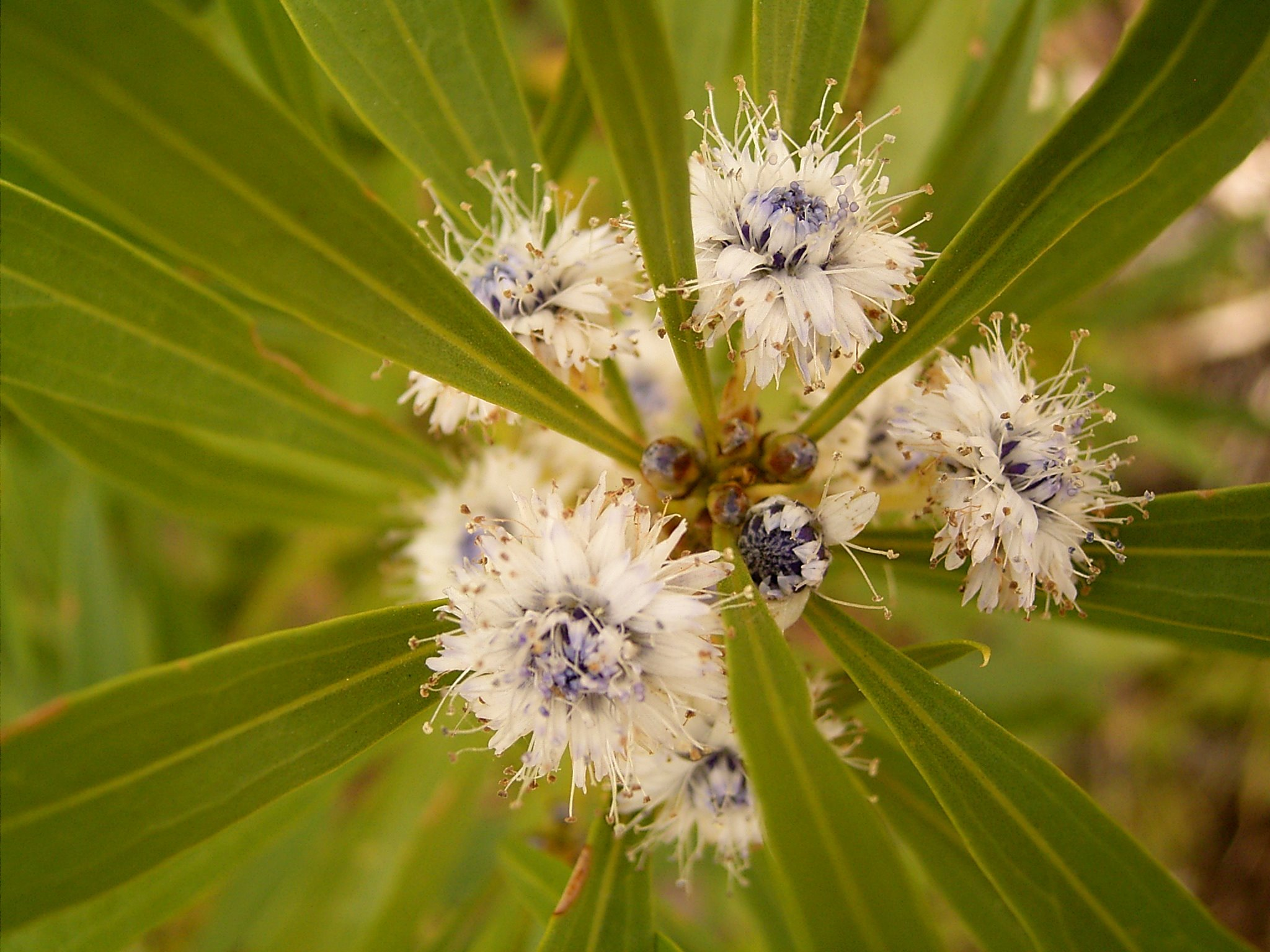

Scientific classification
- Kingdom: Plantae
- Clade: Tracheophytes
- Clade: Angiosperms
- Clade: Eudicots
- Clade: Asterids
- Order: Lamiales
- Family: Plantaginaceae
- Genus: Globularia
- Species: G. salicina

Binomial name
- Globularia salicina Lam.

= Globularia salicina =

Species of flowering plant

Globularia salicina is a shrub native to the archipelago of Madeira and to the central and western Canary Islands.

== Description ==
Upright shrub up to 2 m high with slender branches. Leaves 3.5-7 x 0.5–3 cm, alternate, narrowly to broadly lanceolate, entire, glabrous, acute, attenuate at the base, upright, evergreen. Inflorescences in dense globular heads with tomentose to glabrescent ovate axillary bracts, with densely long ciliate margins. Heads often less than 1.5 cm across, usually crowded towards the tips of the stems, pale powder blue or whitish, hermaphrodite and zygomorphic. Calyx tubular, deeply 5-lobed, lobes linear, margins ciliate. Corolla 4 mm long with a slender tube, 2-lipped, the upper lip almost absent, the lower with 3 long lobes. Stamens exserted 4, style exserted, stigma bilobed. Fruit a small 1-seeded nut 1 mm, dark brown.

== Distribution ==
Common in Madeira on hillsides, cliffs, slopes, among rocks, and rough grassland. Found mostly below 300 m, rarely above 400 m in the north, but up to 700 m in the south. Rare in Porto Santo and also known from Deserta Grande.

Rare on Gran Canaria, but common on southern slopes in Tenerife and on northern coastal region of La Gomera. It is also found in El Hierro and in the north eastern region of La Palma.

== Gallery ==
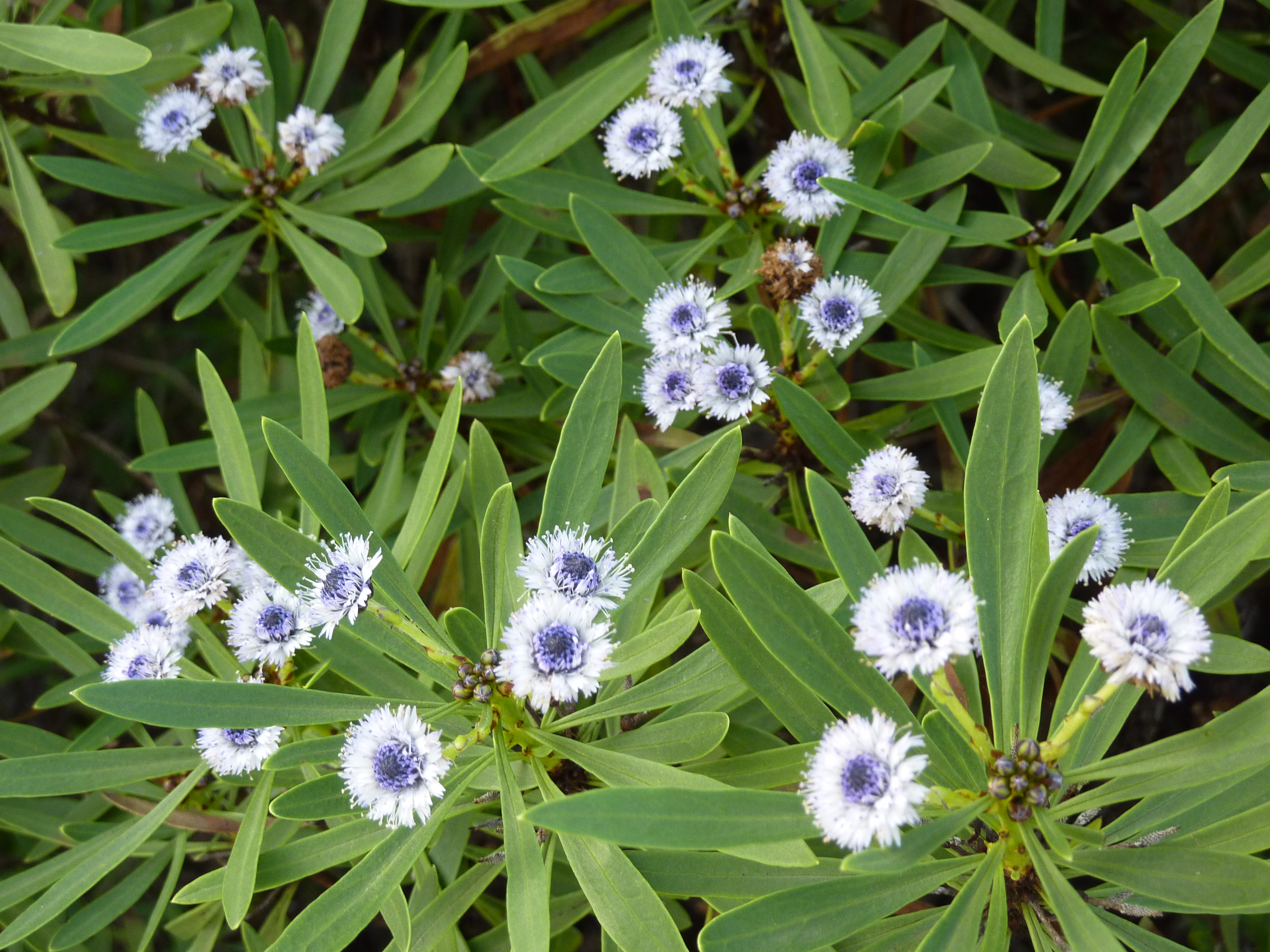
Globularia salicina (Jardín Botánico Canario Viera y Clavijo)

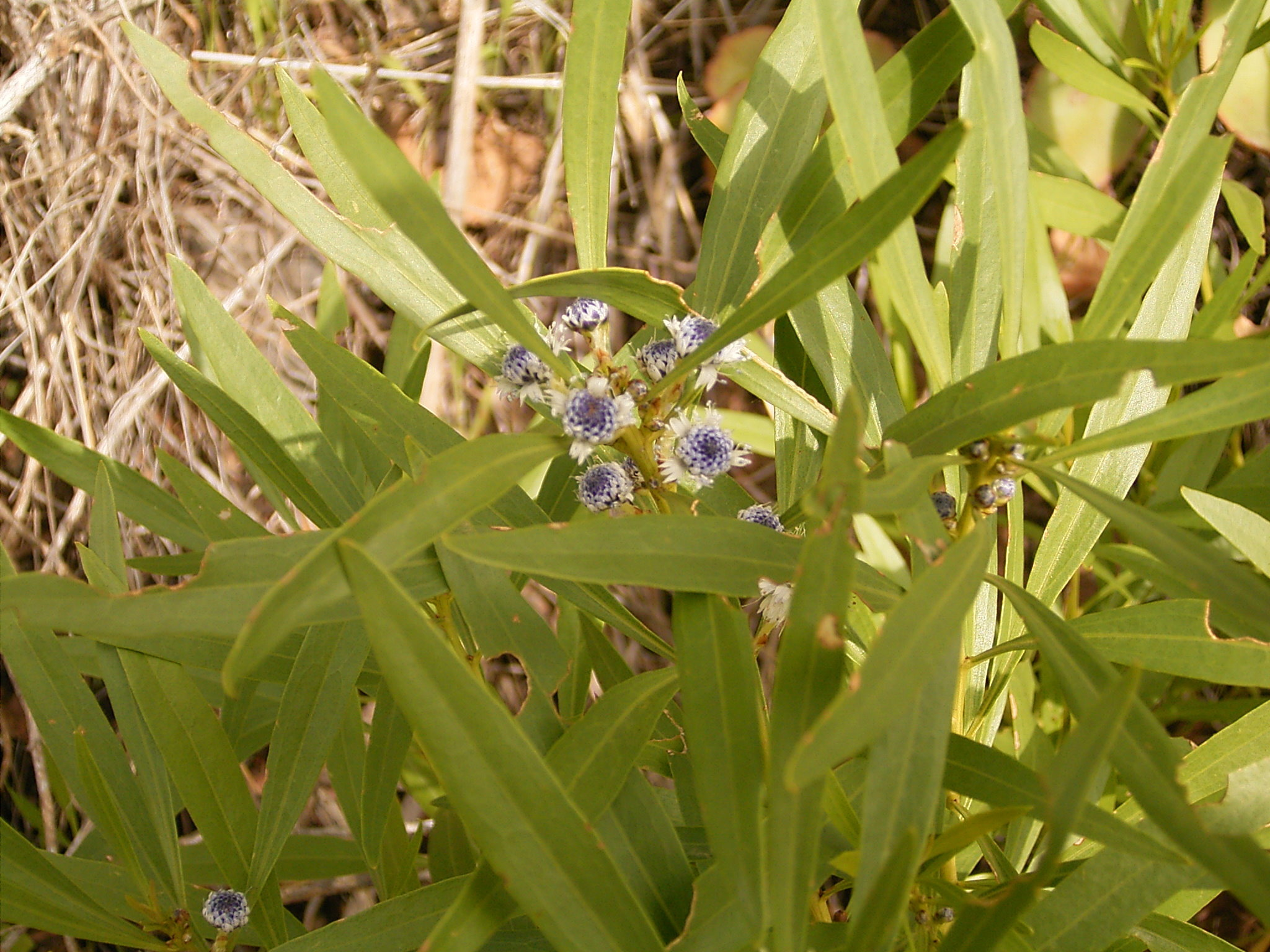
Globularia salicina (Puntallana)

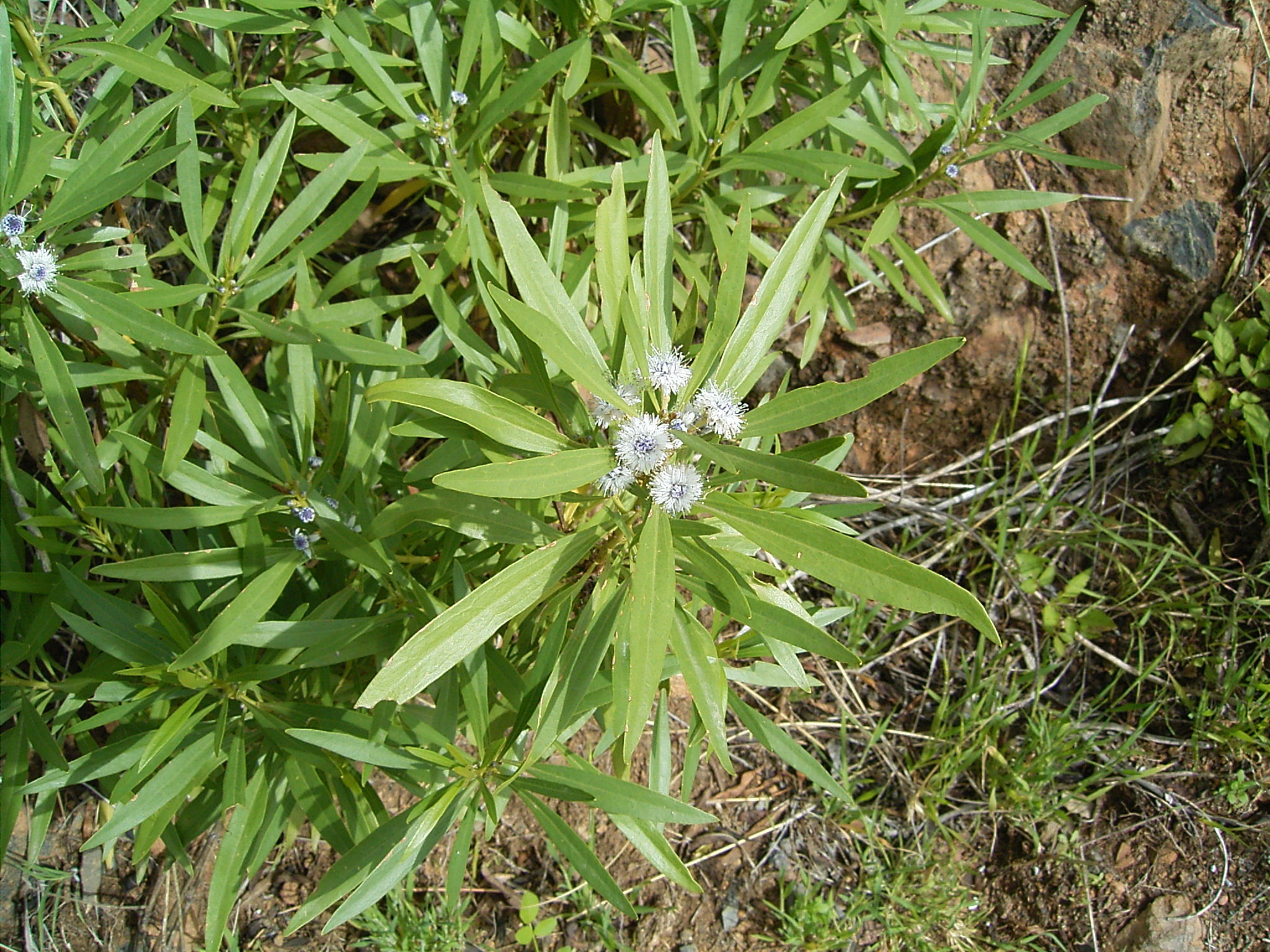
Globularia salicina (Puntallana)

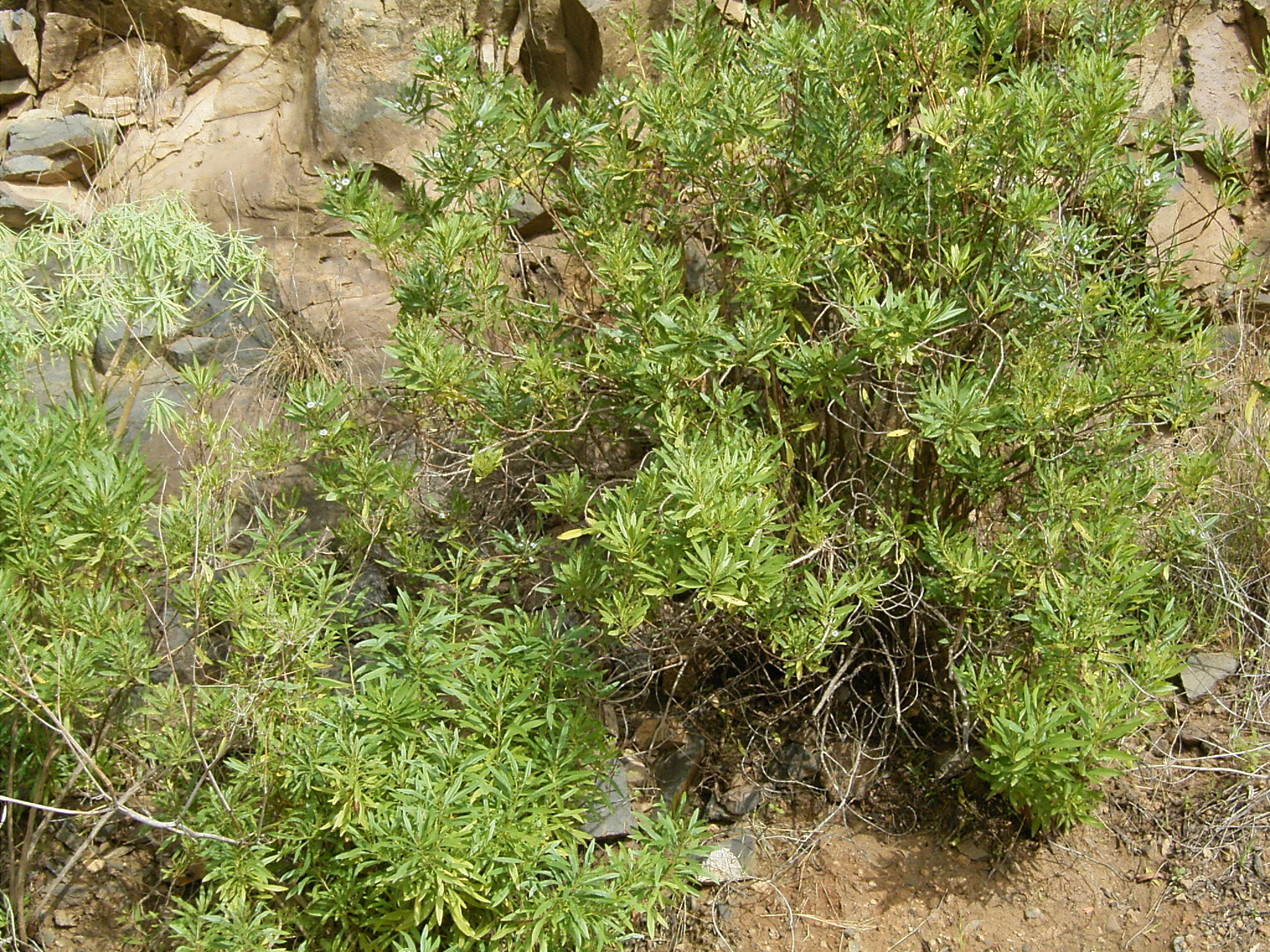
Globularia salicina (Puntallana)

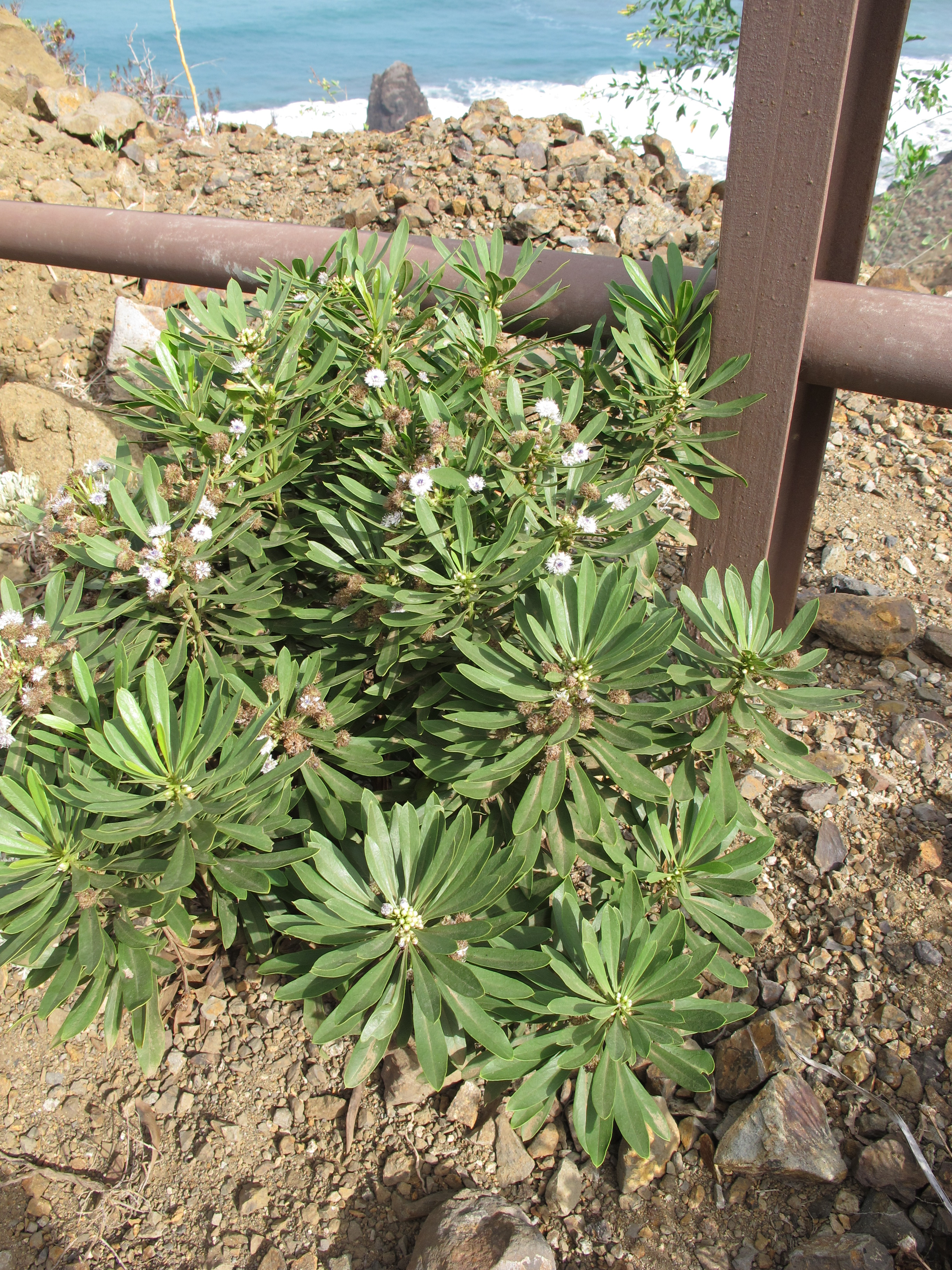
Globularia salicina

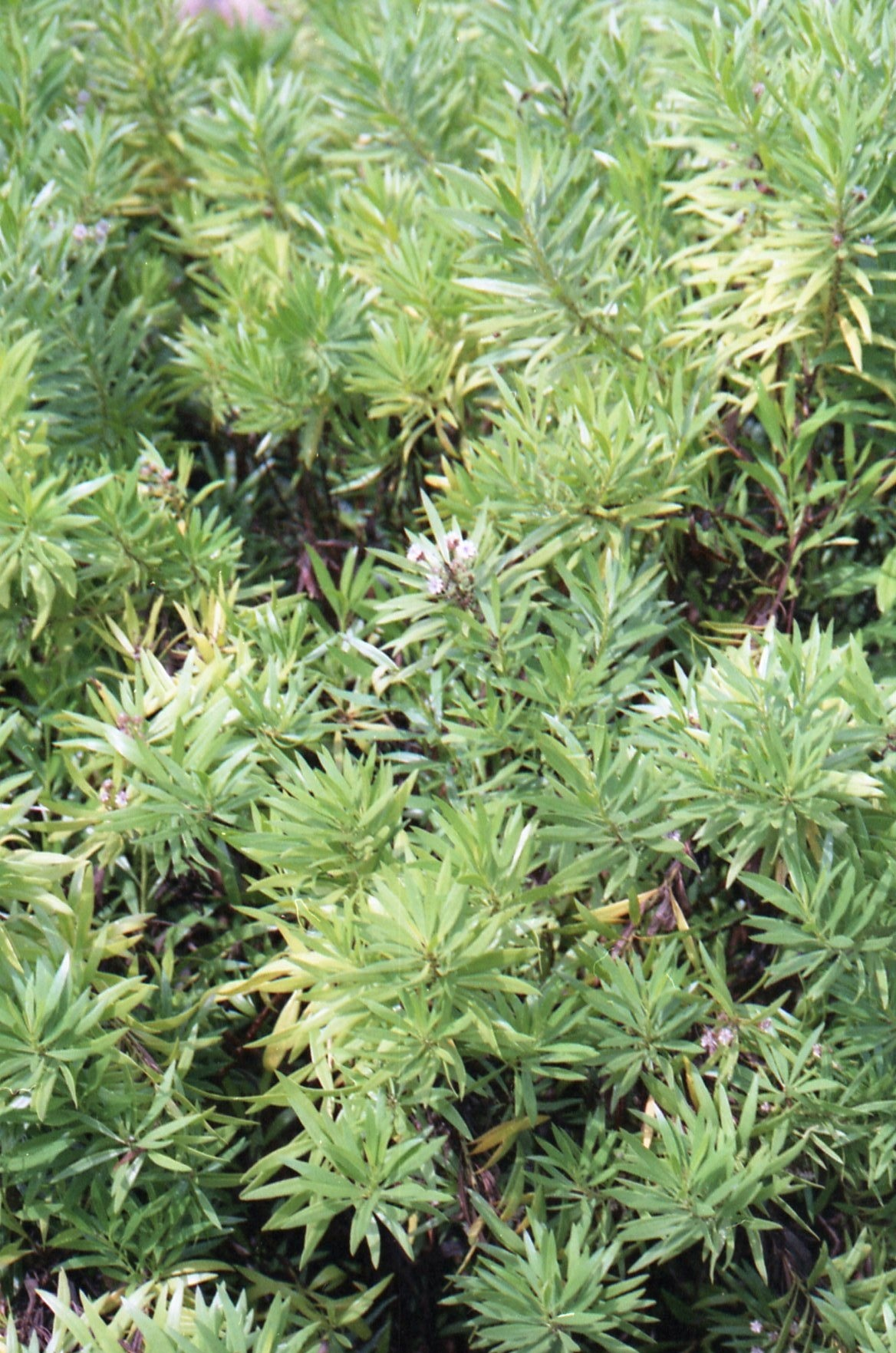
In Madeira
