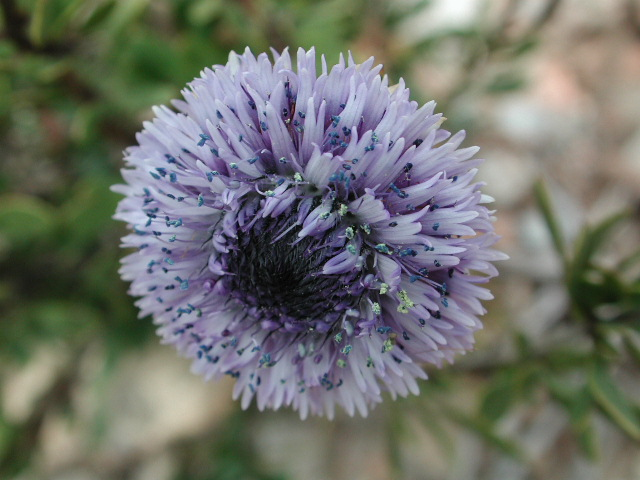
- Close-up of flower
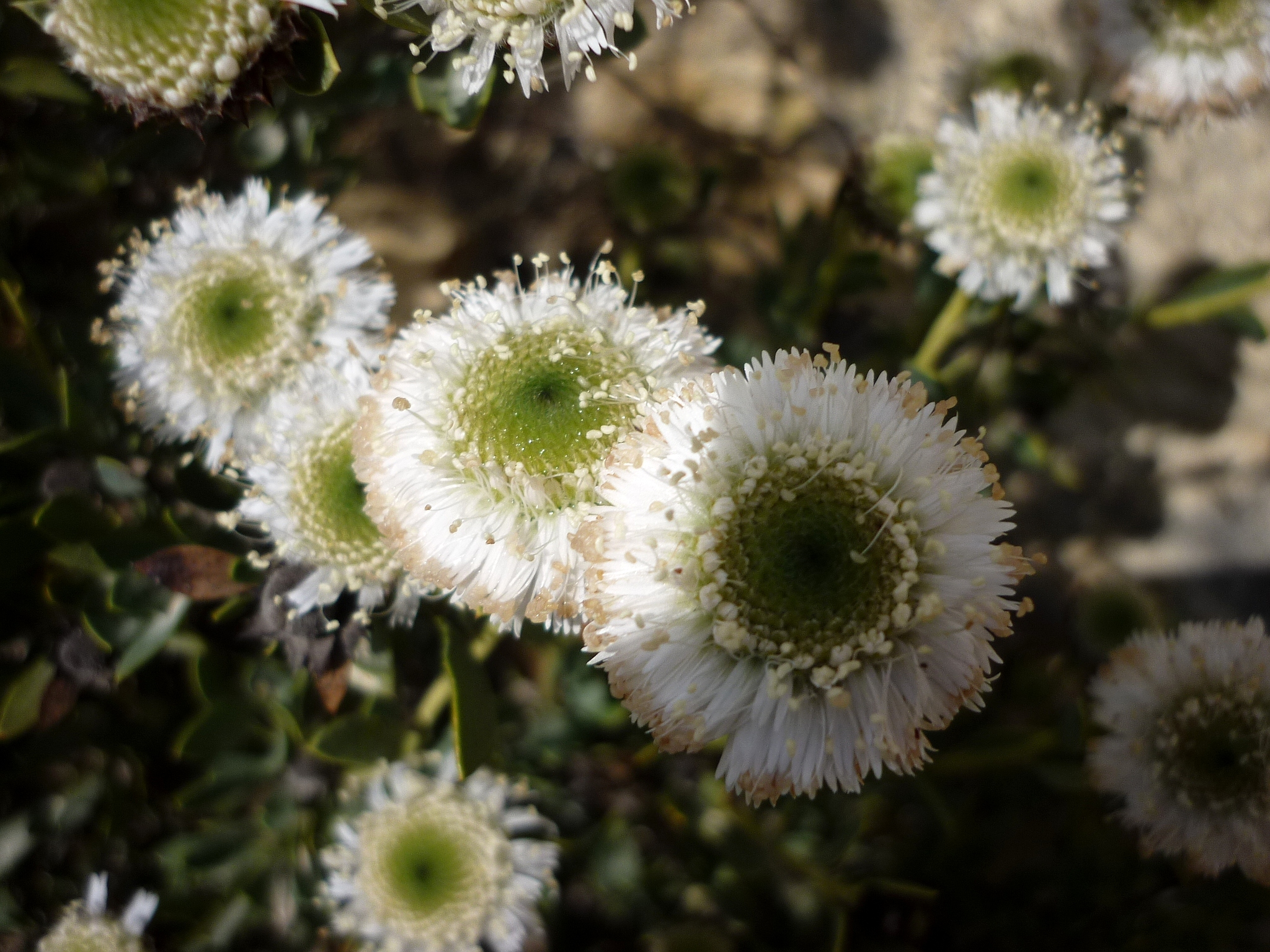
- A white-flowered individual

Scientific classification
- Kingdom: Plantae
- Clade: Tracheophytes
- Clade: Angiosperms
- Clade: Eudicots
- Clade: Asterids
- Order: Lamiales
- Family: Plantaginaceae
- Genus: Globularia
- Species: G. alypum

Binomial name
- Globularia alypum L.

Synonyms
- Alypum monspeliensium Fourr.; Alypum salicifolium Fisch.; Globularia alypa St.-Lag.; Globularia alypum var. pycnantha Sennen & Pau; Globularia turbith Willk.; Globularia virgata Salisb.

= Globularia alypum =

Species of plant

Globularia alypum, the Alypo globe daisy or shrubby globularia, is a species of flowering plant in the family Plantaginaceae, with a Mediterranean distribution. A shrub that is often co-dominant in the calcareous shrublands in which it occurs, it is used as a purgative.

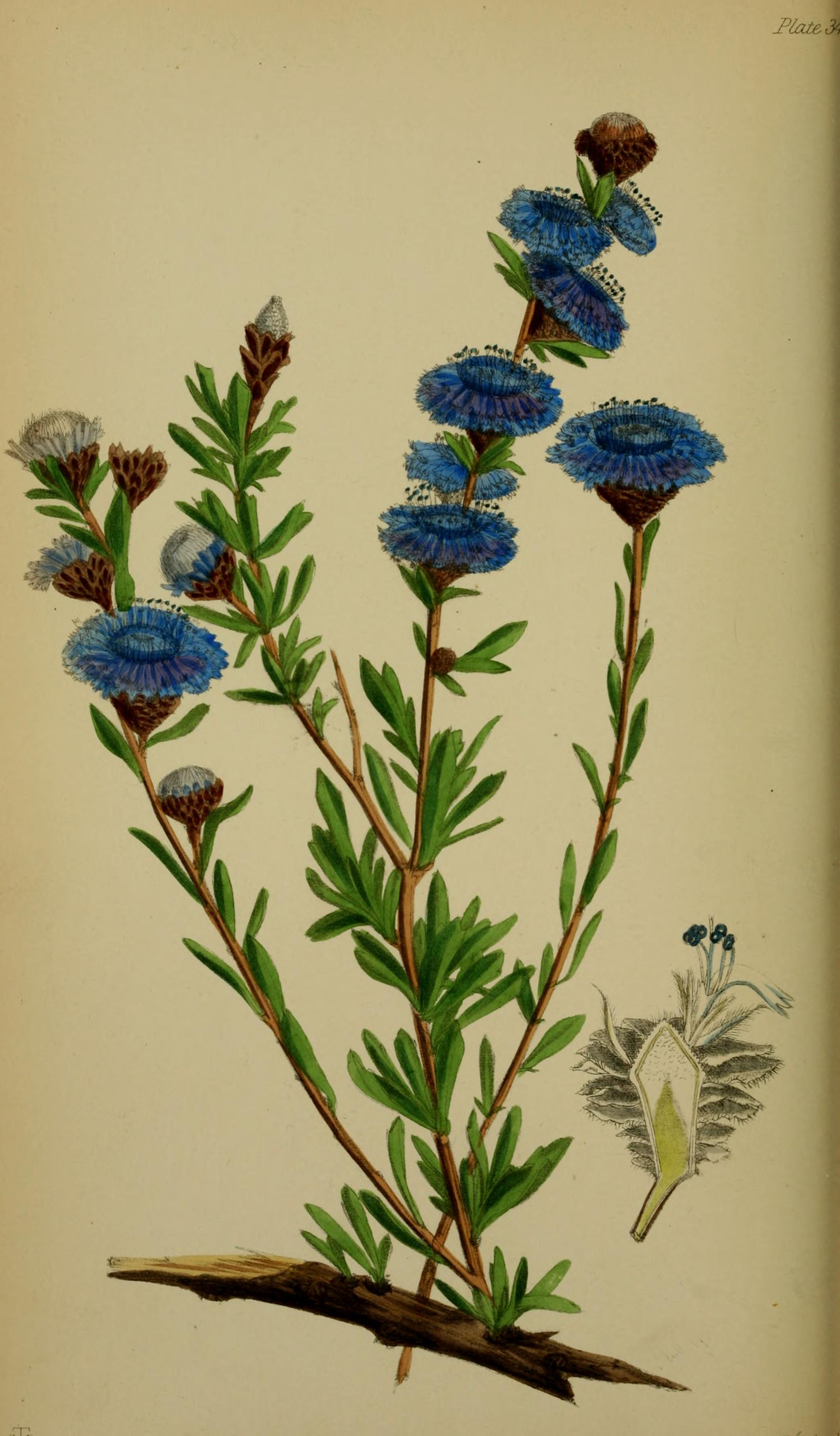
Botanical illustration

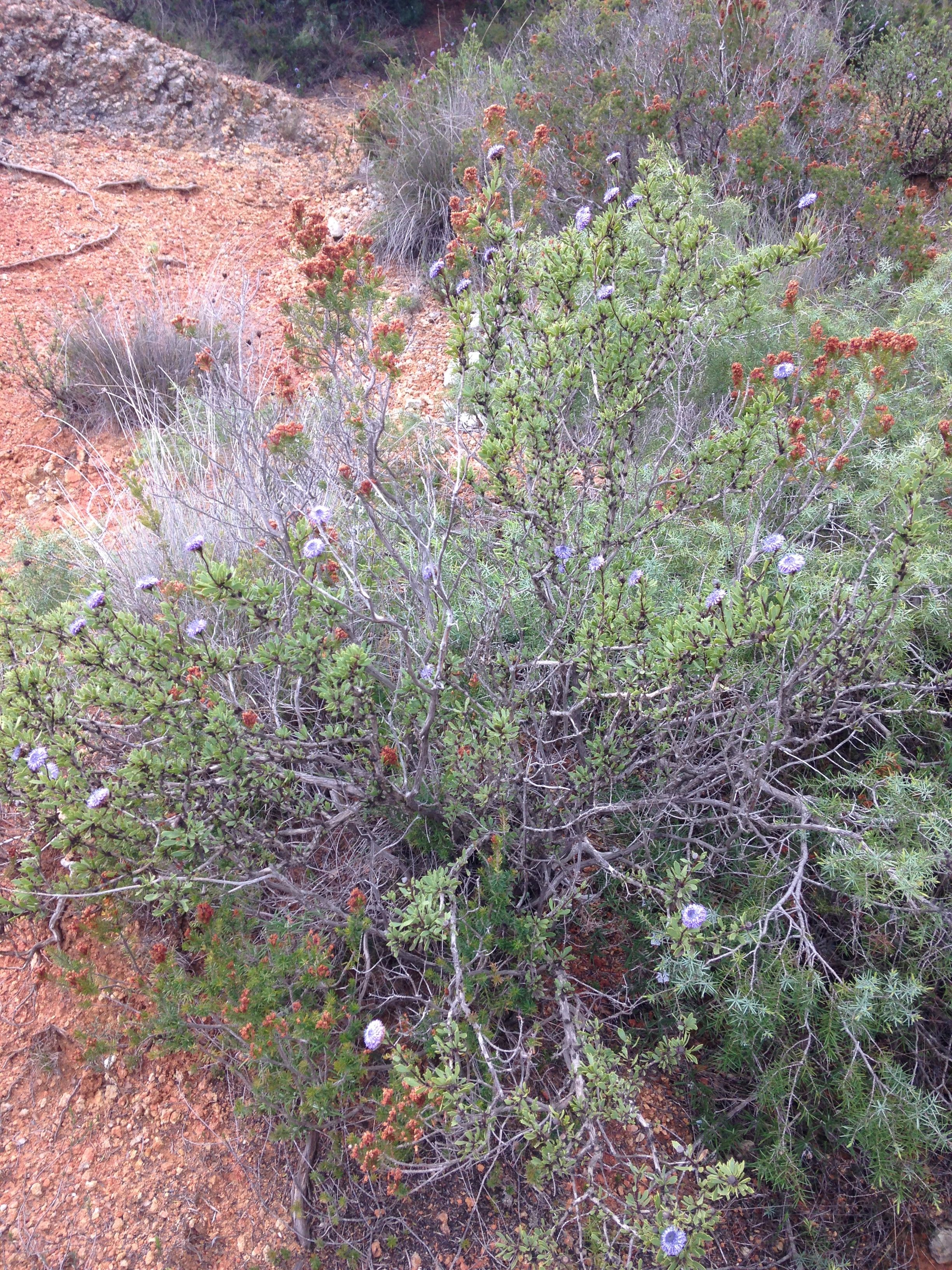
Habit

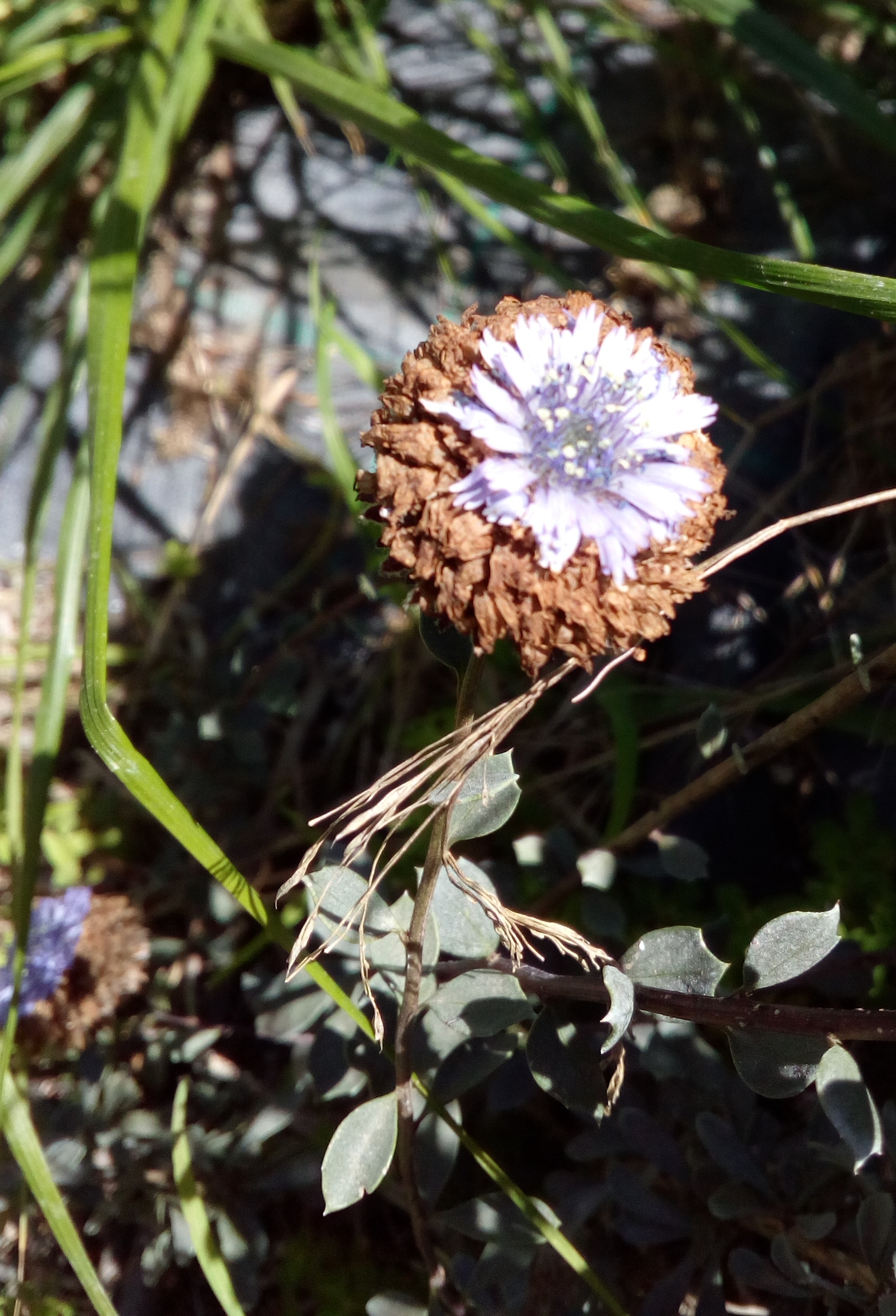
Spent flower
