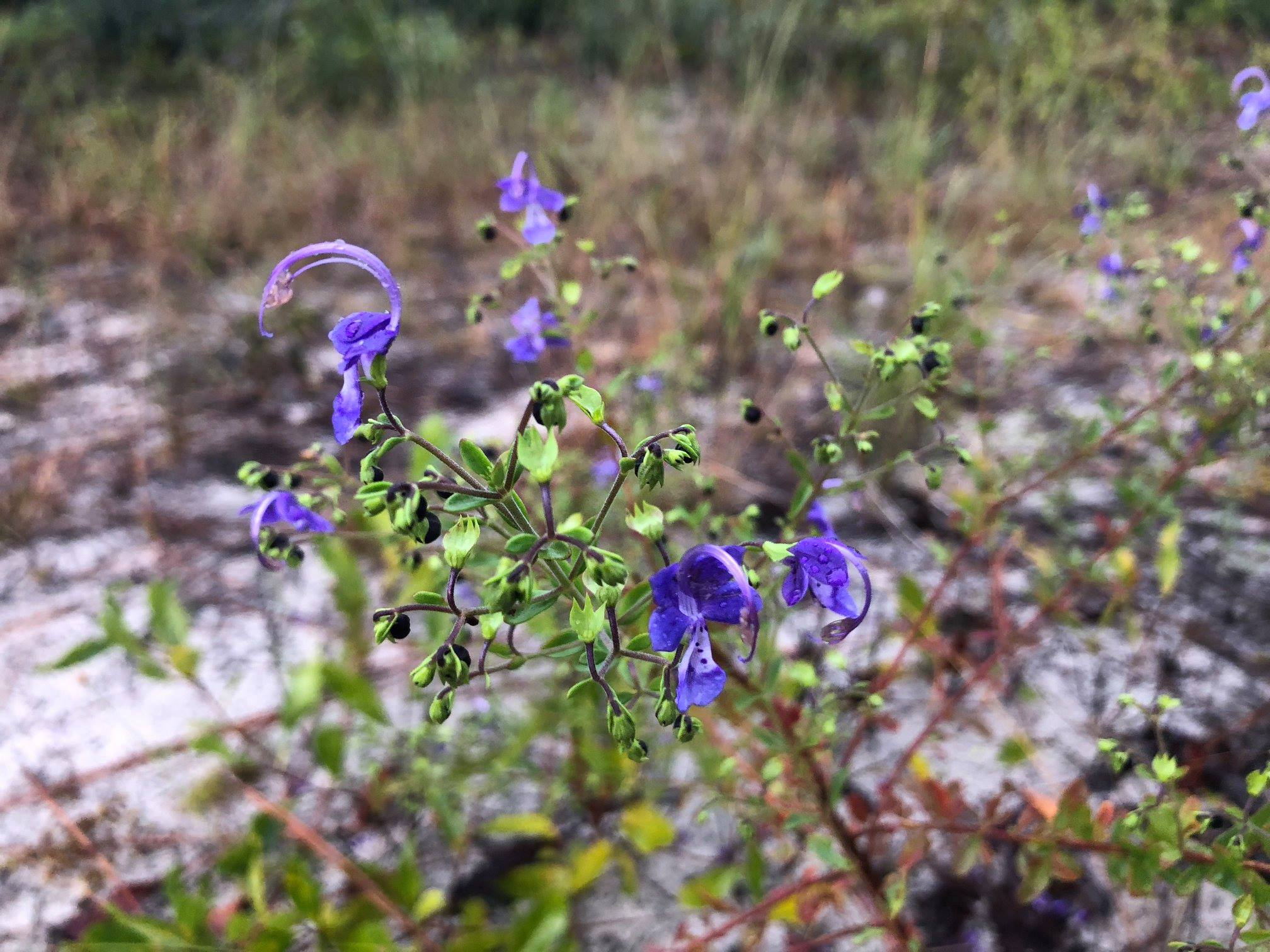

Conservation status
- Critically Imperiled (NatureServe)

Scientific classification
- Kingdom: Plantae
- Clade: Tracheophytes
- Clade: Angiosperms
- Clade: Eudicots
- Clade: Asterids
- Order: Lamiales
- Family: Lamiaceae
- Genus: Trichostema
- Species: T. suffrutescens

Binomial name
- Trichostema suffrutescens Kearney

= Trichostema suffrutescens =

Species of flowering plant

Trichostema suffrutescens is a species of flowering plant in the mint family (Lamiaceae). It is endemic to northern and central Florida in the southeastern United States. The species was first described in the late 19th century and is currently accepted by major taxonomic authorities.

== Taxonomy ==
Trichostema suffrutescens was formally described by Thomas Henry Kearney in 1894 in the Bulletin of the Torrey Botanical Club. The name is accepted by Plants of the World Online. This species is currently treated as a synonym of Trichostema dichotomum by the Florida Plant Atlas, citing an overlap in leaf size between the two species. Morphological and genetic studies, however, have supported its recognition as a species separate from Trichostema dichotomum.

== Description ==
Trichostema suffrutescens is a woody or semi-woody perennial herb, as indicated by the specific epithet suffrutescens. Like other members of the genus, it has opposite leaves, square stems, and bilaterally symmetrical flowers typical of the mint family. Detailed diagnostic morphological characters were provided in the original description and subsequent floristic treatments.

== Distribution and habitat ==
The species is endemic to the Mt. Dora, Trail Ridge, and Orlando ridges of Florida. It is limited to scrub, sandhill, and similarly dry upland habitats. Further details on habitat preferences have been documented in regional floras and botanical surveys.

== Conservation ==
Trichostema suffrutescens is not tracked by the Florida Natural Areas Inventory (FNAI). NatureServe lists this species as G1G2, rounded to G1 (Critically Imperiled) because of its limited habitat, though it notes that further studies are needed to better assess the global rank of this species.

== Gallery ==
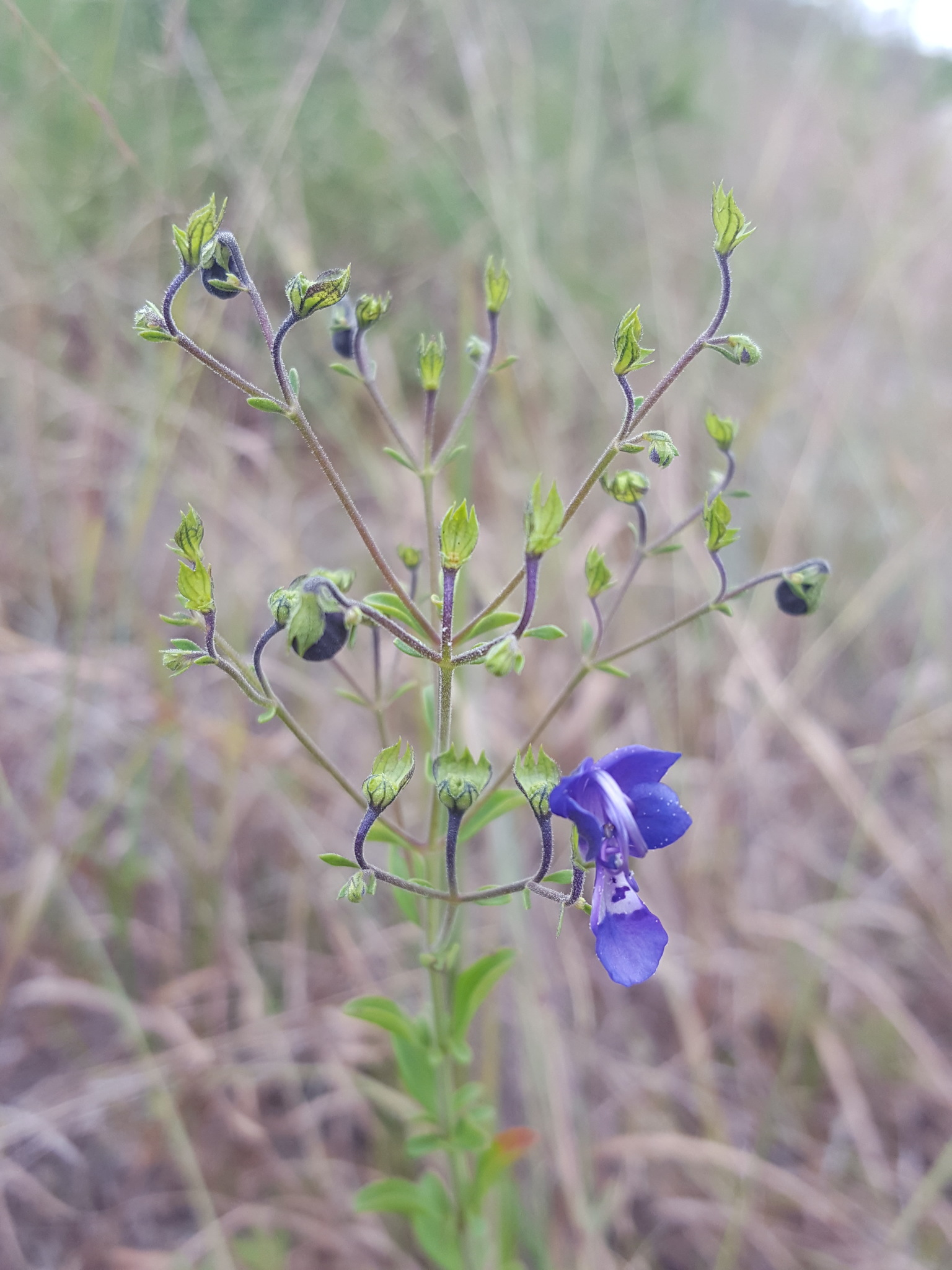
Inflorescence

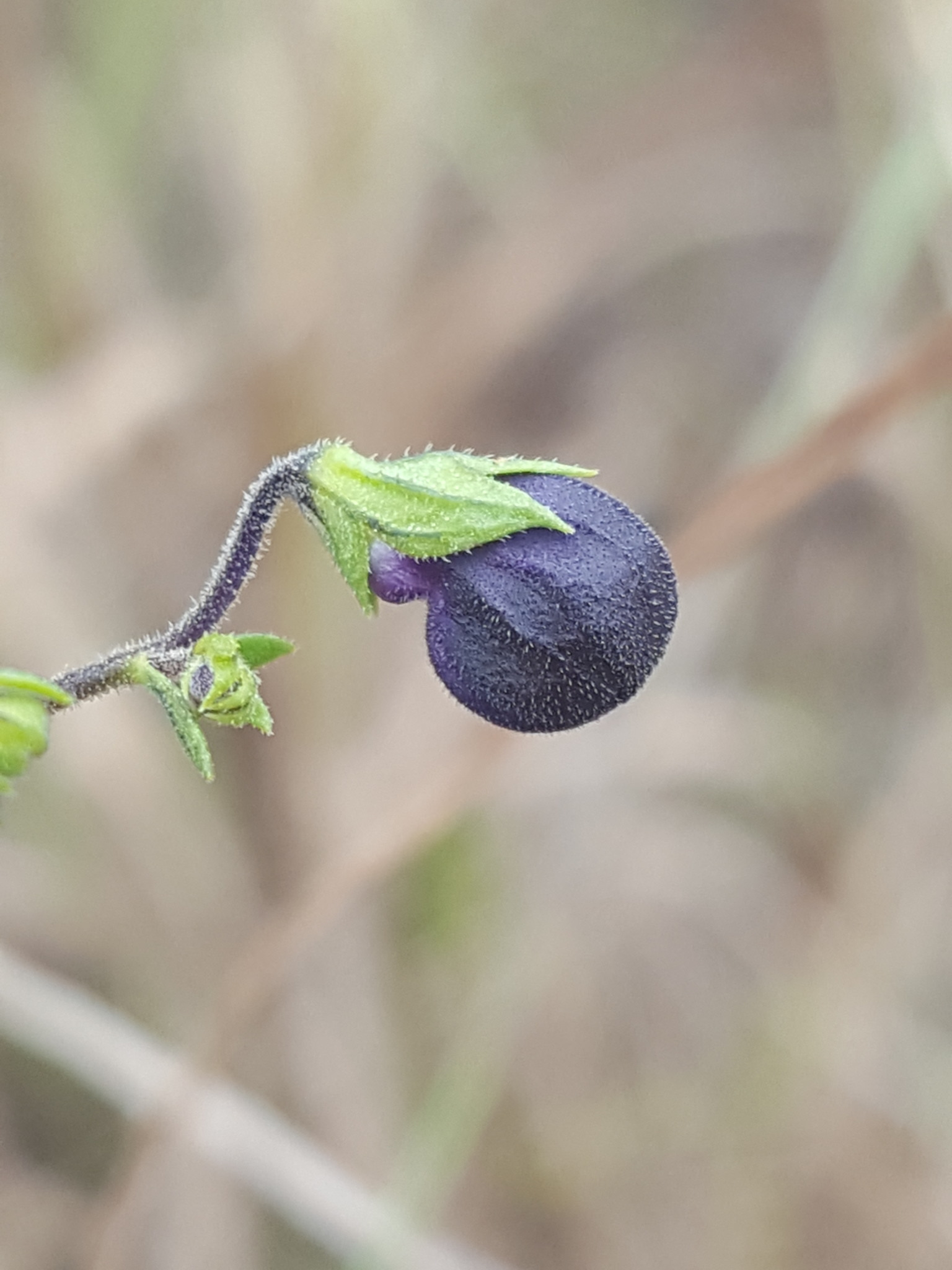
Budding flower

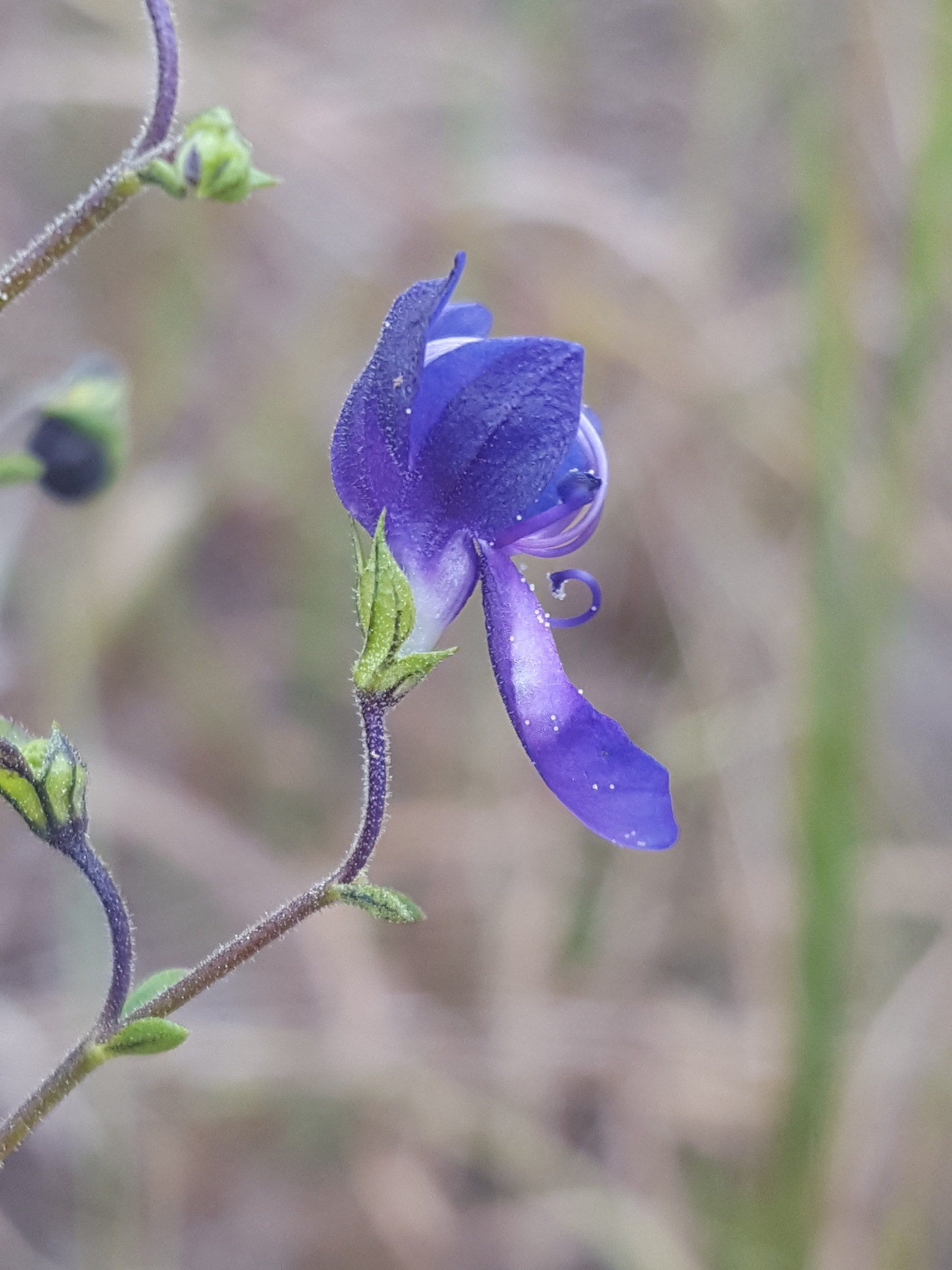
Flower

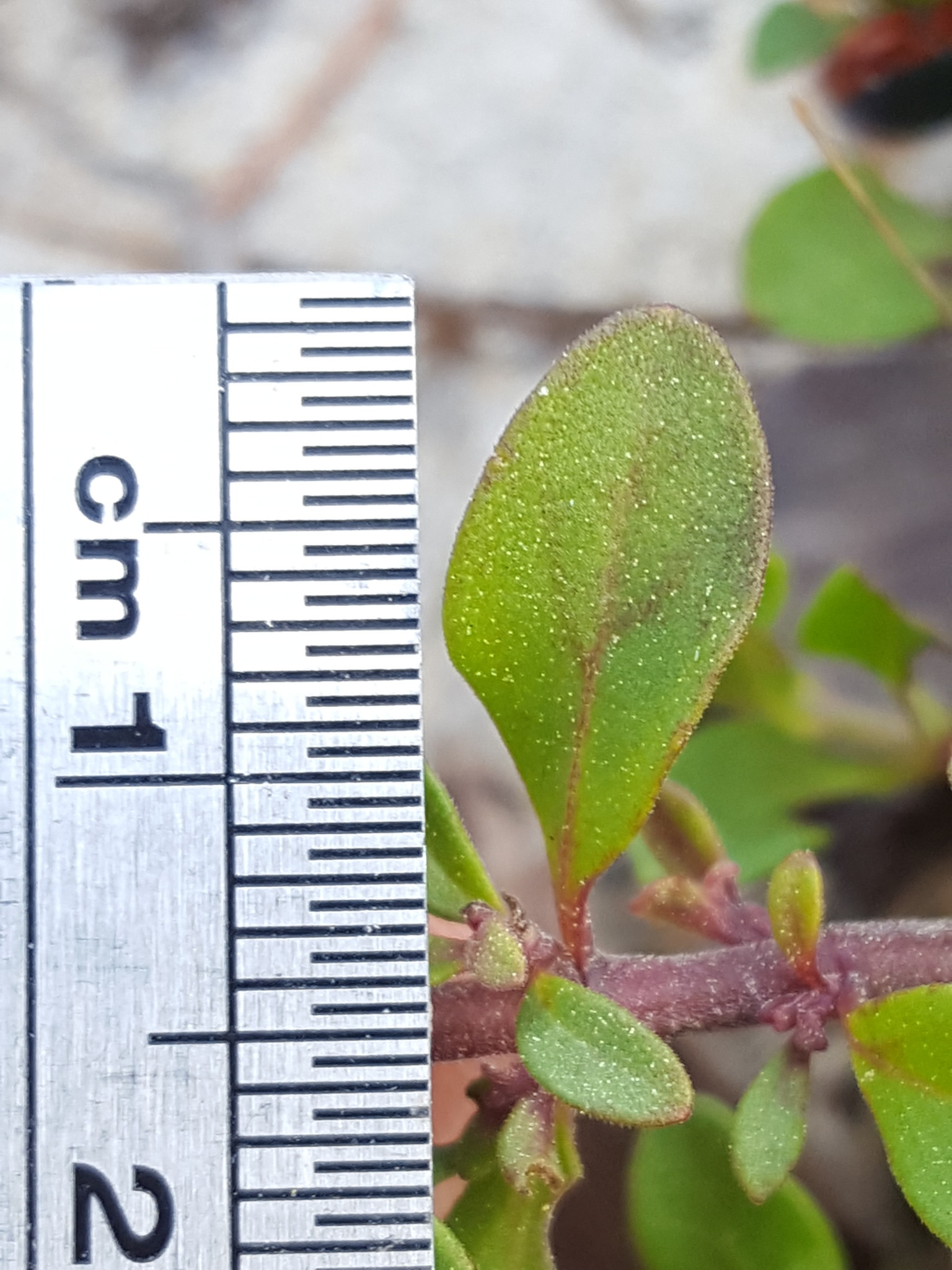
Leaf with scale
