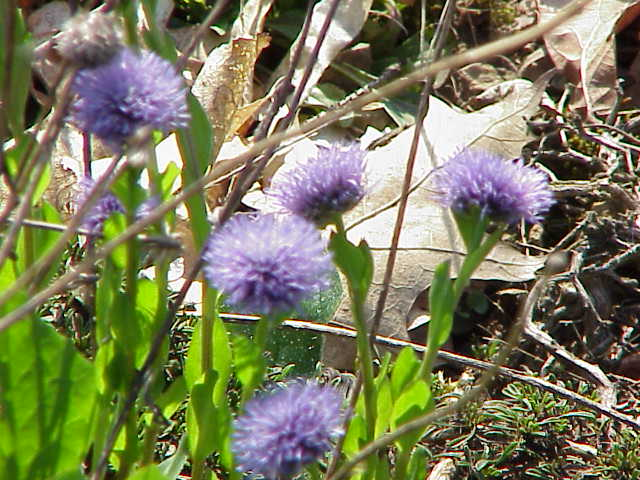

Scientific classification
- Kingdom: Plantae
- Clade: Tracheophytes
- Clade: Angiosperms
- Clade: Eudicots
- Clade: Asterids
- Order: Lamiales
- Family: Plantaginaceae
- Genus: Globularia
- Species: G. trichosantha

Binomial name
- Globularia trichosantha Fisch. & C.A.Mey.

Synonyms
- Globularia macrantha K.Koch ex Walp.; Globularia pallida K.Koch

= Globularia trichosantha =

Species of flowering plant

Globularia trichosantha is an ornamental plant in the family Plantaginaceae. It is a mat-forming evergreen with oval leaves that blooms from early spring and through the summer carrying pale blue flowers that brighten in the summer.
