= Nothris sulcella =

Scientific classification
- Domain: Eukaryota
- Kingdom: Animalia
- Phylum: Arthropoda
- Class: Insecta
- Order: Lepidoptera
- Family: Gelechiidae
- Genus: Nothris
- Species: N. sulcella

Binomial name
- Nothris sulcella Staudinger, 1859

Synonyms
- Nothris magna Nel & Peslier, 2007

Species of moth

Nothris sulcella is a moth in the family Gelechiidae. It was described by Otto Staudinger in 1859. It is found in Asia Minor.

The wingspan is about 32 mm. The forewings are grey with three black dots in the fold, before and at the end of the cell. There are dark streaks at the outer margin. The hindwings are light grey in females and dark grey in males.
