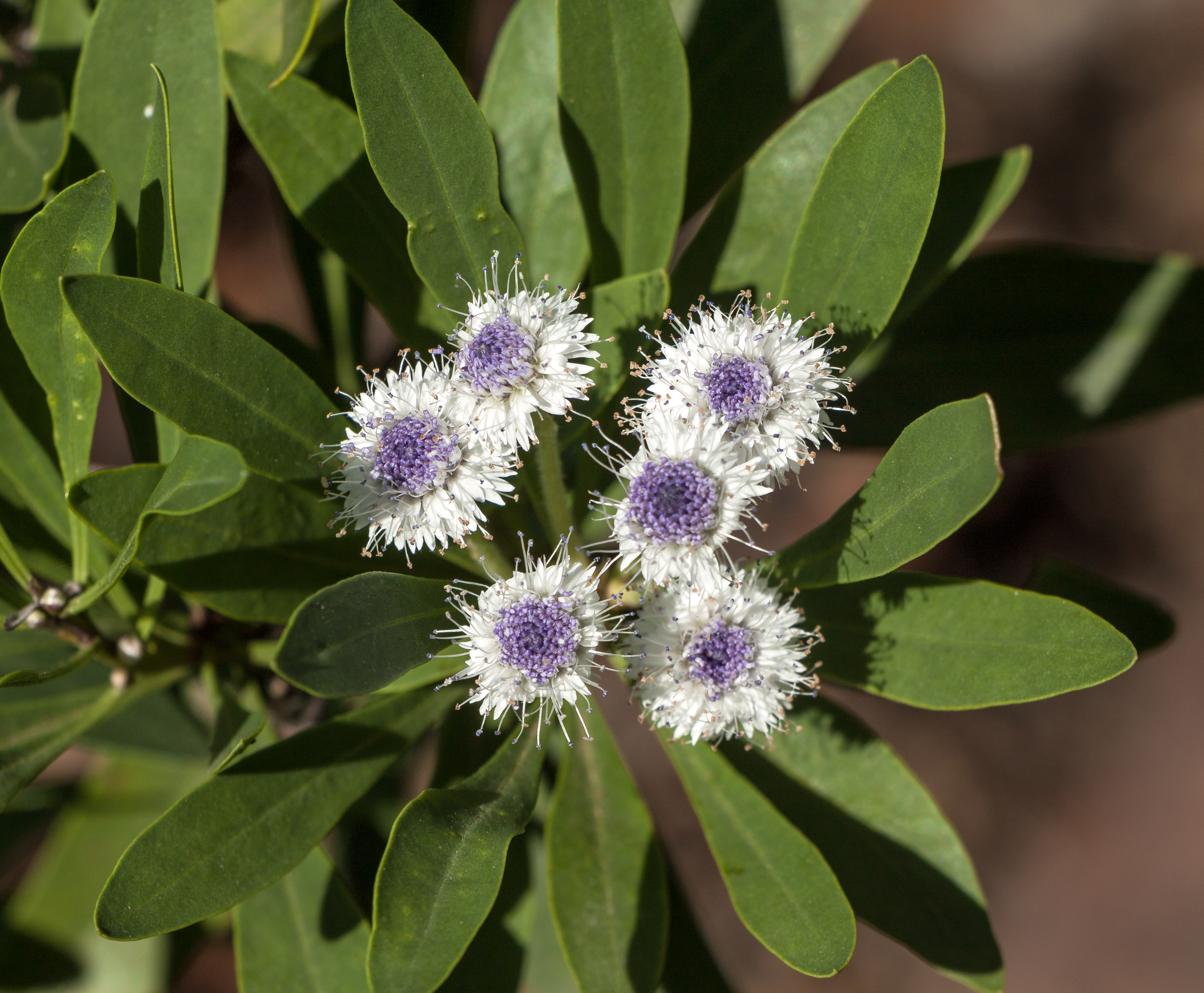

Scientific classification
- Kingdom: Plantae
- Clade: Tracheophytes
- Clade: Angiosperms
- Clade: Eudicots
- Clade: Asterids
- Order: Lamiales
- Family: Plantaginaceae
- Genus: Globularia
- Species: G. ascanii

Binomial name
- Globularia ascanii Bramwell & Kunkel.

= Globularia ascanii =

Species of flowering plant

Globularia ascanii is native to Gran Canaria island of the Canary Islands archipelago.

It is very rare and found on the Tamadaba Massif, in cliffs of the pine forest zone in Barranco Oscuro (~1200 m).

It is a small procumbent shrublet resembling G. sarcophylla but with larger broadly lanceolate leaves (5–10 cm), short peduncles (1–2 cm) and pale blue white flowers.

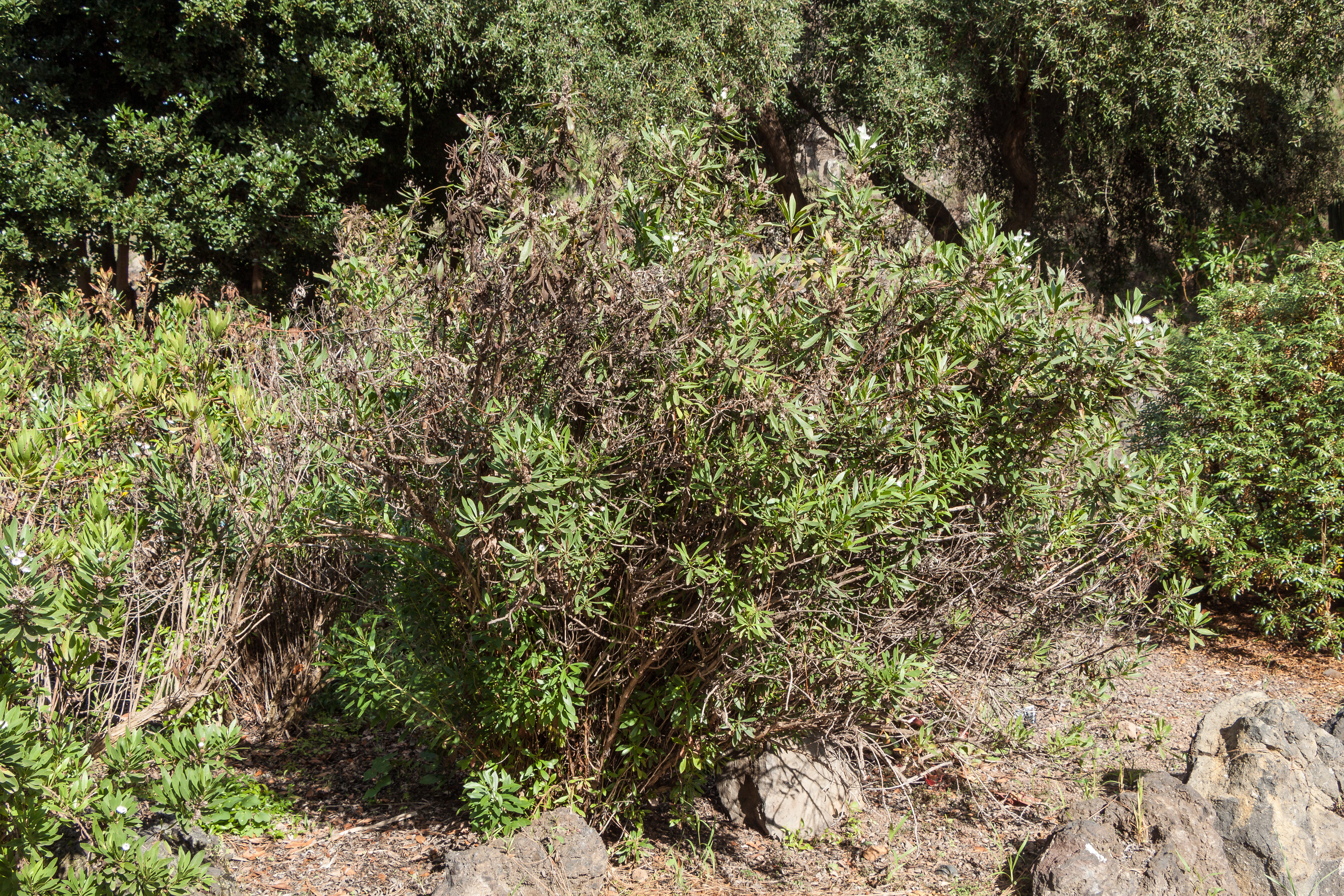
In the Jardín Botánico Canario Viera y Clavijo on Gran Canaria.
