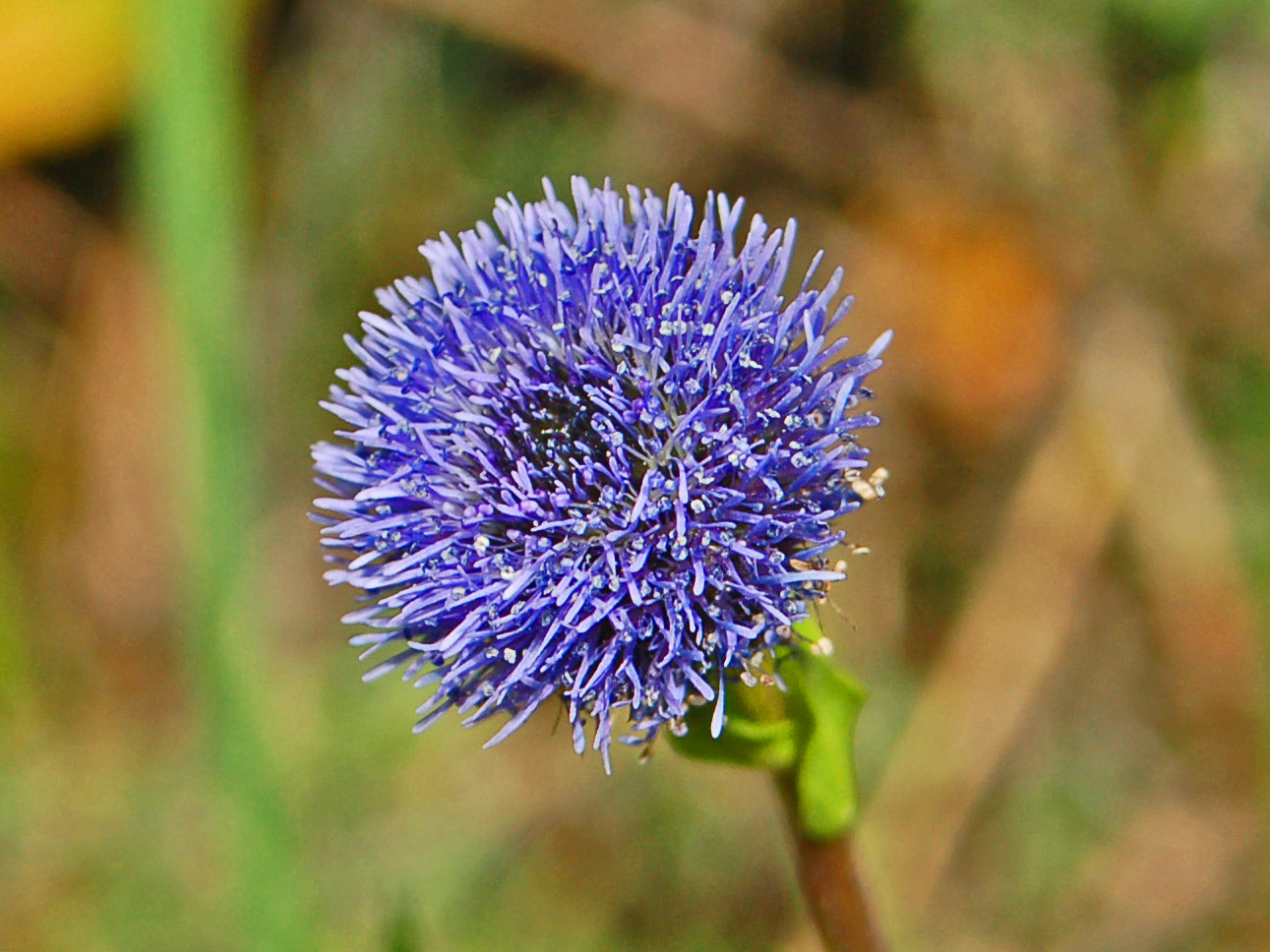
- Flower of Globularia bisnagarica

Scientific classification
- Kingdom: Plantae
- Clade: Tracheophytes
- Clade: Angiosperms
- Clade: Eudicots
- Clade: Asterids
- Order: Lamiales
- Family: Plantaginaceae
- Genus: Globularia
- Species: G. bisnagarica

Binomial name
- Globularia bisnagarica L.

Synonyms
- Globularia aphyllanthes Crantz; Globularia elongata Hegetschw.; Globularia punctata Lapeyr.; Globularia willkommii Nyman

= Globularia bisnagarica =

Species of flowering plant

Globularia bisnagarica, the common ball flower, is a species of plants belonging to the family Plantaginaceae.

== Description ==
Globularia bisnagarica grows to 10–30 centimetres (3.9–11.8 in) in height. It is a perennial plant with bright blue spherical flowerheads and dark green, leathery, spathulate leaves, veined beneath. The flowering period extends from March to June.

== Distribution ==
This species can be found in Central and Southern Europe. It occurs in meadows at an elevation of 0–1,500 metres (0–4,921 ft) above sea level.
