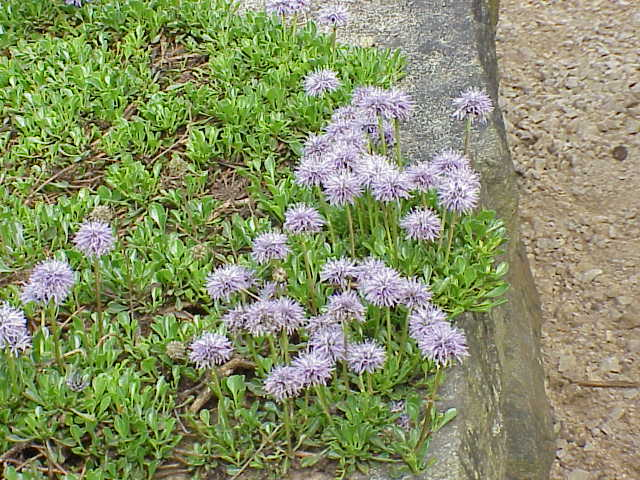

Scientific classification
- Kingdom: Plantae
- Clade: Tracheophytes
- Clade: Angiosperms
- Clade: Eudicots
- Clade: Asterids
- Order: Lamiales
- Family: Plantaginaceae
- Genus: Globularia
- Species: G. cordifolia

Binomial name
- Globularia cordifolia L.

= Globularia cordifolia =

Species of flowering plant

Globularia cordifolia, the heart-leaved globe daisy, is a species of flowering plant in the family Plantaginaceae, native to the mountains of central and southern Europe, and western Turkey.

It is a mat-forming evergreen perennial growing to 5 cm (2 in) tall by 20 cm (8 in) wide, with spherical, fluffy, pale lilac flowers in summer. In cultivation it requires the open aspect, full sun and sharp drainage of its native habitat, and is best grown in an alpine garden.

The Latin specific epithet cordifolia means “with heart-shaped leaves”.

This plant has gained the Royal Horticultural Society's Award of Garden Merit.
