= Evergestis merceti =

Scientific classification
- Domain: Eukaryota
- Kingdom: Animalia
- Phylum: Arthropoda
- Class: Insecta
- Order: Lepidoptera
- Family: Crambidae
- Genus: Evergestis
- Species: E. merceti

Binomial name
- Evergestis merceti Agenjo, 1933

Species of moth

Evergestis merceti is a species of moth in the family Crambidae. It is found in Spain.

The wingspan is 29–31 mm. Adults are on wing from September to October.

The larvae probably feed on Biscutella species.
