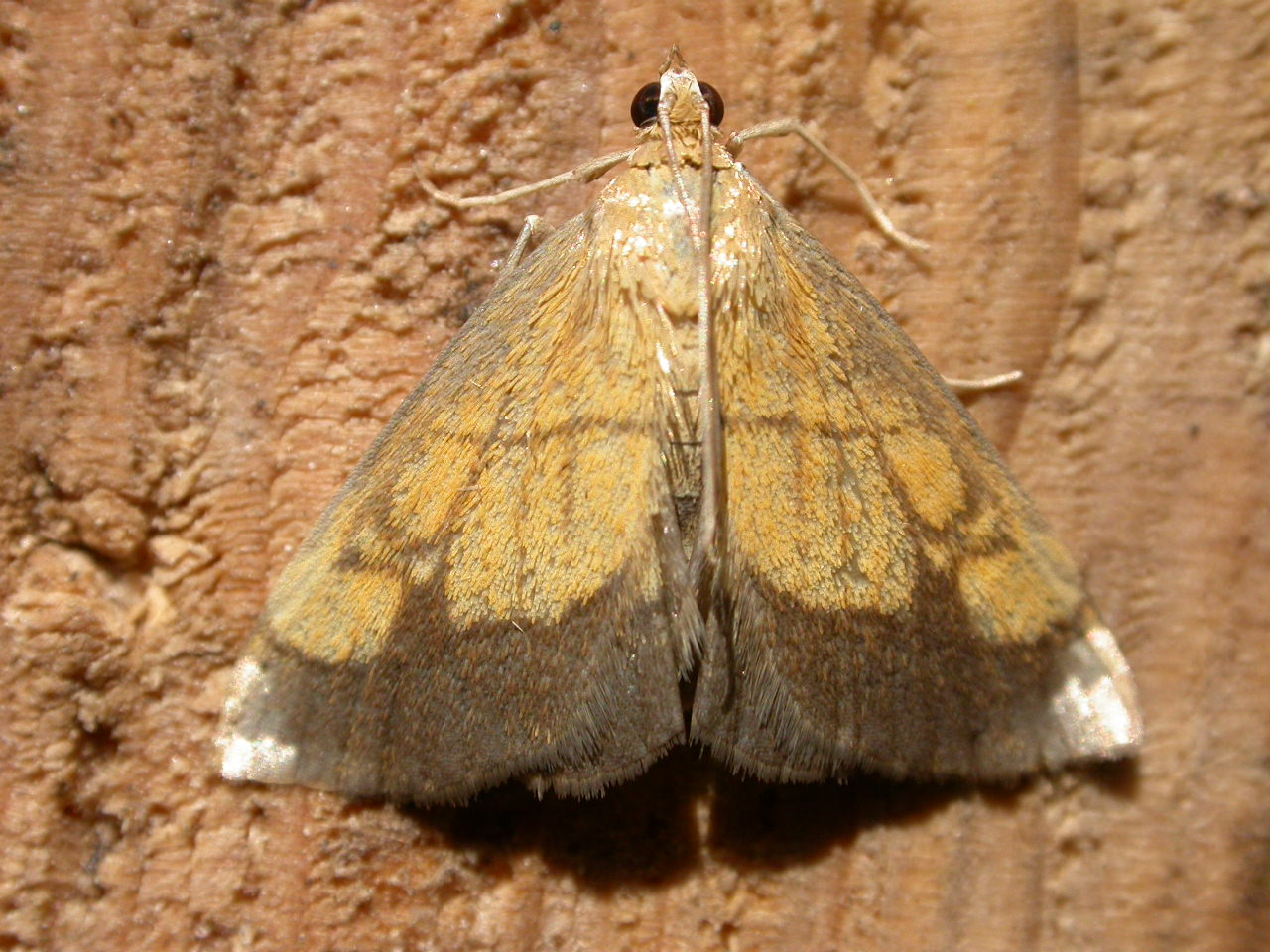
- Evergestis limbata

Scientific classification
- Kingdom: Animalia
- Phylum: Arthropoda
- Clade: Pancrustacea
- Class: Insecta
- Order: Lepidoptera
- Family: Crambidae
- Subfamily: Glaphyriinae
- Genus: Evergestis; Hübner, 1825

Synonyms
- List: Aedis Grote, 1878; Paraedis Grote, 1882; Paroedis Hampson, 1899; Euergestis Warren, 1892; Euergestis Rebel, 1906-07; Homochroa Hübner, 1825; Maelinoptera Staudinger, 1893; Mesographe Hübner, 1825; Orobena Guenée, 1854; Pachyzancloides Matsumura, 1925; Pionea Duponchel, 1845; Reskovitsia Szent-Ivány, 1942; Scopolia Hübner, 1825

= Evergestis =

Genus of moth

Evergestis is a genus of moths of the family Crambidae described by Jacob Hübner in 1825. A number of species are pests, including the cross-striped cabbageworm (E. rimosalis), a pest of cole crops such as cabbage.

== Species ==
- Evergestis aegyptiacalis Caradja, 1916
- Evergestis aenealis (Denis & Schiffermüller, 1775)
- Evergestis africalis (Guenée, 1854)
- Evergestis albifasciaria Chen & Wang, 2013
- Evergestis albifuscalis (Hampson, 1900)
- Evergestis alborivulalis (Eversmann, 1843)
- Evergestis anartalis (Staudinger, 1892)
- Evergestis angustalis (Barnes & McDunnough, 1918)
- Evergestis anticlina Munroe, 1959
- Evergestis antofagastalis Munroe, 1959
- Evergestis arcuatalis (Hampson, 1900)
- Evergestis aridalis Barnes & McDunnough, 1914
- Evergestis atrapuncta Maes, 2011
- Evergestis borregalis Munroe, 1974
- Evergestis boursini Amsel, 1939
- Evergestis brunnea Munroe, 1959
- Evergestis caesialis (Herrich-Schäffer, [1849])
- Evergestis comstocki Munroe, 1974
- Evergestis consimilis Warren, 1892
- Evergestis desertalis (Hübner, 1813)
- Evergestis dilutalis (Herrich-Schäffer, 1848)
- Evergestis dischematalis Munroe, 1995
- Evergestis dognini Hampson, 1918
- Evergestis dumerlei Leraut, 2003
- Evergestis dusmeti Agenjo, 1955
- Evergestis eurekalis Barnes & McDunnough, 1914
- Evergestis exoticalis (Snellen, 1875)
- Evergestis extimalis (Scopoli, 1763)
- Evergestis forficalis (Linnaeus, 1758) – garden pebble
- Evergestis frumentalis (Linnaeus, 1761)
- Evergestis fulgura (Cerf, 1933)
- Evergestis funalis (Grote, 1878)
- Evergestis holophaealis (Hampson, 1913)
- Evergestis hordealis Chrétien, 1915
- Evergestis hyrcanalis Amsel, 1961
- Evergestis infirmalis (Staudinger, 1870)
- Evergestis inglorialis Hampson, 1918
- Evergestis insiola (Dyar, 1925)
- Evergestis isatidalis (Duponchel, 1833)
- Evergestis junctalis Warren, 1892
- Evergestis koepckei Munroe, 1959
- Evergestis laristanalis Amsel, 1961
- Evergestis lichenalis Hampson, 1900
- Evergestis limbata (Linnaeus, 1767)
- Evergestis lunulalis Barnes & McDunnough, 1914
- Evergestis lupalis Zerny, 1928
- Evergestis marionalis Leraut, 2003
- Evergestis marocana (D. Lucas, 1956)
- Evergestis merceti Agenjo, 1933
- Evergestis mimounalis (Oberthür, 1922)
- Evergestis montis Maes, 2011
- Evergestis mundalis (Guenée, 1854)
- Evergestis nolentis Heinrich, 1940
- Evergestis nomadalis (Lederer, 1870)
- Evergestis obliqualis (Grote, 1883)
- Evergestis obscuralis (Hampson, 1912)
- Evergestis osthelderi (Schawerda, 1932)
- Evergestis pallidata (Hufnagel, 1767)
- Evergestis palousalis Munroe, 1974
- Evergestis pechi (Bethune-Baker, 1885)
- Evergestis perobliqualis Hampson in Elwes, Hampson & Durrant, 1906
- Evergestis placens (Walker, [1866])
- Evergestis plumbofascialis (Ragonot, 1894)
- Evergestis politalis (Denis & Schiffermüller, 1775)
- Evergestis rimosalis (Guenée, 1854)
- Evergestis russulatalis (Hampson, 1900)
- Evergestis scopicalis Hampson, 1908
- Evergestis segetalis (Herrich-Schäffer, 1851)
- Evergestis serratalis (Staudinger, 1870)
- Evergestis sexmaculosus Matsumura, 1925
- Evergestis simulatilis (Grote, 1880)
- Evergestis sophialis (Fabricius, 1787)
- Evergestis spiniferalis (Staudinger, 1900)
- Evergestis subfuscalis (Staudinger, 1870)
- Evergestis subterminalis Barnes & McDunnough, 1914
- Evergestis triangulalis Barnes & McDunnough, 1914
- Evergestis umbrosalis (Fischer von Röslerstamm, 1842)
- Evergestis unimacula (Grote & Robinson, 1867)
- Evergestis vinctalis Barnes & McDunnough, 1914

== Former species ==
- Evergestis flavicinctalis Snellen, 1890
- Evergestis terminalis (Mabille, 1880)

== Status unclear ==
- Evergestis bilinealis

== Gallery ==
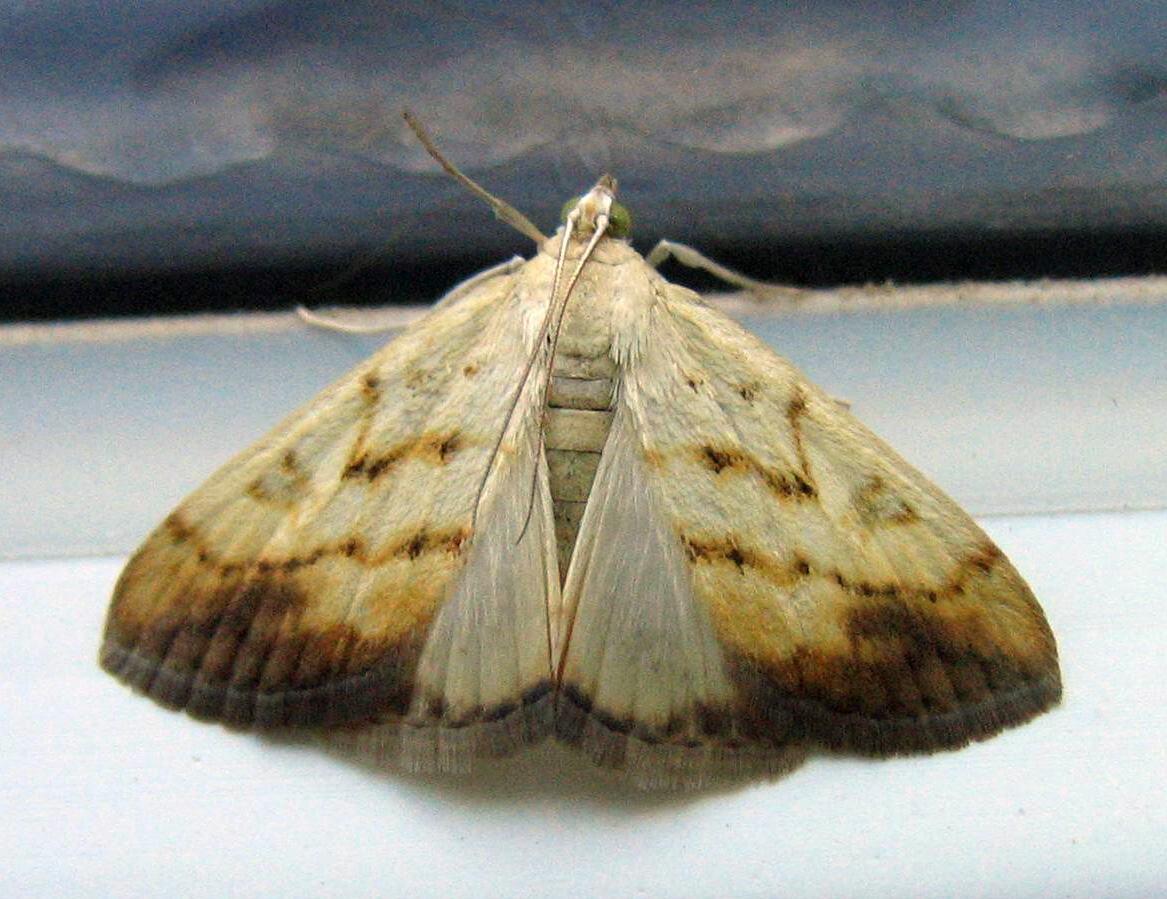
Evergestis extimalis

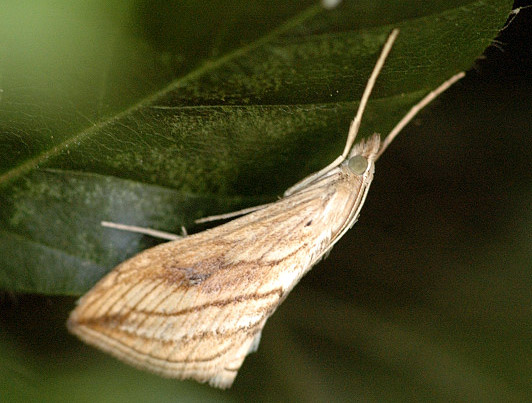
Evergestis forficalis
