= Evergestis mundalis =

Scientific classification
- Kingdom: Animalia
- Phylum: Arthropoda
- Class: Insecta
- Order: Lepidoptera
- Family: Crambidae
- Genus: Evergestis
- Species: E. mundalis

Binomial name
- Evergestis mundalis (Guenee, 1854)

Synonyms
- Scopula mundalis Guenee, 1854; Orobena submundalis Millière, 1882

Species of moth

Evergestis mundalis is a species of moth in the family Crambidae described by Achille Guenée in 1854. It is found in France, Spain, Italy and Greece. In the east, the range extends to Armenia.

The wingspan is about 26 mm.

The larvae feed on Brassicaceae species, possibly Biscutella laevigata and Erysimum nevadense.

== Subspecies ==
- Evergestis mundalis mundalis
- Evergestis mundalis permundalis Marion, 1960
