= Evergestis dusmeti =

Scientific classification
- Domain: Eukaryota
- Kingdom: Animalia
- Phylum: Arthropoda
- Class: Insecta
- Order: Lepidoptera
- Family: Crambidae
- Genus: Evergestis
- Species: E. dusmeti

Binomial name
- Evergestis dusmeti Agenjo, 1955

Synonyms
- Evergestis dumesti Rungs, 1979

Species of moth

Evergestis dusmeti is a species of moth in the family Crambidae. It is found in Spain and North Africa, including Morocco.
