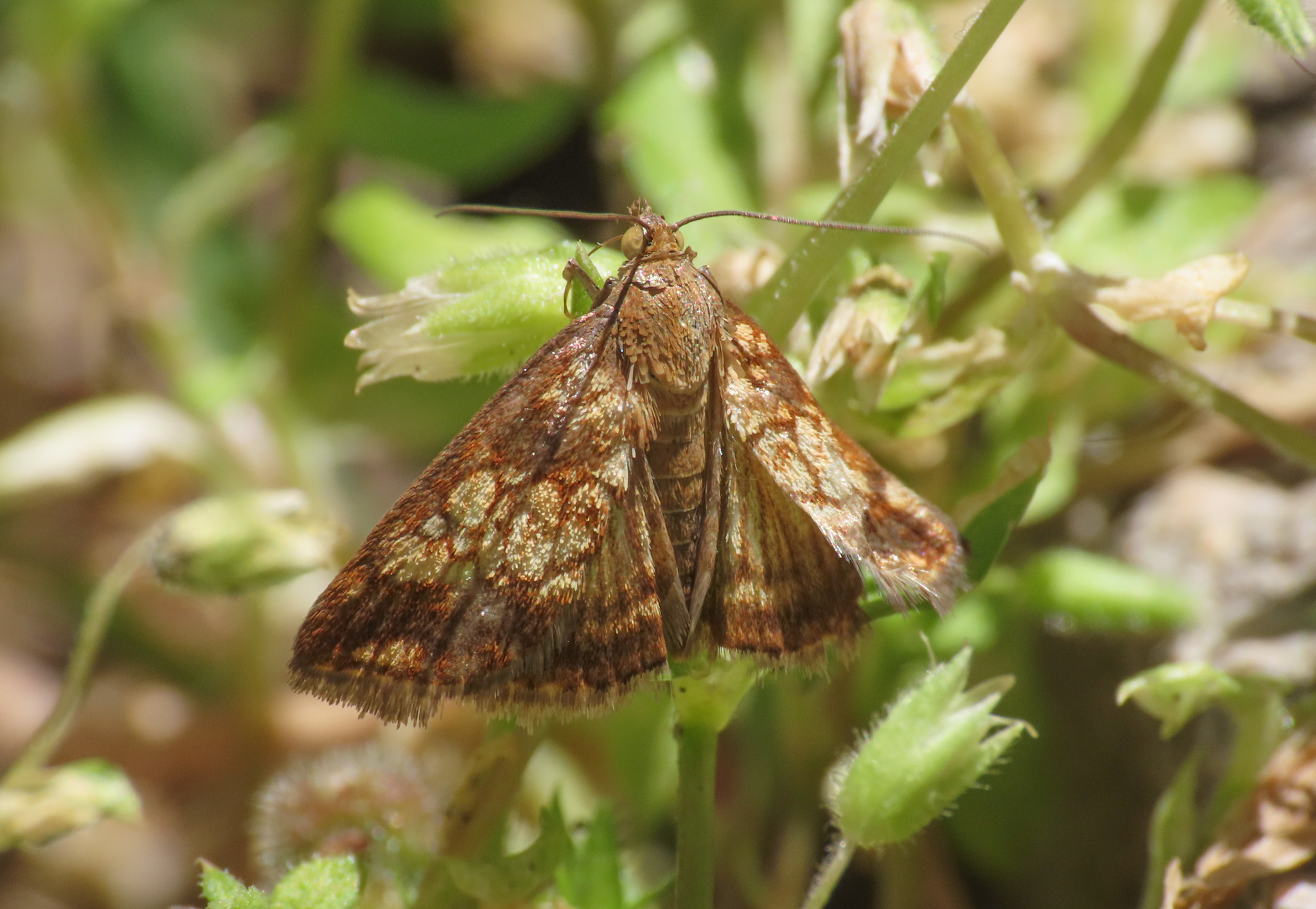

Scientific classification
- Domain: Eukaryota
- Kingdom: Animalia
- Phylum: Arthropoda
- Class: Insecta
- Order: Lepidoptera
- Family: Crambidae
- Genus: Evergestis
- Species: E. politalis

Binomial name
- Evergestis politalis (Denis & Schiffermuller, 1775)

Synonyms
- Pyralis politalis Denis & Schiffermuller, 1775; Pionea politalis bifascialis Guenée, 1849; Botys dispersalis Mann, 1859; Orobena bicoloralis La Harpe, 1860; Phalaena pictoralis Fabricius, 1794

= Evergestis politalis =

Species of moth

Evergestis politalis is a species of moth in the family Crambidae. It is found in most of Europe (except Ireland, Great Britain, the Netherlands, Fennoscandia, the Baltic region and Greece), North Africa (including Algeria) and Central Asia (including Kyrgyzstan and Kazakhstan).

The wingspan is about 18 mm.

The larvae feed on Biscutella laevigata.
