= Evergestis perobliqualis =

Scientific classification
- Kingdom: Animalia
- Phylum: Arthropoda
- Class: Insecta
- Order: Lepidoptera
- Family: Crambidae
- Genus: Evergestis
- Species: E. perobliqualis

Binomial name
- Evergestis perobliqualis Hampson in Elwes, Hampson & Durrant, 1906

Species of moth

Evergestis perobliqualis is a moth in the family Crambidae. It was described by George Hampson in 1906. It is found in Tibet, China.
