= Evergestis mimounalis =

Scientific classification
- Domain: Eukaryota
- Kingdom: Animalia
- Phylum: Arthropoda
- Class: Insecta
- Order: Lepidoptera
- Family: Crambidae
- Genus: Evergestis
- Species: E. mimounalis

Binomial name
- Evergestis mimounalis (Oberthür, 1922)

Synonyms
- Orobena mimounalis Oberthür, 1922; Evergestis mimounalis distinctalis Rungs, 1975

Species of moth

Evergestis mimounalis is a species of moth in the family Crambidae. It is found in the Middle Atlas and High Atlas mountains in Morocco.
