= Evergestis africalis =

Scientific classification
- Kingdom: Animalia
- Phylum: Arthropoda
- Class: Insecta
- Order: Lepidoptera
- Family: Crambidae
- Genus: Evergestis
- Species: E. africalis

Binomial name
- Evergestis africalis (Guenee, 1854)

Synonyms
- Pionea africalis Guenee, 1854; Botys orbitalis C. Felder, R. Felder & Rogenhofer, 1875; Pionea zonalis La Harpe, 1860; Rivula vicarialis Walker, 1866; Scopula concisalis Walker, [1866]

Species of moth

Evergestis africalis is a species of moth in the family Crambidae. It is found on Sicily and in Algeria, South Africa and Iran.

The wingspan is about 31 mm. Adults are on wing in October in Algeria.
