= Evergestis sexmaculosus =

Scientific classification
- Kingdom: Animalia
- Phylum: Arthropoda
- Clade: Pancrustacea
- Class: Insecta
- Order: Lepidoptera
- Family: Crambidae
- Genus: Evergestis
- Species: E. sexmaculosus

Binomial name
- Evergestis sexmaculosus (Matsumura, 1925)

Synonyms
- Pachyzancloides sexmaculosus Matsumura, 1925

Species of moth

Evergestis sexmaculosus is a moth in the family Crambidae. It was described by Shōnen Matsumura in 1925. It is found in Russia.
