= Evergestis angustalis =

Scientific classification
- Domain: Eukaryota
- Kingdom: Animalia
- Phylum: Arthropoda
- Class: Insecta
- Order: Lepidoptera
- Family: Crambidae
- Genus: Evergestis
- Species: E. angustalis

Binomial name
- Evergestis angustalis (Barnes & McDunnough, 1918)

Synonyms
- Phlyctaenia angustalis Barnes & McDunnough, 1918

Species of moth

Evergestis angustalis is a moth in the family Crambidae. It was described by William Barnes and James Halliday McDunnough in 1918. It is found in North America, where it has been recorded from California and Arizona.

The wingspan is about 30 mm. Adults are on wing from December to April and from July to August.

== Subspecies ==
- Evergestis angustalis angustalis (California)
- Evergestis angustalis arizonae Munroe, 1974 (Arizona)
- Evergestis angustalis catalinae Munroe, 1974 (California: Santa Catalina Island)
