= Evergestis nolentis =

Scientific classification
- Domain: Eukaryota
- Kingdom: Animalia
- Phylum: Arthropoda
- Class: Insecta
- Order: Lepidoptera
- Family: Crambidae
- Genus: Evergestis
- Species: E. nolentis

Binomial name
- Evergestis nolentis Heinrich, 1940

Species of moth

Evergestis nolentis is a moth in the family Crambidae. It was described by Carl Heinrich in 1940. It is found in North America, where it has been recorded from California.
