= Evergestis obscuralis =

Scientific classification
- Kingdom: Animalia
- Phylum: Arthropoda
- Class: Insecta
- Order: Lepidoptera
- Family: Crambidae
- Genus: Evergestis
- Species: E. obscuralis

Binomial name
- Evergestis obscuralis (Hampson, 1912)

Synonyms
- Lygropia obscuralis Hampson, 1912

Species of moth

Evergestis obscuralis is a moth in the family Crambidae. It was described by George Hampson in 1912. It is found in Venezuela.
