= Evergestis dilutalis =

Scientific classification
- Domain: Eukaryota
- Kingdom: Animalia
- Phylum: Arthropoda
- Class: Insecta
- Order: Lepidoptera
- Family: Crambidae
- Genus: Evergestis
- Species: E. dilutalis

Binomial name
- Evergestis dilutalis (Herrich-Schäffer, 1848)

Synonyms
- Botys dilutalis Herrich-Schäffer, 1848; Evergestis ostrogovichi Caradja, 1929

Species of moth

Evergestis dilutalis is an elusive species of moth in the family Crambidae. It is found in Romania and Ukraine.

The wingspan of these moths is about 30 mm (1.2 in). Adults are on wing from the end of June to July.

This species has not been spotted in the last forty years.
