= Evergestis holophaealis =

Scientific classification
- Kingdom: Animalia
- Phylum: Arthropoda
- Class: Insecta
- Order: Lepidoptera
- Family: Crambidae
- Genus: Evergestis
- Species: E. holophaealis

Binomial name
- Evergestis holophaealis (Hampson, 1913)

Synonyms
- Pyrausta holophaealis Hampson, 1913

Species of moth

Evergestis holophaealis is a moth in the family Crambidae. It was described by George Hampson in 1913. It is found in China and Japan.
