= Evergestis borregalis =

Scientific classification
- Domain: Eukaryota
- Kingdom: Animalia
- Phylum: Arthropoda
- Class: Insecta
- Order: Lepidoptera
- Family: Crambidae
- Genus: Evergestis
- Species: E. borregalis

Binomial name
- Evergestis borregalis Munroe, 1974

Species of moth

Evergestis borregalis is a moth in the family Crambidae. It was described by Eugene G. Munroe in 1974. It is found in North America, where it has been recorded from California and New Mexico.
