= Evergestis arcuatalis =

Scientific classification
- Kingdom: Animalia
- Phylum: Arthropoda
- Class: Insecta
- Order: Lepidoptera
- Family: Crambidae
- Genus: Evergestis
- Species: E. arcuatalis

Binomial name
- Evergestis arcuatalis (Hampson, 1900)

Synonyms
- Noctuelia arcuatalis Hampson, 1900

Species of moth

Evergestis arcuatalis is a moth in the family Crambidae. It was described by George Hampson in 1900. It is found in Uzbekistan.
