= Evergestis fulgura =

Scientific classification
- Domain: Eukaryota
- Kingdom: Animalia
- Phylum: Arthropoda
- Class: Insecta
- Order: Lepidoptera
- Family: Crambidae
- Genus: Evergestis
- Species: E. fulgura

Binomial name
- Evergestis fulgura (Le Cerf, 1933)

Synonyms
- Orobena fulgura Cerf, 1933; Pionea jeannelalis D. Lucas, 1946

Species of moth

Evergestis fulgura is a species of moth in the family Crambidae. It is found in Morocco.

The wingspan is about 38 mm. In the Middle Atlas Mountains, adults are on wing in August. In Meknès, adults have been recorded in October.
