= Evergestis lupalis =

Scientific classification
- Domain: Eukaryota
- Kingdom: Animalia
- Phylum: Arthropoda
- Class: Insecta
- Order: Lepidoptera
- Family: Crambidae
- Genus: Evergestis
- Species: E. lupalis

Binomial name
- Evergestis lupalis Zerny, 1928

Species of moth

Evergestis lupalis is a species of moth in the family Crambidae. It is found in Spain.

The wingspan is 26–33 mm. Adults are on wing in July.

== Subspecies ==
- Evergestis lupalis lupalis (Spain: Sierra Nevada)
- Evergestis lupalis poecilalis Zerny, 1935 (Spain: Sierra de Gredos)
