= Evergestis hyrcanalis =

Scientific classification
- Domain: Eukaryota
- Kingdom: Animalia
- Phylum: Arthropoda
- Class: Insecta
- Order: Lepidoptera
- Family: Crambidae
- Genus: Evergestis
- Species: E. hyrcanalis

Binomial name
- Evergestis hyrcanalis Amsel, 1961

Species of moth

Evergestis hyrcanalis is a moth in the family Crambidae. It was described by Hans Georg Amsel in 1961. It is found in Iran.
