= Evergestis umbrosalis =

Scientific classification
- Kingdom: Animalia
- Phylum: Arthropoda
- Class: Insecta
- Order: Lepidoptera
- Family: Crambidae
- Genus: Evergestis
- Species: E. umbrosalis

Binomial name
- Evergestis umbrosalis (Fischer von Röslerstamm, 1842)

Synonyms
- Scopula umbrosalis Fischer v. Röslerstamm, 1842

Species of moth

Evergestis umbrosalis is a species of moth in the family Crambidae. It is found in Spain, Turkey, Greece, Ukraine and European Russia.

The wingspan is 30–33 mm. In Turkey, adults have been recorded on wing at the beginning of May. In the Sierra Nevada they have been recorded at the beginning of July.
