= Evergestis brunnea =

Scientific classification
- Domain: Eukaryota
- Kingdom: Animalia
- Phylum: Arthropoda
- Class: Insecta
- Order: Lepidoptera
- Family: Crambidae
- Genus: Evergestis
- Species: E. brunnea

Binomial name
- Evergestis brunnea Munroe, 1959

Species of moth

Evergestis brunnea is a moth in the family Crambidae. It is found in Peru.
