= Evergestis antofagastalis =

Scientific classification
- Kingdom: Animalia
- Phylum: Arthropoda
- Class: Insecta
- Order: Lepidoptera
- Family: Crambidae
- Genus: Evergestis
- Species: E. antofagastalis

Binomial name
- Evergestis antofagastalis Munroe, 1959

Species of moth

Evergestis antofagastalis is a moth in the family Crambidae. It is found in Chile.
