= Evergestis osthelderi =

Scientific classification
- Domain: Eukaryota
- Kingdom: Animalia
- Phylum: Arthropoda
- Class: Insecta
- Order: Lepidoptera
- Family: Crambidae
- Genus: Evergestis
- Species: E. osthelderi

Binomial name
- Evergestis osthelderi (Schawerda, 1932)

Synonyms
- Phlyctaenodes osthelderi Schawerda, 1932

Species of moth

Evergestis osthelderi is a moth in the family Crambidae. It was described by Schawerda in 1932. It is found in Turkey.
