= Evergestis lichenalis =

Scientific classification
- Kingdom: Animalia
- Phylum: Arthropoda
- Class: Insecta
- Order: Lepidoptera
- Family: Crambidae
- Genus: Evergestis
- Species: E. lichenalis

Binomial name
- Evergestis lichenalis Hampson, 1900

Species of moth

Evergestis lichenalis is a moth in the family Crambidae. It was described by George Hampson in 1900. It is found in China (Inner Mongolia, Shanxi), Central Asia and Russia.
