= Evergestis aridalis =

Scientific classification
- Domain: Eukaryota
- Kingdom: Animalia
- Phylum: Arthropoda
- Class: Insecta
- Order: Lepidoptera
- Family: Crambidae
- Genus: Evergestis
- Species: E. aridalis

Binomial name
- Evergestis aridalis Barnes & McDunnough, 1914

Species of moth

Evergestis aridalis is a moth in the family Crambidae. It was described by William Barnes and James Halliday McDunnough in 1914. It is found in North America, where it has been recorded from California and Nevada.

The wingspan is about 27 mm. Adults are on wing from May to June and in August.
