= Evergestis vinctalis =

Scientific classification
- Domain: Eukaryota
- Kingdom: Animalia
- Phylum: Arthropoda
- Class: Insecta
- Order: Lepidoptera
- Family: Crambidae
- Genus: Evergestis
- Species: E. vinctalis

Binomial name
- Evergestis vinctalis Barnes & McDunnough, 1914

Species of moth

Evergestis vinctalis is a moth in the family Crambidae. It was described by William Barnes and James Halliday McDunnough in 1914. It is found in North America, where it has been recorded from Alberta, Arizona, British Columbia, California, Colorado, Kansas, Montana, Nevada, New Mexico, Texas and Wyoming.

The wingspan is about 26 mm. The forewings are pale olive brown, shaded with bluish grey. The hindwings are pale smoky, but slightly darker terminally. Adults have been recorded on wing from March to August.

== Subspecies ==
- Evergestis vinctalis vinctalis
- Evergestis vinctalis muricoloralis Munroe, 1974 (British Columbia)
