= Evergestis caesialis =

Scientific classification
- Domain: Eukaryota
- Kingdom: Animalia
- Phylum: Arthropoda
- Class: Insecta
- Order: Lepidoptera
- Family: Crambidae
- Genus: Evergestis
- Species: E. caesialis

Binomial name
- Evergestis caesialis (Herrich-Schaffer, 1849)

Synonyms
- Botys caesialis Herrich-Schaffer, 1849; Botys saxicolalis Mann, 1862; Evergestis caesialis comealis Amsel, 1961; Evergestis caesialis mellealis Zerny, 1936

Species of moth

Evergestis caesialis is a species of moth in the family Crambidae. It is found in Italy, Croatia, Bosnia and Herzegovina, Romania, Bulgaria, the Republic of Macedonia, Greece, Iran and North Africa, including Morocco.

The wingspan is 19–24 mm. In Europe, adults are on wing in August and in Morocco from mid-June to the end of July.

== Subspecies ==
- Evergestis caesialis caesialis
- Evergestis caesialis comealis Amsel, 1961 (Iran)
- Evergestis caesialis mellealis Zerny, 1936 (North Africa)
