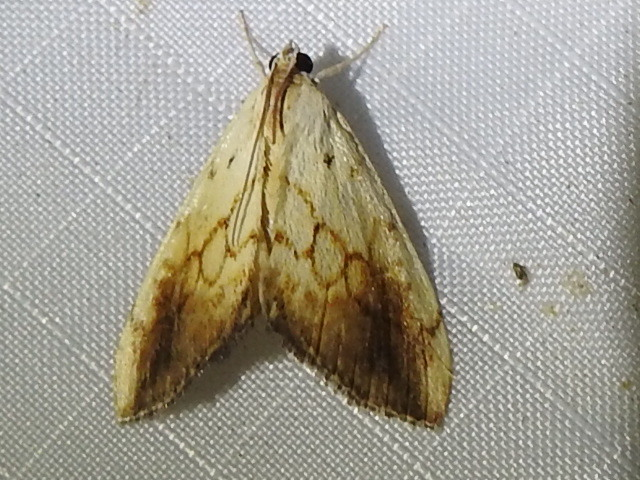

Scientific classification
- Domain: Eukaryota
- Kingdom: Animalia
- Phylum: Arthropoda
- Class: Insecta
- Order: Lepidoptera
- Family: Crambidae
- Genus: Evergestis
- Species: E. consimilis

Binomial name
- Evergestis consimilis Warren, 1892

= Evergestis consimilis =

Species of moth

Evergestis consimilis is a moth in the family Crambidae. It was described by Warren in 1892. It is found in North America, where it has been recorded from Arizona, California, Colorado and Texas. Adults are on wing from May to August.
