= Evergestis koepckei =

Scientific classification
- Kingdom: Animalia
- Phylum: Arthropoda
- Clade: Pancrustacea
- Class: Insecta
- Order: Lepidoptera
- Family: Crambidae
- Genus: Evergestis
- Species: E. koepckei

Binomial name
- Evergestis koepckei Munroe, 1959

Species of moth

Evergestis koepckei is a moth in the family Crambidae. It is known from Peru.
