= Evergestis funalis =

Scientific classification
- Kingdom: Animalia
- Phylum: Arthropoda
- Clade: Pancrustacea
- Class: Insecta
- Order: Lepidoptera
- Family: Crambidae
- Genus: Evergestis
- Species: E. funalis

Binomial name
- Evergestis funalis (Grote, 1878)

Synonyms
- Aedis funalis Grote, 1878

Species of moth

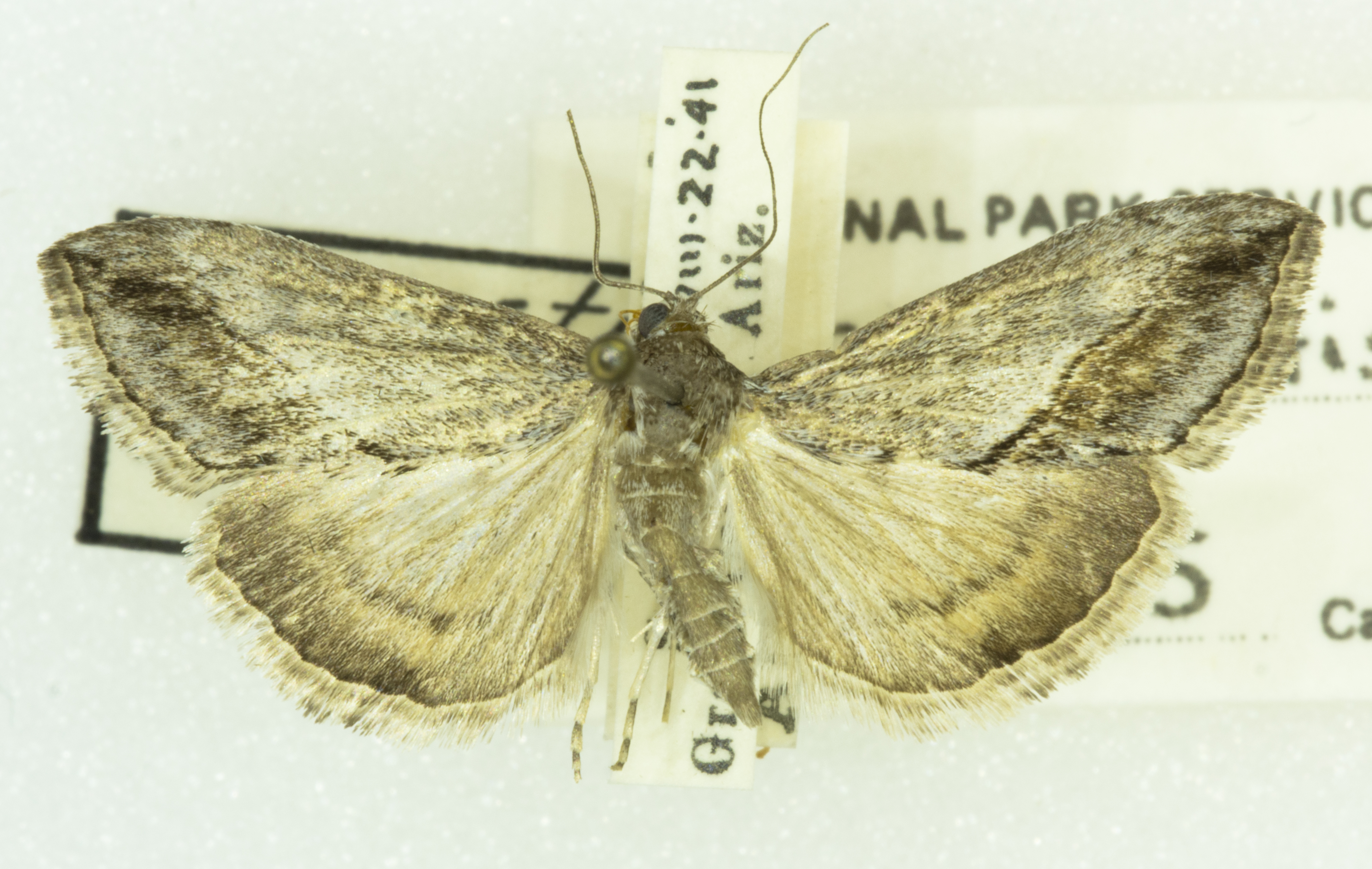
Evergrstis funalis, Arizona, US

Evergestis funalis is a moth in the family Crambidae. It was described by Augustus Radcliffe Grote in 1878. It is found in North America, where it has been recorded from Alaska, Arizona, British Columbia, California, Colorado, Nevada, Oregon, Utah and Washington.

The wingspan is 23–27 mm. Adults are on wing from May to October.

== Subspecies ==
- Evergestis funalis funalis
- Evergestis funalis angelina Munroe, 1974 (California)
- Evergestis funalis columbialis Munroe, 1974 (British Columbia)
- Evergestis funalis insulalis Barnes & McDunnough, 1914 (British Columbia: Vancouver Island)
- Evergestis funalis wallacensis Munroe, 1974 (Idaho)
