= Evergestis palousalis =

Scientific classification
- Domain: Eukaryota
- Kingdom: Animalia
- Phylum: Arthropoda
- Class: Insecta
- Order: Lepidoptera
- Family: Crambidae
- Genus: Evergestis
- Species: E. palousalis

Binomial name
- Evergestis palousalis Munroe, 1974

Synonyms
- Evergestis obscuralis obscuralis Barnes & McDunnough, 1914 (preocc. Hampson, 1912); Evergestis obscuralis

Species of moth

Evergestis palousalis is a moth in the family Crambidae. It was described by Eugene G. Munroe in 1974. It is found in North America, where it has been recorded from Alberta, British Columbia, California, Colorado, Nevada, Oregon and Utah.
