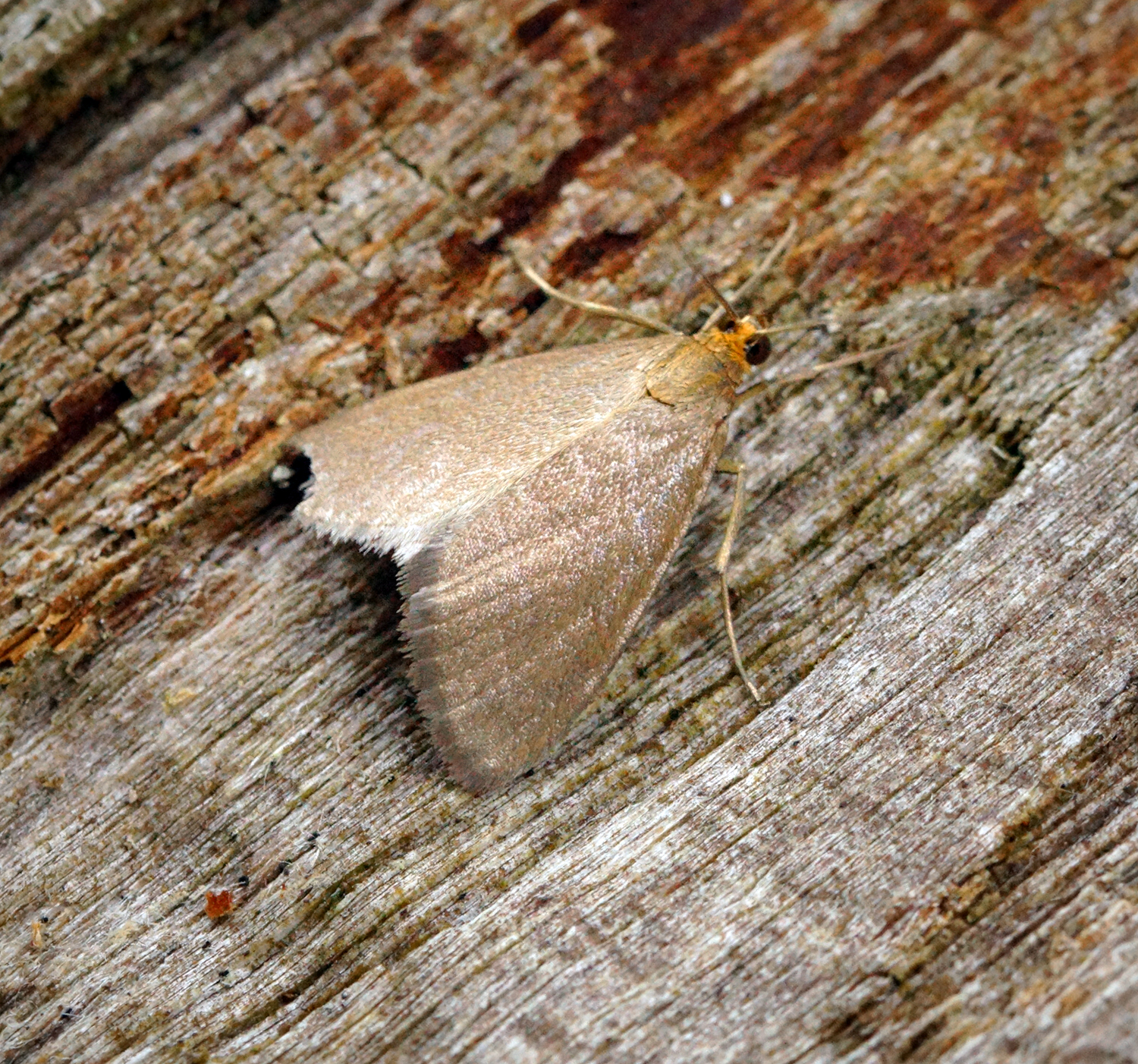

Scientific classification
- Kingdom: Animalia
- Phylum: Arthropoda
- Clade: Pancrustacea
- Class: Insecta
- Order: Lepidoptera
- Family: Crambidae
- Genus: Evergestis
- Species: E. aenealis

Binomial name
- Evergestis aenealis (Denis & Schiffermüller, 1775)

Synonyms
- Pyralis aenealis Denis & Schiffermuller, 1775; Evergestis aenealis dimorphalis Osthelder, 1938; Evergestis aenealis ab. obscurialis Verity, 1904; Homochroa mitralis Hübner, 1825; Evergestis aenealis obscura Toll, 1948; Pyralis furvalis Hübner, 1796; Pyralis rufimitralis Hübner, 1796

= Evergestis aenealis =

Species of moth

Evergestis aenealis is a species of moth in the family Crambidae. It is found in most of Europe, except Ireland, Great Britain, the Benelux, Portugal, Slovenia and Ukraine.

The wingspan is 24 to 28 millimetres (0.94 to 1.10 in). Adults are on wing from April to August in two generations per year.

The larvae feed on Brassicaceae species.
