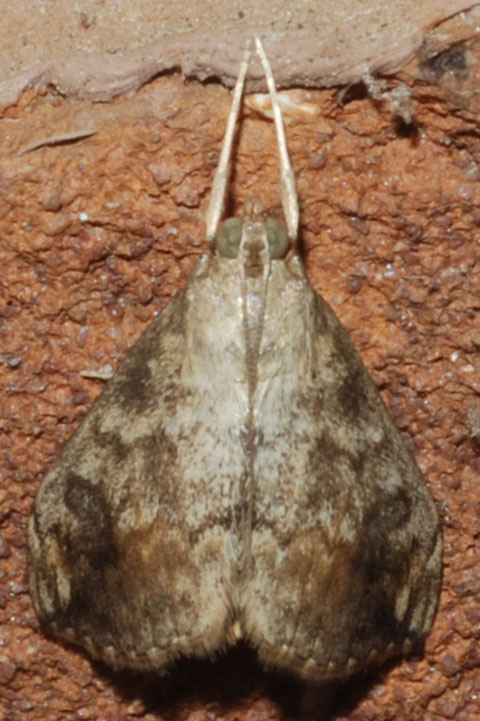

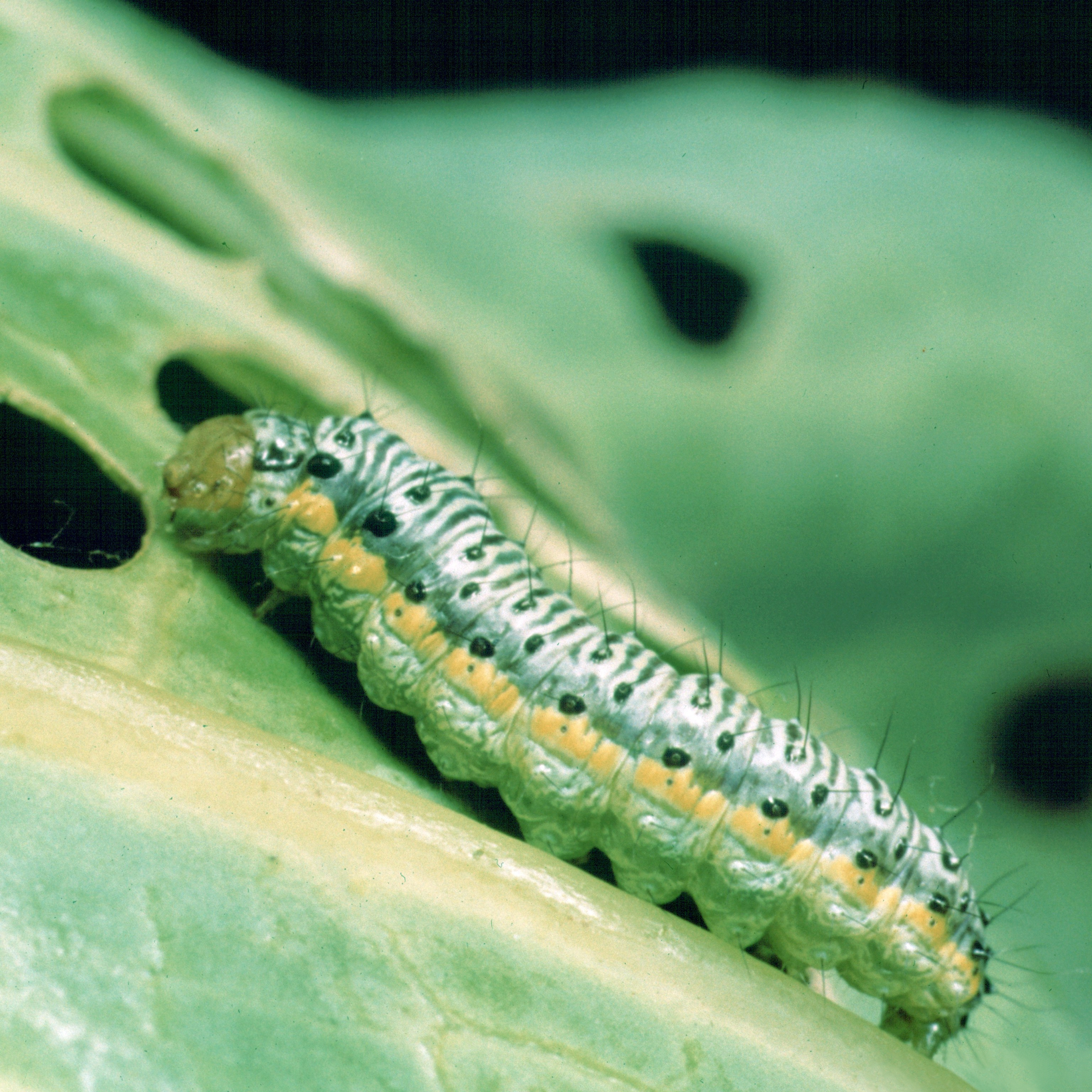
- Adult (top) and larva (bottom)

Scientific classification
- Kingdom: Animalia
- Phylum: Arthropoda
- Class: Insecta
- Order: Lepidoptera
- Family: Crambidae
- Subfamily: Glaphyriinae
- Genus: Evergestis
- Species: E. rimosalis

Binomial name
- Evergestis rimosalis (Guenée, 1854)

Synonyms
- Pionea rimosalis Guenée, 1854

= Evergestis rimosalis =

Species of moth

Evergestis rimosalis, commonly known as the cross-striped cabbageworm, is a species of moth in the family Crambidae. It is found in most of the eastern United States.

The wingspan is about 25 mm.
