= Evergestis anartalis =

Scientific classification
- Domain: Eukaryota
- Kingdom: Animalia
- Phylum: Arthropoda
- Class: Insecta
- Order: Lepidoptera
- Family: Crambidae
- Genus: Evergestis
- Species: E. anartalis

Binomial name
- Evergestis anartalis (Staudinger, 1892)

Synonyms
- Hercyna anartalis Staudinger, 1892; Maelinoptera anartalis; Noctuelia anartalis Hampson, 1918; Evergestis heliacalis Zerny, 1914

Species of moth

Evergestis anartalis is a moth in the family Crambidae. It was described by Otto Staudinger in 1892. It is found in Uzbekistan, Kazakhstan, Kyrgyzstan and China.

Adults are on wing from mid-June to mid-July.
