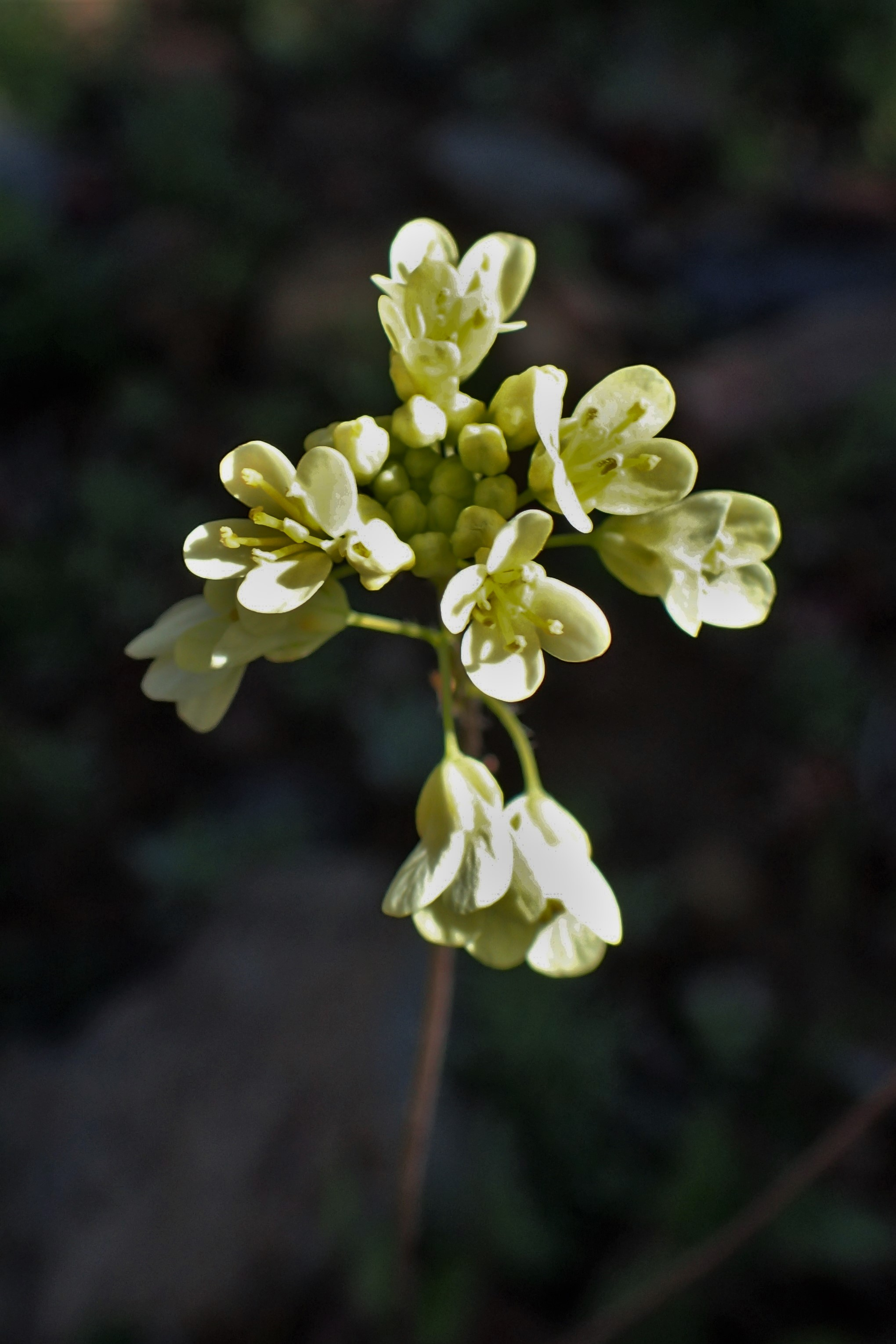

Scientific classification
- Kingdom: Plantae
- Clade: Embryophytes
- Clade: Tracheophytes
- Clade: Spermatophytes
- Clade: Angiosperms
- Clade: Eudicots
- Clade: Rosids
- Order: Brassicales
- Family: Brassicaceae
- Genus: Biscutella
- Species: B. didyma

Binomial name
- Biscutella didyma L.

Synonyms
- Biscutella apula L.; Biscutella didyma var. apula Coss.; Clypeola didyma (L.) Crantz

= Biscutella didyma =

Species of plant

Biscutella didyma, commonly known as buckler mustard, is a species of annual herb in the family Brassicaceae.

Individuals can grow to 4 cm. They have a self-supporting growth form and simple, broad leaves and dry fruit. Flowers are visited by nomad bees, syrphid flies, the hoverfly Chrysotoxum intermedium, and the fly Hebecnema fumosa.
