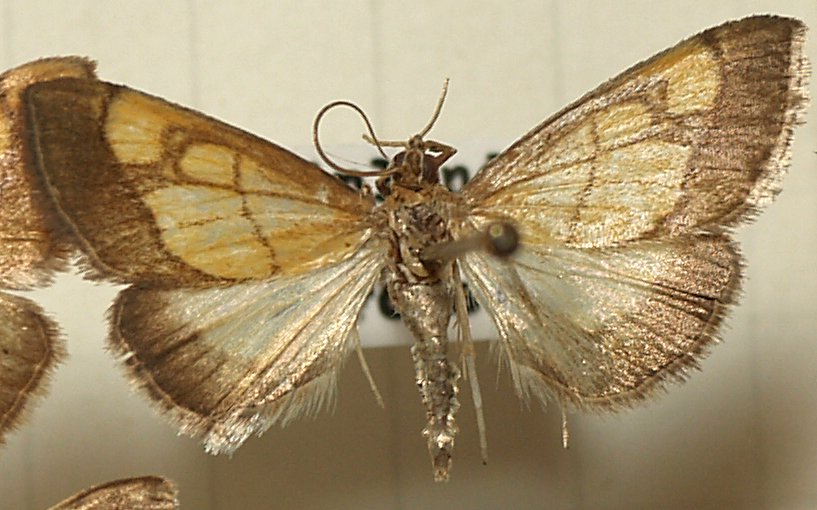

Scientific classification
- Kingdom: Animalia
- Phylum: Arthropoda
- Class: Insecta
- Order: Lepidoptera
- Family: Crambidae
- Genus: Evergestis
- Species: E. limbata

Binomial name
- Evergestis limbata (Linnaeus, 1767)

Synonyms
- Phalaena Geometra limbata Linnaeus, 1767; Evergestis limbata delimbata Osthelder, 1940; Mesographe praetextalis Hübner, 1825; Pionea limbalis Guenée, 1854

= Evergestis limbata =

Species of moth

Evergestis limbata is a species of moth of the family Crambidae first described by Carl Linnaeus in 1767. It is found in Europe.

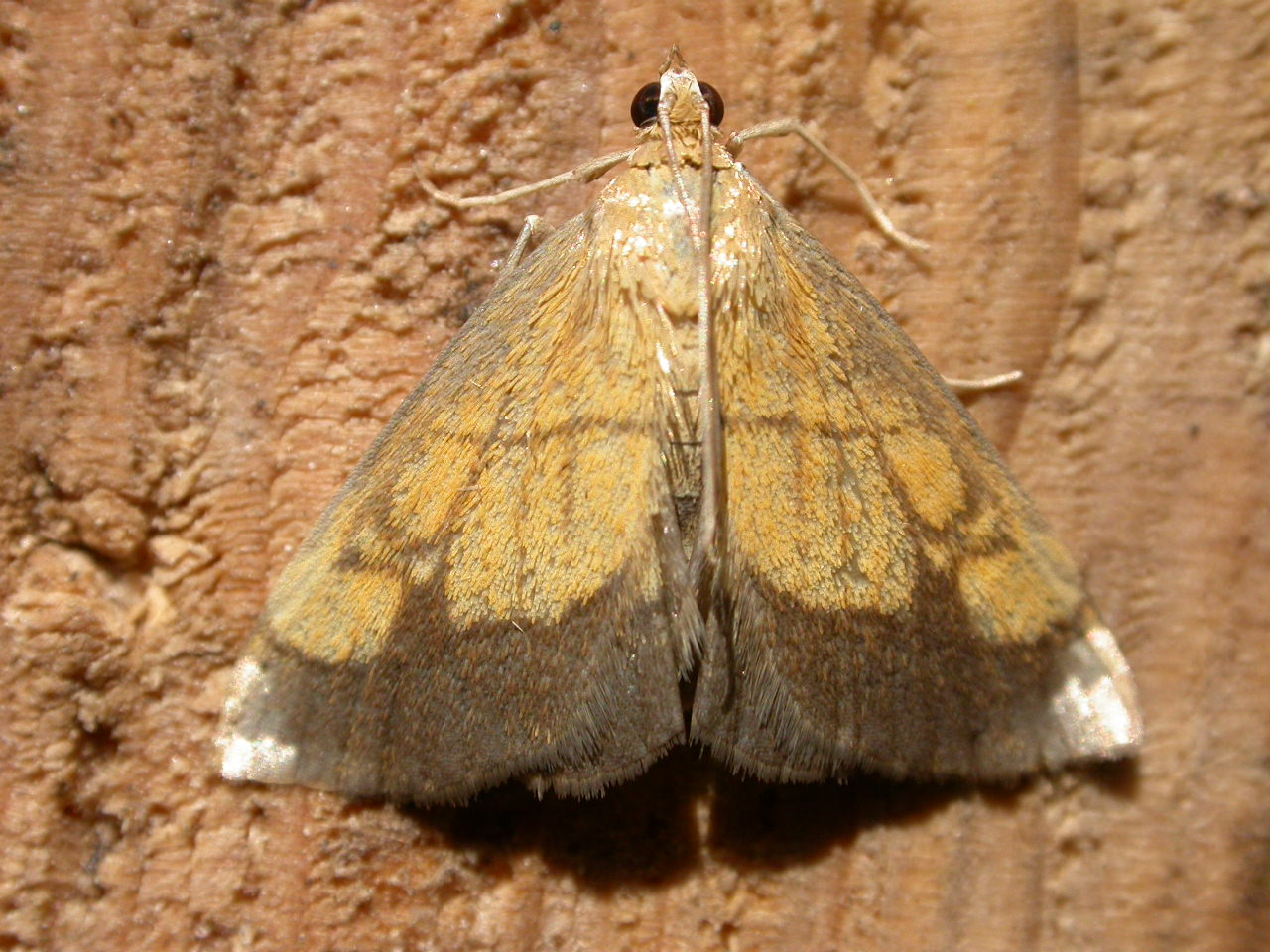

The wingspan is 20–23 mm. The moth flies from June to August depending on the location.

The larvae feed on Brassicaceae species, such as garlic mustard (Alliaria petiolata) and hedge mustard (Sisymbrium officinale).
