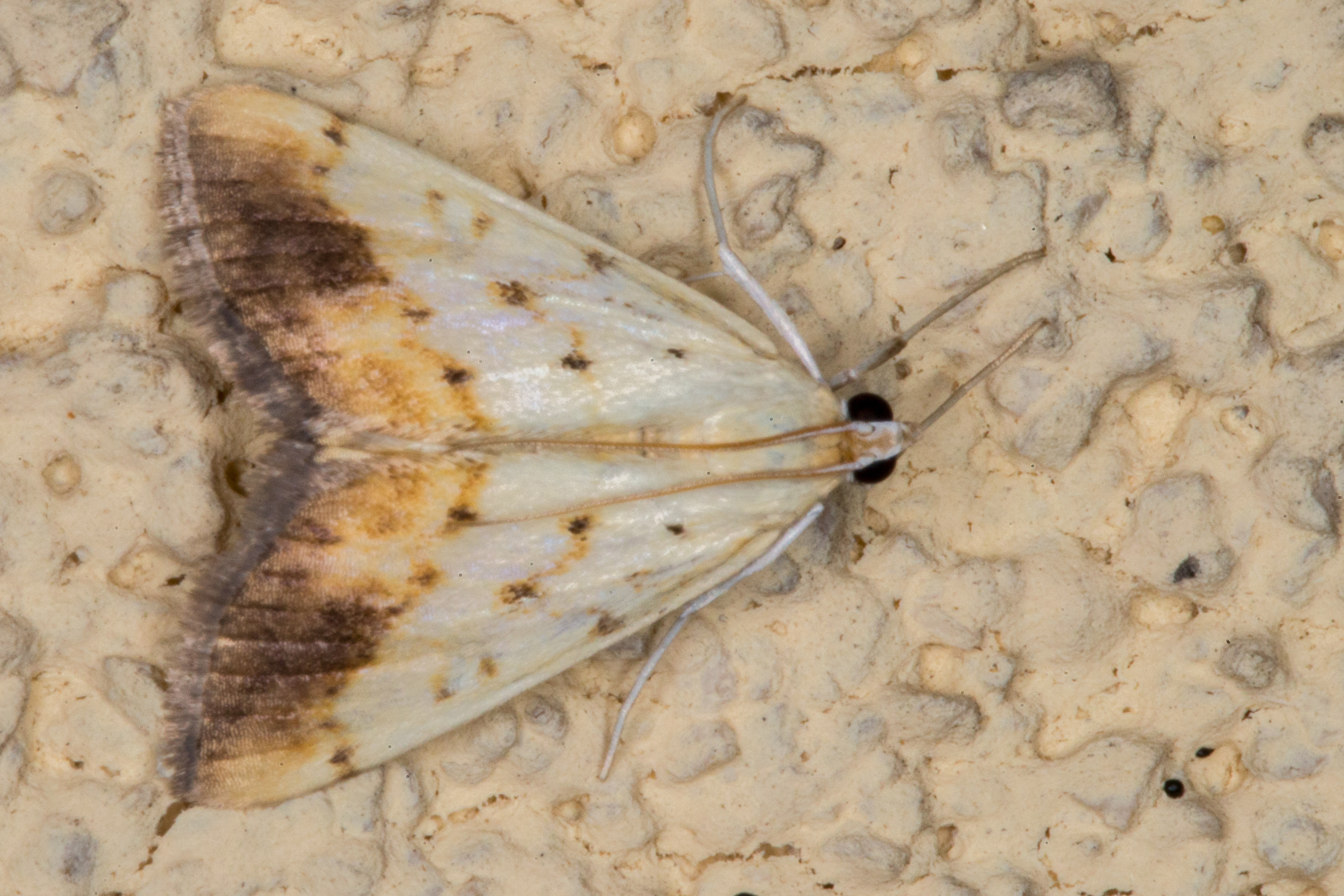
- Evergestis extimalis in Łódź, Poland

Scientific classification
- Domain: Eukaryota
- Kingdom: Animalia
- Phylum: Arthropoda
- Class: Insecta
- Order: Lepidoptera
- Family: Crambidae
- Genus: Evergestis
- Species: E. extimalis

Binomial name
- Evergestis extimalis (Scopoli, 1763)

Synonyms
- List: Phalaena extimalis Scopoli, 1763; Evergestis extimalis var. pallicilialis Fuchs, 1900; Phalaena flavofusca Retzius, 1783; Phalaena Tinea mediella Goeze, 1783; Pyralis erucalis Hübner, 1796; Pyralis margaritalis Denis & Schiffermüller, 1775; Tinea intermediata Fourcroy, 1785

= Evergestis extimalis =

Species of moth

Evergestis extimalis is a species of moth of the family Crambidae. It is found in the Palearctic.

The wingspan is 27–31 mm. The forewings are pale ochreous-yellow, darker terminally; lines and discal spot hardly darker, marked with a few fuscous dots; a brown terminal suffusion, more or less strongly dilated towards middle;cilia fuscous. Hindwings prismatic yellow -whitish; termen yellower, brownish-tinged. The larva is pale yellow; dorsal line darker; lateral pale purple; spots on lateral line black; head black.

The moth flies from June to September depending on the location.

The larvae feed on Brassicaceae species preferring the seed-heads.
