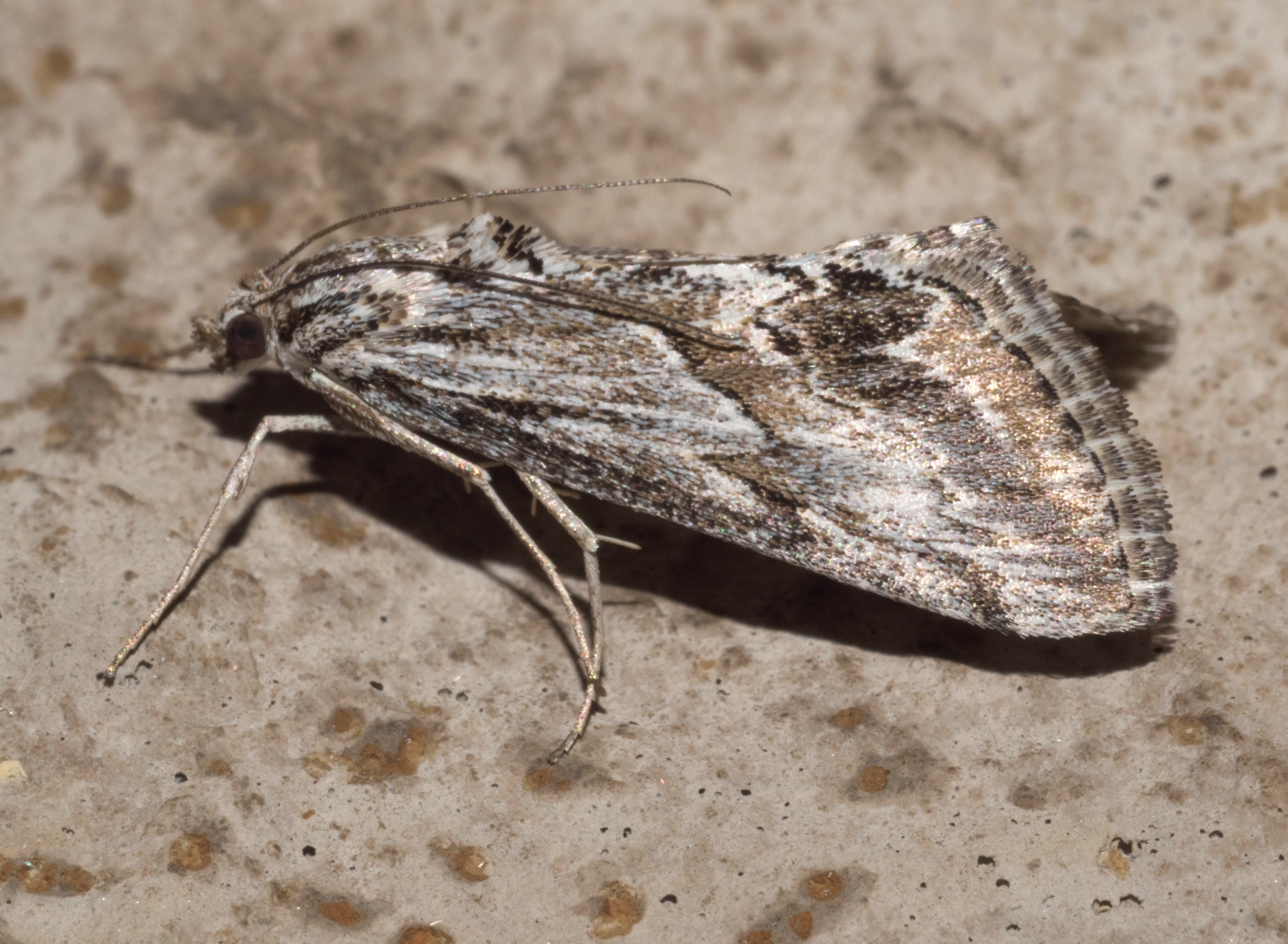
- Evergestis simulatilis, Wyoming

Scientific classification
- Kingdom: Animalia
- Phylum: Arthropoda
- Class: Insecta
- Order: Lepidoptera
- Family: Crambidae
- Genus: Evergestis
- Species: E. simulatilis

Binomial name
- Evergestis simulatilis (Grote, 1880)

Synonyms
- Aedis simulatilis Grote, 1880; Mesographe simulatilis; Prorasea brunneogrisea H. Edwards, 1886

= Evergestis simulatilis =

Species of moth

Evergestis simulatilis is a moth in the family Crambidae. It was described by Augustus Radcliffe Grote in 1880. It is found in North America, where it has been recorded from Alberta, Arizona, British Columbia, California, Colorado, Montana, Nevada and New Mexico.

The wingspan is about 26 mm. The forewings are shaded with white and brown. The hindwings are silvery drab with a darker margin. Adults have been recorded on wing from March to April and from June to October.
