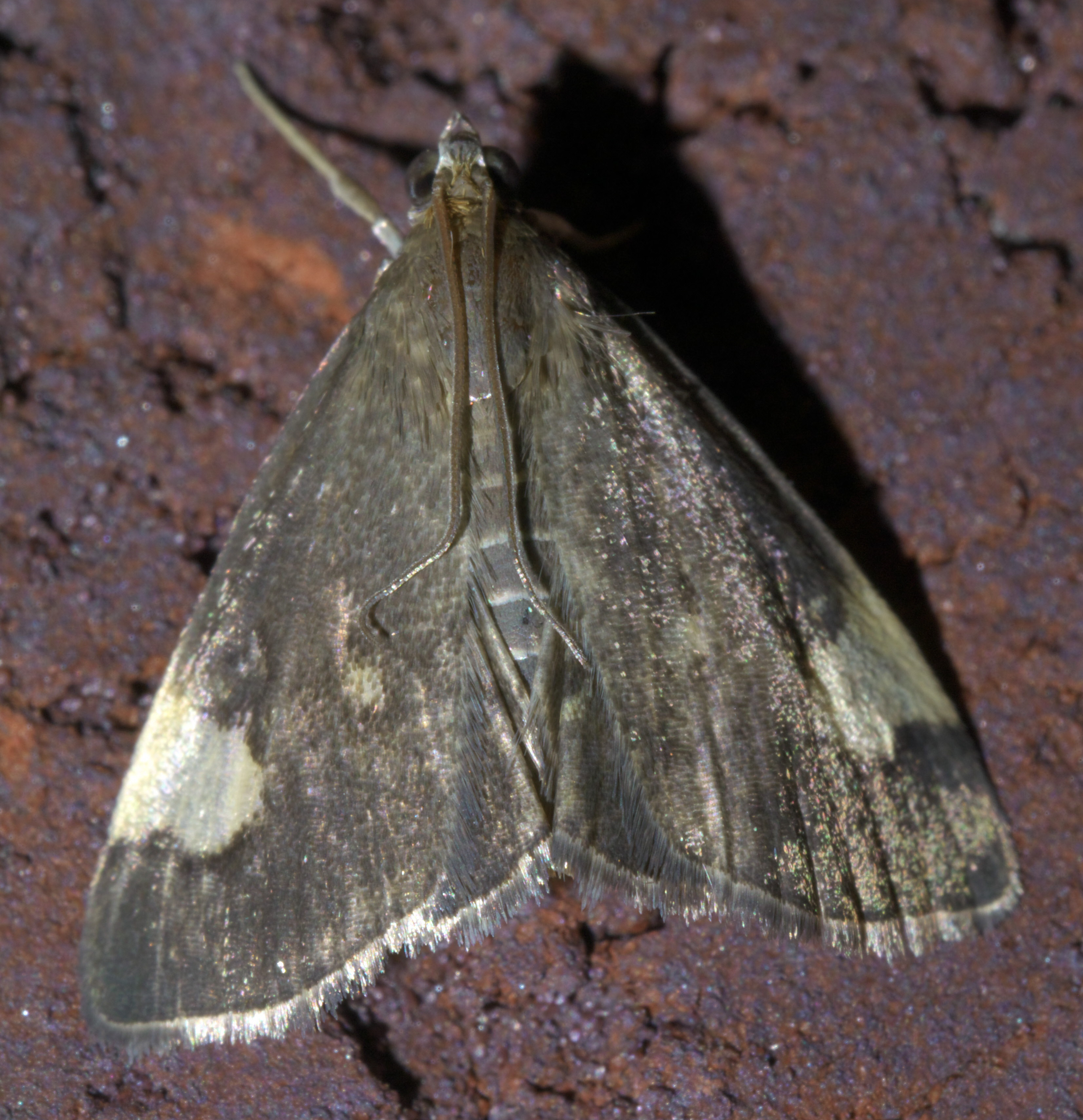

Scientific classification
- Kingdom: Animalia
- Phylum: Arthropoda
- Class: Insecta
- Order: Lepidoptera
- Family: Crambidae
- Genus: Evergestis
- Species: E. unimacula

Binomial name
- Evergestis unimacula (Grote & Robinson, 1867)

Synonyms
- Asopia unimacula Grote & Robinson, 1867

= Evergestis unimacula =

Species of moth

Evergestis unimacula, the large-spotted evergestis moth, is a moth in the family Crambidae. It was described by Augustus Radcliffe Grote and Coleman Townsend Robinson in 1867. It is found in North America, where it has been recorded from Georgia, Illinois, Indiana, Iowa, Maryland, Michigan, North Carolina, Ohio, Oklahoma, Ontario, Pennsylvania, Quebec, Tennessee and West Virginia. Outliers have been recorded from Florida.

== Etymology ==
The species name is derived from Latin unimacula (meaning one spot).
