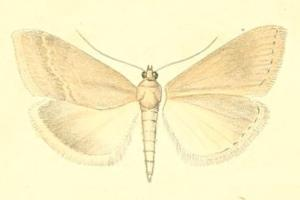

Scientific classification
- Domain: Eukaryota
- Kingdom: Animalia
- Phylum: Arthropoda
- Class: Insecta
- Order: Lepidoptera
- Family: Crambidae
- Genus: Evergestis
- Species: E. subfuscalis

Binomial name
- Evergestis subfuscalis (Staudinger, 1871)

Synonyms
- Botys (Orobena) subfuscalis Staudinger, 1871

= Evergestis subfuscalis =

Species of moth

Evergestis subfuscalis is a species of moth in the family Crambidae. It is found in Bulgaria, the Republic of Macedonia, Greece, Turkey and Syria.

The wingspan is 23–28 mm. There are probably two generations per year. Adults are on wing in summer.

== Subspecies ==
- Evergestis subfuscalis subfuscalis
- Evergestis subfuscalis pallidalis Zerny, 1934 (Syria)
