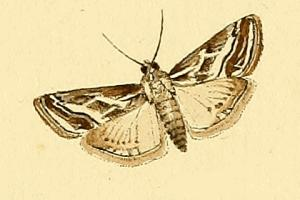

Scientific classification
- Kingdom: Animalia
- Phylum: Arthropoda
- Clade: Pancrustacea
- Class: Insecta
- Order: Lepidoptera
- Family: Crambidae
- Genus: Evergestis
- Species: E. desertalis

Binomial name
- Evergestis desertalis (Hubner, 1813)

Synonyms
- Pyralis desertalis Hubner, 1813; Botys vandalusialis Herrich-Schäffer, 1855; Noctuelia avicennae Tams, 1925

= Evergestis desertalis =

Species of moth

Evergestis desertalis is a species of moth in the family Crambidae described by Jacob Hübner in 1813. It is found in Spain, Romania, Bulgaria, Ukraine (Crimea), south-eastern Russia, on Sicily, Malta and Crete, Arabia and North Africa, including Algeria and Tunisia.

The wingspan is about 27 mm. There are two or more generations per year with adults on wing from May to October.
