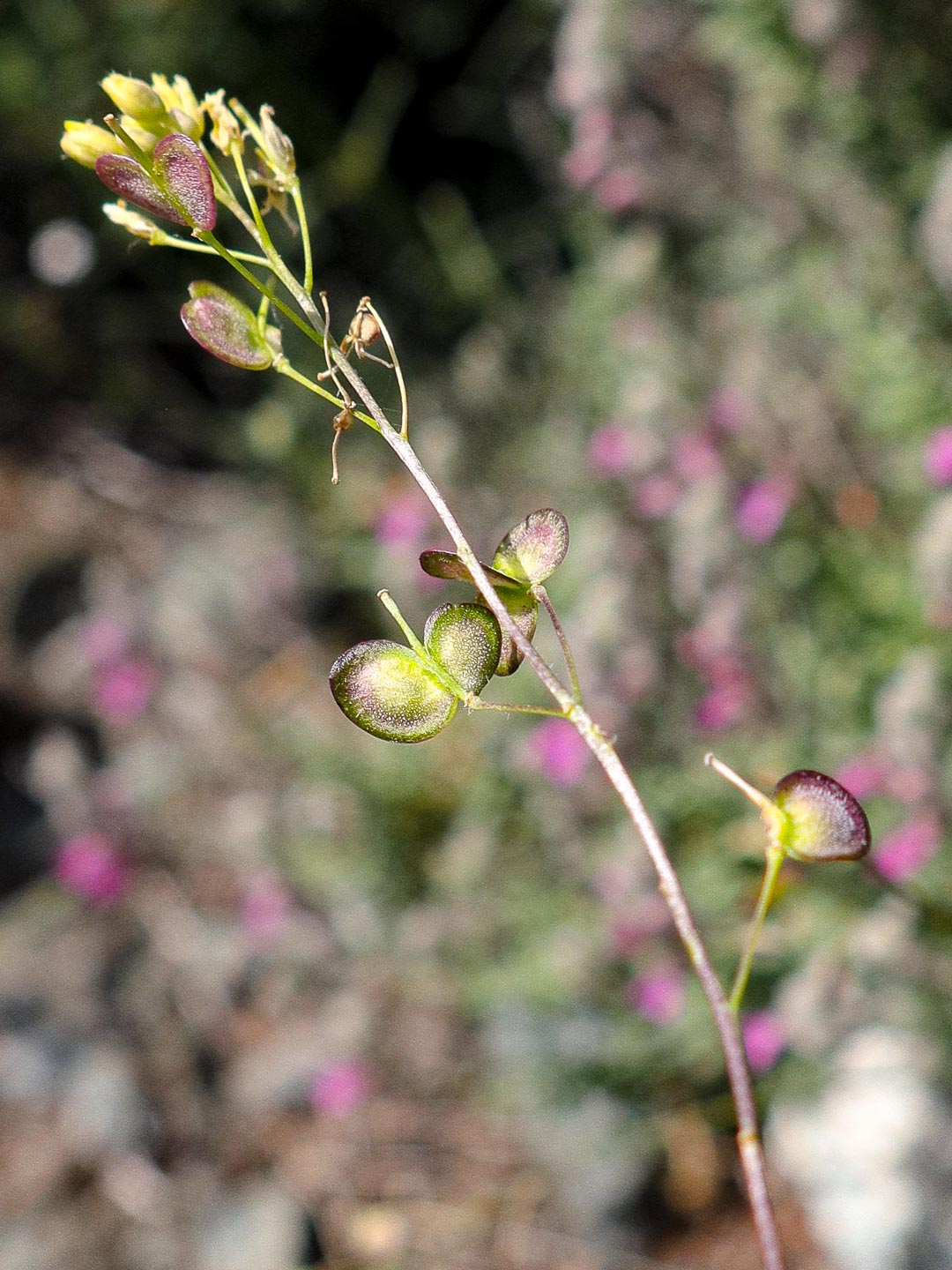

Conservation status
- Critically Endangered (IUCN 3.1)

Scientific classification
- Kingdom: Plantae
- Clade: Embryophytes
- Clade: Tracheophytes
- Clade: Angiosperms
- Clade: Eudicots
- Clade: Rosids
- Order: Brassicales
- Family: Brassicaceae
- Genus: Biscutella
- Species: B. rotgesii

Binomial name
- Biscutella rotgesii Foucaud

= Biscutella rotgesii =

Species of flowering plant

Biscutella rotgesii is a species of flowering plant in the family Brassicaceae. It is found only in Corsica, France. Its natural habitat is Mediterranean-type shrubby vegetation. It is threatened by habitat loss.
