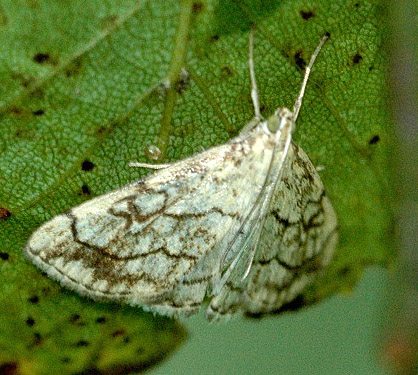

Scientific classification
- Kingdom: Animalia
- Phylum: Arthropoda
- Clade: Pancrustacea
- Class: Insecta
- Order: Lepidoptera
- Family: Crambidae
- Genus: Evergestis
- Species: E. pallidata

Binomial name
- Evergestis pallidata (Hufnagel, 1811)

Synonyms
- Phalaena pallidata Hufnagel, 1767; Pyralis elutalis Hübner, 1796; Pionea eunusalis Walker, 1859; Pyralis straminalis Hübner, 1793

= Evergestis pallidata =

Species of moth

Evergestis pallidata is a species of moth of the family Crambidae described by Johann Siegfried Hufnagel in 1811. It is found in Europe, across the Palearctic and in North America.

The wingspan is 24–29 mm. The ground colour of the front wings is a shiny yellow with brown-red transverse lines, stigmata and veins that create a mesh pattern. The hind wings are dazzlingly white with some incomplete brown lines. The moth flies from June to September depending on the location.

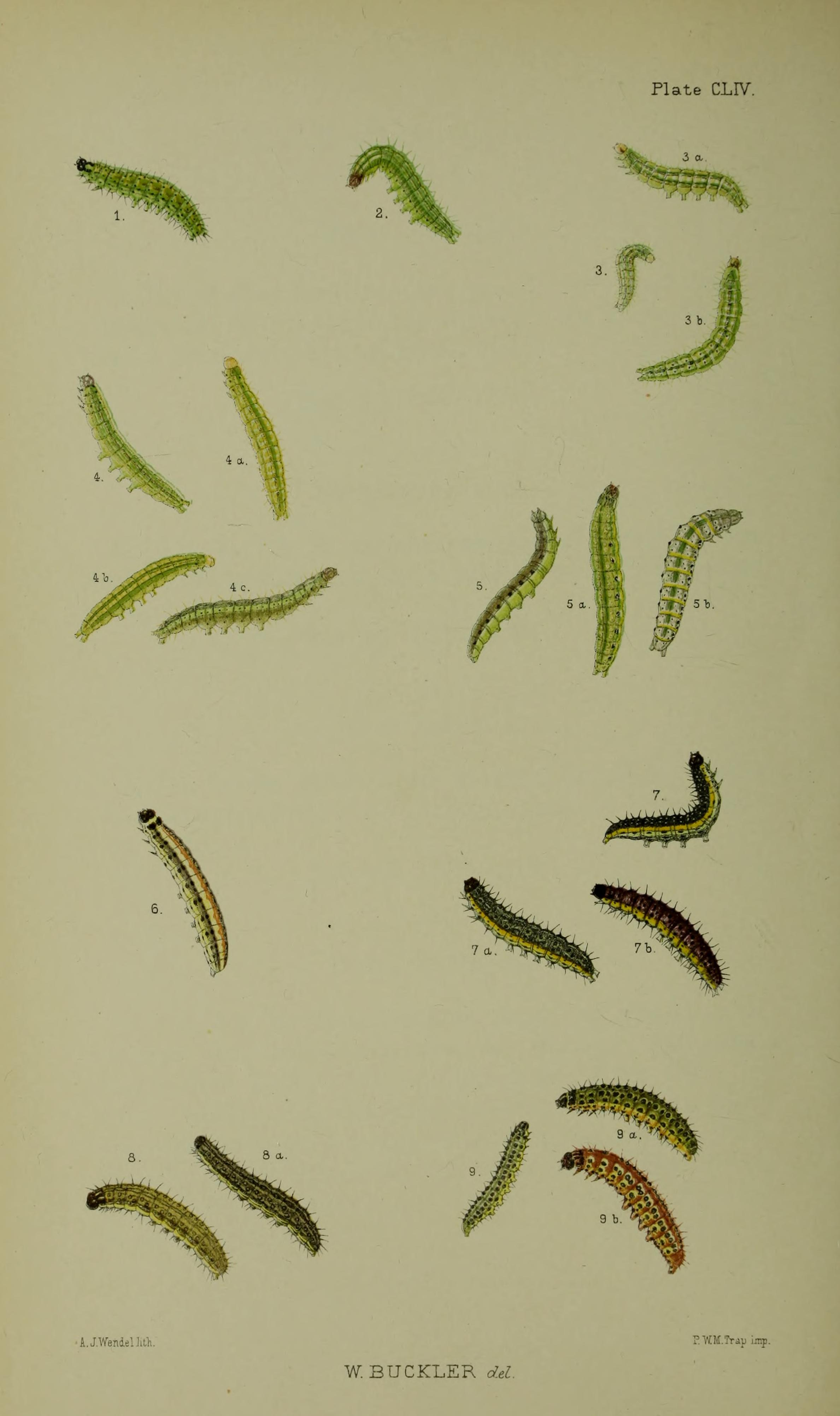
Figs.7, 7a, 7b larva after final moult

The larvae feed on Brassicaceae species, especially Barbarea vulgaris.
