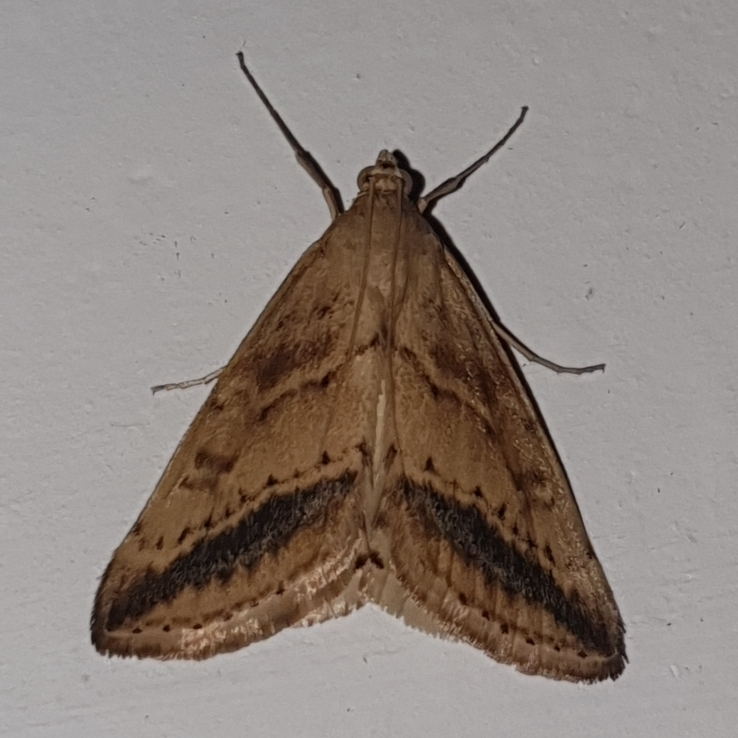

Scientific classification
- Domain: Eukaryota
- Kingdom: Animalia
- Phylum: Arthropoda
- Class: Insecta
- Order: Lepidoptera
- Family: Crambidae
- Genus: Evergestis
- Species: E. nomadalis

Binomial name
- Evergestis nomadalis (Lederer, 1870)

Synonyms
- Orobena nomadalis Lederer, 1871

= Evergestis nomadalis =

Species of moth

Evergestis nomadalis is a species of moth in the family Crambidae. It is found in Greece, Russia, Turkey, Turkmenistan and Iran.

The wingspan is 31–33 mm. Adults are on wing in late summer.
