= Evergestis dumerlei =

Scientific classification
- Domain: Eukaryota
- Kingdom: Animalia
- Phylum: Arthropoda
- Class: Insecta
- Order: Lepidoptera
- Family: Crambidae
- Genus: Evergestis
- Species: E. dumerlei

Binomial name
- Evergestis dumerlei Leraut, 2003

Species of moth

Evergestis dumerlei is a species of moth in the family Crambidae. It is found in France, Spain and North Africa, including Morocco.

The wingspan is 19–26 mm. Adults are on wing from the end of August to the beginning of October.
