= Evergestis placens =

Scientific classification
- Kingdom: Animalia
- Phylum: Arthropoda
- Class: Insecta
- Order: Lepidoptera
- Family: Crambidae
- Genus: Evergestis
- Species: E. placens

Binomial name
- Evergestis placens (Walker, [1866])

Synonyms
- Botys placens Walker, [1866]; Mimudea placens

Species of moth

Evergestis placens is a moth in the family Crambidae. It was described by Francis Walker in 1866.

== Distribution ==
It is found on Borneo.
