= Evergestis montis =

Scientific classification
- Domain: Eukaryota
- Kingdom: Animalia
- Phylum: Arthropoda
- Class: Insecta
- Order: Lepidoptera
- Family: Crambidae
- Genus: Evergestis
- Species: E. montis

Binomial name
- Evergestis montis Maes, 2011

Species of moth

Evergestis montis is a moth in the family Crambidae. It was described by Koen V. N. Maes in 2011. It is found in Cameroon.
