= Evergestis alborivulalis =

Scientific classification
- Domain: Eukaryota
- Kingdom: Animalia
- Phylum: Arthropoda
- Class: Insecta
- Order: Lepidoptera
- Family: Crambidae
- Genus: Evergestis
- Species: E. alborivulalis

Binomial name
- Evergestis alborivulalis (Eversmann, 1844)

Synonyms
- Ennychia alborivulalis Eversmann, 1844; Evergestis canalesialis Hampson, 1913

Species of moth

Evergestis alborivulalis is a species of moth in the family Crambidae. It is found in Spain, Bosnia and Herzegovina, Hungary, Slovakia, Bulgaria, Turkey, Ukraine and Russia. Outside of Europe, it is found in the Asian part of Turkey, the Ural, southern Siberia, east to the Baikal region. It is found in mountainous regions.

The wingspan is 13.5–20 mm (0.53–0.79 in). Adults are on wing from April to May.
