= Lepidoplaga =

Scientific classification
- Domain: Eukaryota
- Kingdom: Animalia
- Phylum: Arthropoda
- Class: Insecta
- Order: Lepidoptera
- Family: Crambidae
- Subfamily: Pyraustinae
- Genus: Lepidoplaga; Warren, 1895

Genus of moths

Lepidoplaga is a genus of moths of the family Crambidae.

== Species ==
- Lepidoplaga flavicinctalis (Snellen, 1890)
