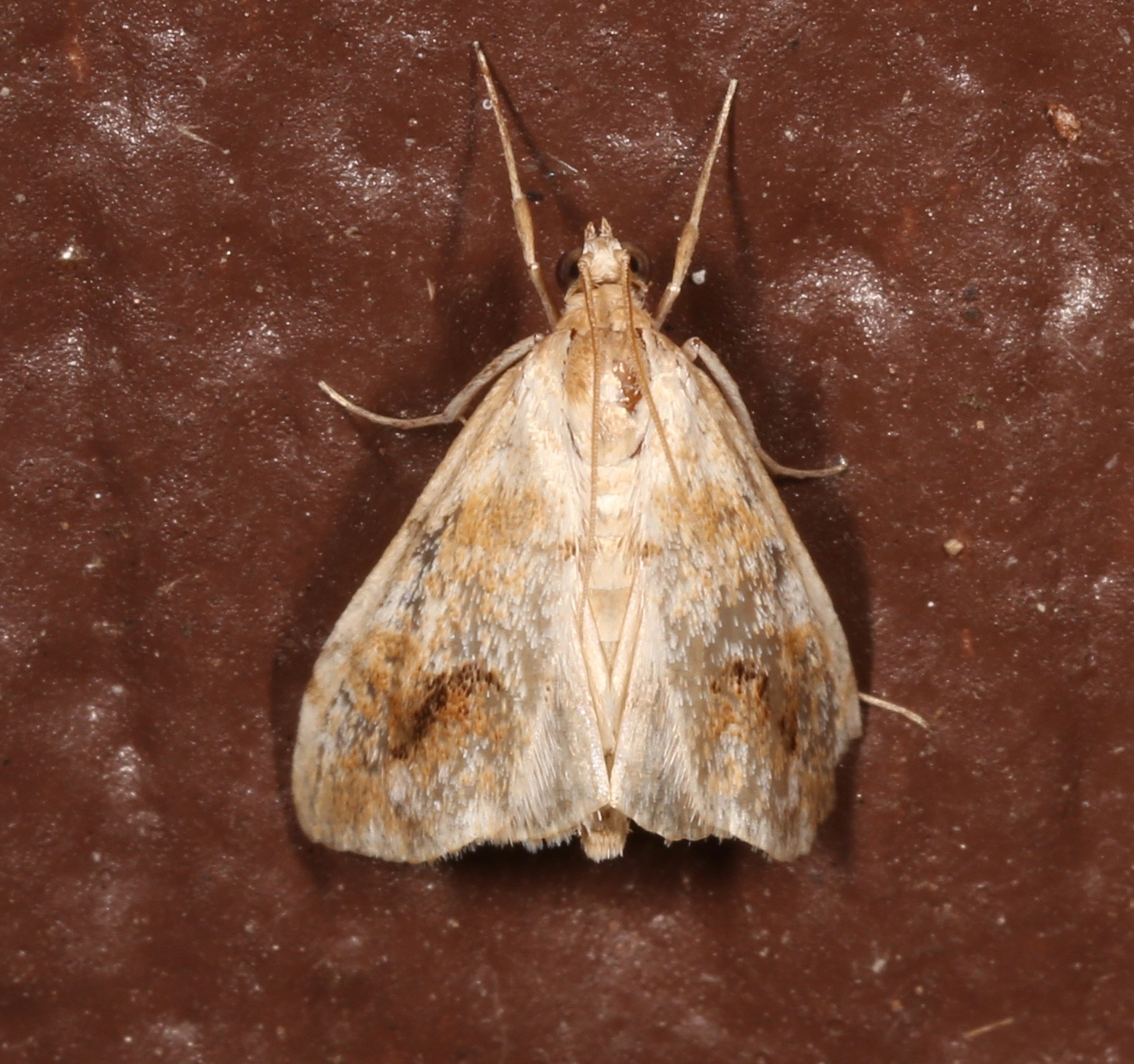

Scientific classification
- Domain: Eukaryota
- Kingdom: Animalia
- Phylum: Arthropoda
- Class: Insecta
- Order: Lepidoptera
- Family: Crambidae
- Genus: Evergestis
- Species: E. lunulalis

Binomial name
- Evergestis lunulalis Barnes & McDunnough, 1914

= Evergestis lunulalis =

Species of moth

Evergestis lunulalis is a moth in the family Crambidae. It was described by William Barnes and James Halliday McDunnough in 1914. It is found in North America, where it has been recorded from Arizona, New Mexico and Texas.
