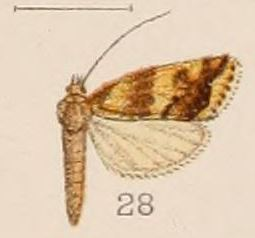
- Evergestis scopicalis (Hampson, 1908)

Scientific classification
- Kingdom: Animalia
- Phylum: Arthropoda
- Class: Insecta
- Order: Lepidoptera
- Family: Crambidae
- Genus: Evergestis
- Species: E. scopicalis

Binomial name
- Evergestis scopicalis (Hampson, 1908)

Synonyms
- Pionea scopicalis Hampson, 1908

= Evergestis scopicalis =

Species of moth

Evergestis scopicalis is a moth in the family Crambidae. It was described by George Hampson in 1908. It is found in Sri Lanka.
