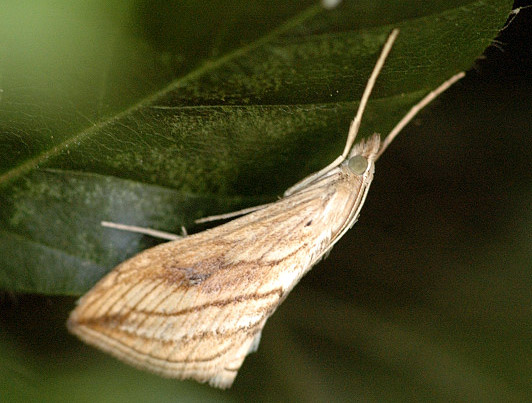

Scientific classification
- Kingdom: Animalia
- Phylum: Arthropoda
- Clade: Pancrustacea
- Class: Insecta
- Order: Lepidoptera
- Family: Crambidae
- Genus: Evergestis
- Species: E. forficalis

Binomial name
- Evergestis forficalis (Linnaeus, 1758)

Synonyms
- Phalaena orficalis Linnaeus, 1758; Crambus forficatus Fabricius, 1798; Phalaena trivialis Scopoli, 1763; Pionea sodalis Butler, 1878

= Evergestis forficalis =

Species of moth

Evergestis forficalis, the garden pebble, is a species of moth of the family Crambidae. It is found in Europe, the Palearctic and North America. The species was described by Carl Linnaeus in his 1758 10th edition of Systema Naturae

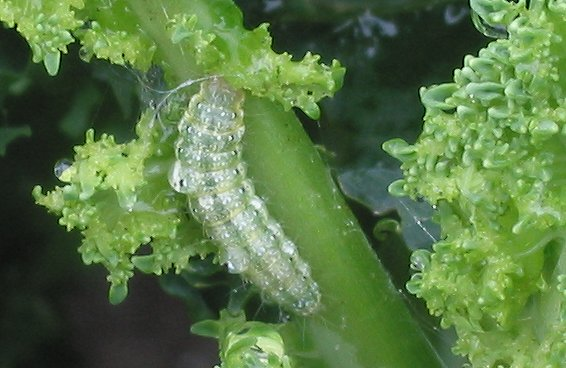
Caterpillar

The species closely resembles Rivula sericealis. The wingspan is 25–28 mm. The forewings are whitish-ochreous, disc and apex sometimes tinged with yellowish-brown; lines fine, dark brown, very obliquely curved, indented beneath costa, first very indistinct towards costa; two small transversely placed discal spots outlined with dark fuscous, lower larger; a dark fuscous oblique apical streak; margins of subterminal line obscurely brownish. The hindwings are ochreous- whitish with a grey posterior line. The larva is yellowish-green; dorsal and lateral lines darker green; head yellowish

The length of the forewings 12–14 mm. The moth flies from May to September depending on the location.

The larvae feed on Brassicaceae species, such as Brussels sprout and kale.
