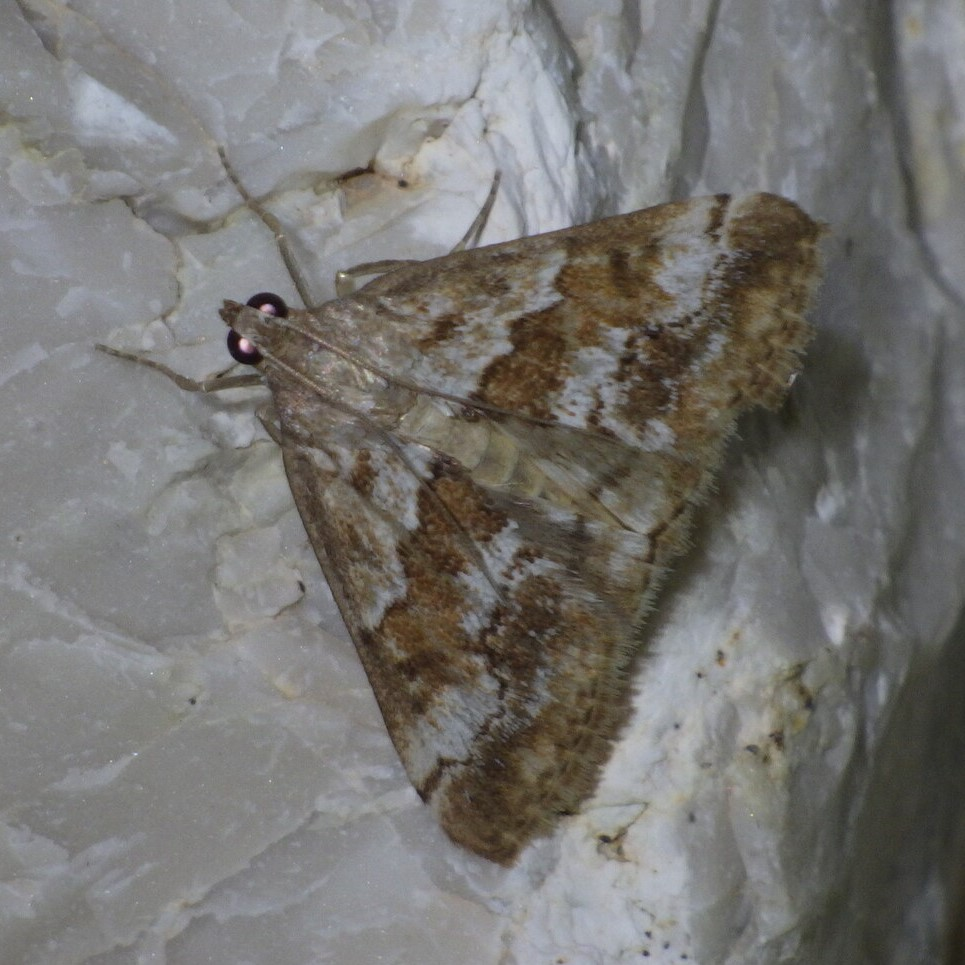

Scientific classification
- Kingdom: Animalia
- Phylum: Arthropoda
- Class: Insecta
- Order: Lepidoptera
- Family: Crambidae
- Genus: Evergestis
- Species: E. segetalis

Binomial name
- Evergestis segetalis (Herrich-Schaffer, 1851)

Synonyms
- Botys segetalis Herrich-Schaffer, 1851; Evergestis rubidalbalis Turati, 1907; Orobena blandalis Guenée, 1854

= Evergestis segetalis =

Species of moth

Evergestis segetalis is a species of moth in the family Crambidae. It is found in France, Italy, the Republic of Macedonia and Bulgaria. In the east, the range extends through European Russia, Turkey and Armenia to Iran. It is also present in North Africa.

The wingspan is about 26 mm. In North Africa, adults are on wing from June to August.
