= Evergestis plumbofascialis =

Scientific classification
- Domain: Eukaryota
- Kingdom: Animalia
- Phylum: Arthropoda
- Class: Insecta
- Order: Lepidoptera
- Family: Crambidae
- Genus: Evergestis
- Species: E. plumbofascialis

Binomial name
- Evergestis plumbofascialis (Ragonot, 1894)

Synonyms
- Orobena plumbofascialis Ragonot, 1894

Species of moth

Evergestis plumbofascialis is a species of moth in the family Crambidae. It is found in Spain.

The wingspan is about 25 millimetres (1 in).
