= Evergestis insiola =

Scientific classification
- Kingdom: Animalia
- Phylum: Arthropoda
- Class: Insecta
- Order: Lepidoptera
- Family: Crambidae
- Genus: Evergestis
- Species: E. insiola

Binomial name
- Evergestis insiola (Dyar, 1925)

Synonyms
- Pionea insiola Dyar, 1925

Species of moth

Evergestis insiola is a moth in the family Crambidae. It was described by Harrison Gray Dyar Jr. in 1925. It is found in Mexico.
