= Evergestis inglorialis =

Scientific classification
- Kingdom: Animalia
- Phylum: Arthropoda
- Class: Insecta
- Order: Lepidoptera
- Family: Crambidae
- Genus: Evergestis
- Species: E. inglorialis

Binomial name
- Evergestis inglorialis Hampson, 1918

Species of moth

Evergestis inglorialis is a moth in the family Crambidae. It was described by George Hampson in 1918. It is found in Peru.
