= Evergestis albifasciaria =

Scientific classification
- Kingdom: Animalia
- Phylum: Arthropoda
- Clade: Pancrustacea
- Class: Insecta
- Order: Lepidoptera
- Family: Crambidae
- Genus: Evergestis
- Species: E. albifasciaria

Binomial name
- Evergestis albifasciaria Chen & Wang, 2013

Species of moth

Evergestis albifasciaria is a moth in the family Crambidae. It was described by Na Chen and Shu-Xia Wang in 2013. It is found in China (Gansu, Hebei, Inner Mongolia, Qinghai).

The wingspan is 22−28 mm.
