= Evergestis eurekalis =

Scientific classification
- Domain: Eukaryota
- Kingdom: Animalia
- Phylum: Arthropoda
- Class: Insecta
- Order: Lepidoptera
- Family: Crambidae
- Genus: Evergestis
- Species: E. eurekalis

Binomial name
- Evergestis eurekalis Barnes & McDunnough, 1914

Species of moth

Evergestis eurekalis is a moth in the family Crambidae. It was described by William Barnes and James Halliday McDunnough in 1914. It is found in North America, where it has been recorded from Arizona, California and Utah.
