= Evergestis aegyptiacalis =

Scientific classification
- Kingdom: Animalia
- Phylum: Arthropoda
- Clade: Pancrustacea
- Class: Insecta
- Order: Lepidoptera
- Family: Crambidae
- Genus: Evergestis
- Species: E. aegyptiacalis

Binomial name
- Evergestis aegyptiacalis Caradja, 1916

Species of moth

Evergestis aegyptiacalis is a species of moth in the family Crambidae. It was described by Aristide Caradja in 1916. It is found in Egypt. It was recorded from Fuerteventura in the Canary Islands in 2009.
