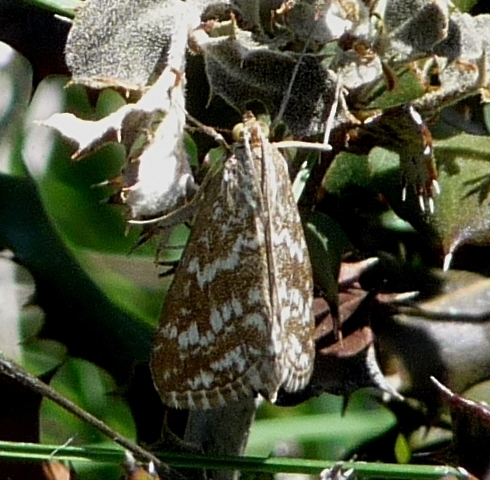

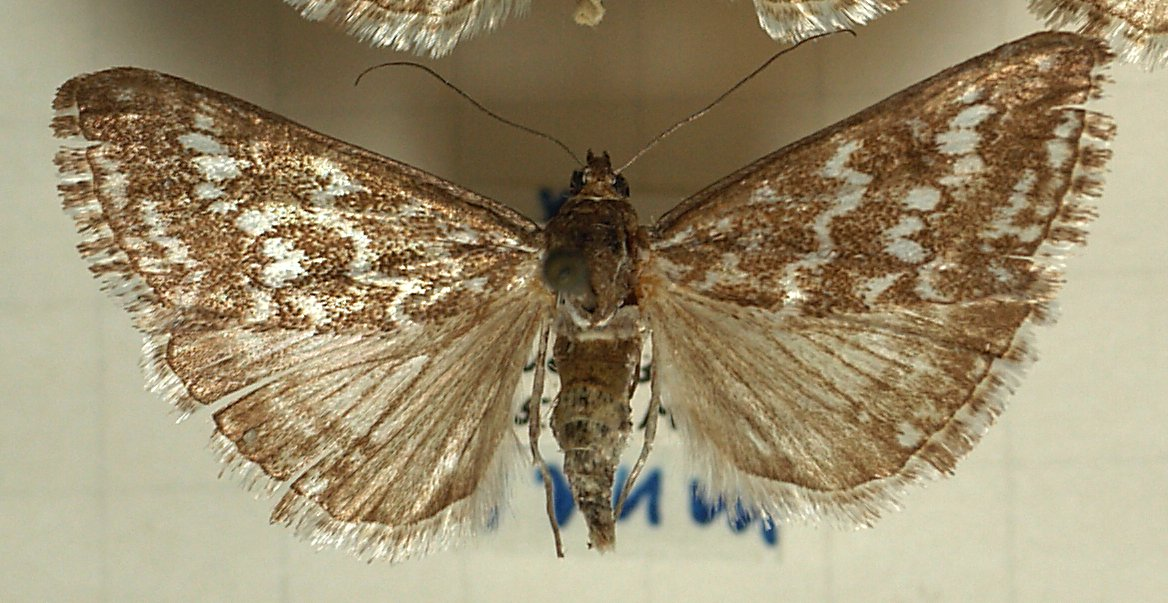

Scientific classification
- Kingdom: Animalia
- Phylum: Arthropoda
- Class: Insecta
- Order: Lepidoptera
- Family: Crambidae
- Genus: Evergestis
- Species: E. frumentalis

Binomial name
- Evergestis frumentalis (Linnaeus, 1761)

Synonyms
- Phalaena frumentalis Linnaeus, 1761; Botys frumentalis var. australis Bienert, 1869; Evergestis frumentalis var. espanalis Schawerda, 1926; Orobena frumentalis asiaticalis Ragonot, 1894; Orobena implicalis Guenée, 1854; Pyralis triquetralis Denis & Schiffermüller, 1775; Phalaena Pyralis secalis (Linnaeus, 1767)

= Evergestis frumentalis =

Species of moth

Evergestis frumentalis is a moth of the family Crambidae. It is found from the Iberian Peninsula through southern and central Europe and southern Fennoscandia to central Asia and southern Siberia. The species was first described by Carl Linnaeus in 1761.

The wingspan is 29–35 mm. There are two generations per year with adults on wing in April and August.

The larvae feed on Descourainia sophia, Sisymbrium, Sinapis (including S. arvensis) and Isatis (including I. tinctoria) species. The larvae of the second generation overwinter in a cocoon in the soil.
