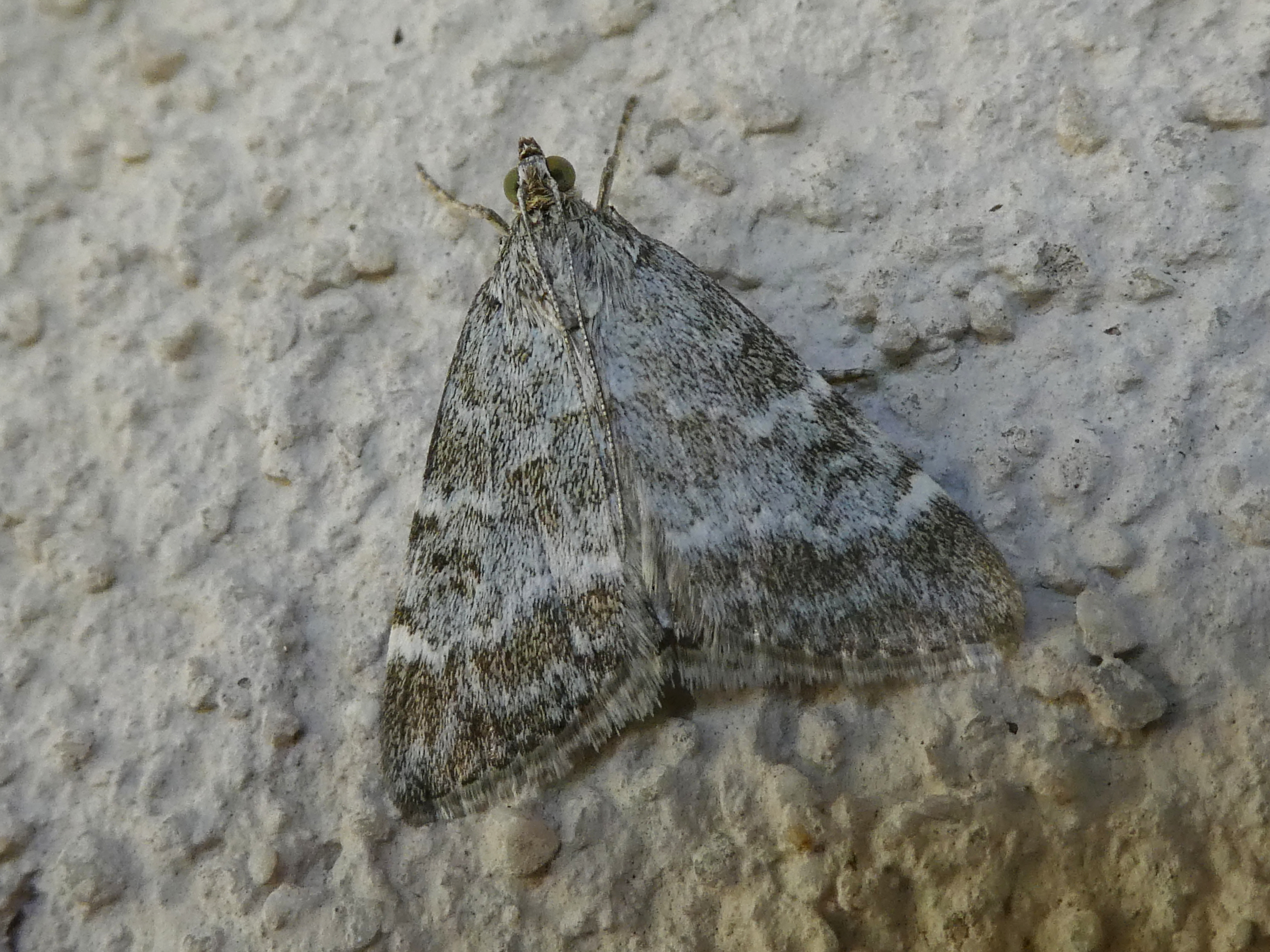

Scientific classification
- Kingdom: Animalia
- Phylum: Arthropoda
- Clade: Pancrustacea
- Class: Insecta
- Order: Lepidoptera
- Family: Crambidae
- Genus: Evergestis
- Species: E. sophialis

Binomial name
- Evergestis sophialis (Fabricius, 1787)

Synonyms
- Phalaena sophialis Fabricius, 1787; Evergestis sophialis ab. suffusa Skala, 1928; Phalaena variegalis Fabricius, 1787; Crambus sophiae Fabricius, 1798

= Evergestis sophialis =

Species of moth

Evergestis sophialis is a species of moth in the family Crambidae. It is found in large parts of Europe, except Ireland, Great Britain, the Benelux, Fennoscandia, the Baltic region and Hungary.

The wingspan is 21–24 mm. Adults are on wing from April to August.

The larvae feed on Sisymbrium sophia.
