= Evergestis triangulalis =

Scientific classification
- Domain: Eukaryota
- Kingdom: Animalia
- Phylum: Arthropoda
- Class: Insecta
- Order: Lepidoptera
- Family: Crambidae
- Genus: Evergestis
- Species: E. triangulalis

Binomial name
- Evergestis triangulalis Barnes & McDunnough, 1914

Species of moth

Evergestis triangulalis is a moth in the family Crambidae. It was described by William Barnes and James Halliday McDunnough in 1914. It is found in North America, where it has been recorded from Arizona, Nevada and New Mexico.

The wingspan is 26–30 mm. The forewings are whitish, scaled with brown in the basal and median area and suffused with dull red brown terminally. The hindwings are pale smoky hyaline (glass like), shaded with deep smoky on the outer margin. Adults have been recorded on wing from February to October.
