= Evergestis boursini =

Scientific classification
- Domain: Eukaryota
- Kingdom: Animalia
- Phylum: Arthropoda
- Class: Insecta
- Order: Lepidoptera
- Family: Crambidae
- Genus: Evergestis
- Species: E. boursini

Binomial name
- Evergestis boursini Amsel, 1939

Species of moth

Evergestis boursini is a moth in the family Crambidae. It was described by Hans Georg Amsel in 1939. It is found in Turkey.
