= Evergestis hordealis =

Scientific classification
- Domain: Eukaryota
- Kingdom: Animalia
- Phylum: Arthropoda
- Class: Insecta
- Order: Lepidoptera
- Family: Crambidae
- Genus: Evergestis
- Species: E. hordealis

Binomial name
- Evergestis hordealis Chrétien, 1915

Synonyms
- Orobena lambessalis Oberthür, 1922

Species of moth

Evergestis hordealis is a species of moth in the family Crambidae. It is found in North Africa.

The wingspan is 27–28 mm. Adults have been recorded on wing in September.
