= Evergestis pechi =

Scientific classification
- Domain: Eukaryota
- Kingdom: Animalia
- Phylum: Arthropoda
- Class: Insecta
- Order: Lepidoptera
- Family: Crambidae
- Genus: Evergestis
- Species: E. pechi

Binomial name
- Evergestis pechi (Bethune-Baker, 1885)

Synonyms
- Eurycreon pechi Bethune-Baker, 1885; Orobena renatalis Oberthür, 1887; Phlyctaenodes buckwelli D. Lucas, 1954

Species of moth

Evergestis pechi is a species of moth in the family Crambidae described by George Thomas Bethune-Baker in 1885. It is found in Spain, on Malta and North Africa, including Algeria.

The wingspan is 30–31 mm. The forewings are greyish-olive brown with white lines and spots. The hindwings are grey with darkly dusted veins and a broad darker margin.
