= Evergestis marionalis =

Scientific classification
- Domain: Eukaryota
- Kingdom: Animalia
- Phylum: Arthropoda
- Class: Insecta
- Order: Lepidoptera
- Family: Crambidae
- Genus: Evergestis
- Species: E. marionalis

Binomial name
- Evergestis marionalis Leraut, 2003

Species of moth

Evergestis marionalis is a species of moth in the family Crambidae described by Patrice J.A. Leraut in 2003. It is found in south-eastern France, Spain, Malta and North Africa (Algeria, Morocco and Tunisia).

The wingspan is 18–20 millimetres (0.71–0.79 in). Adults are on wing in February and March, and again from July to October in at least two generations per year.

The larvae probably feed on Brassicaceae species.
