= Evergestis marocana =

Scientific classification
- Domain: Eukaryota
- Kingdom: Animalia
- Phylum: Arthropoda
- Class: Insecta
- Order: Lepidoptera
- Family: Crambidae
- Genus: Evergestis
- Species: E. marocana

Binomial name
- Evergestis marocana (D. Lucas, 1856)

Synonyms
- Pionea verbascalis var. marocana D. Lucas, 1956

Species of moth

Evergestis marocana is a species of moth in the family Crambidae. It is found in France, Portugal and North Africa, including Morocco.

The wingspan is about 18 mm. Adults are on wing from May to October in two generations per year.
