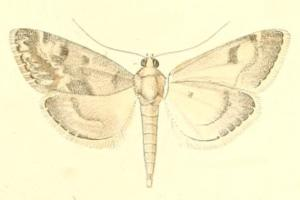

Scientific classification
- Domain: Eukaryota
- Kingdom: Animalia
- Phylum: Arthropoda
- Class: Insecta
- Order: Lepidoptera
- Family: Crambidae
- Genus: Evergestis
- Species: E. infirmalis

Binomial name
- Evergestis infirmalis (Staudinger, 1871)

Synonyms
- Botys infirmalis Staudinger, 1871; Botys helenalis Staudinger, 1870

= Evergestis infirmalis =

Species of moth

Evergestis infirmalis is a species of moth in the family Crambidae. It is found in Greece, European Russia, Northeast Caucasus, Turkey and Syria.

The wingspan is 22–26 mm. Females are somewhat larger than males. In Greece, adults are on wing in July.
