= Evergestis obliqualis =

Scientific classification
- Kingdom: Animalia
- Phylum: Arthropoda
- Clade: Pancrustacea
- Class: Insecta
- Order: Lepidoptera
- Family: Crambidae
- Genus: Evergestis
- Species: E. obliqualis

Binomial name
- Evergestis obliqualis (Grote, 1883)

Synonyms
- Paraedis obliqualis Grote, 1883; Mesographe obliqualis

Species of moth

Evergestis obliqualis is a moth in the family Crambidae. It was described by Augustus Radcliffe Grote in 1883. It is found in North America, where it has been recorded from Arizona, California, Colorado, New Mexico, Texas and Utah.

The length of the forewings is 13–18 mm. Adults are on wing from June to September.

The larvae feed on Portulaca species.
