= Evergestis exoticalis =

Scientific classification
- Kingdom: Animalia
- Phylum: Arthropoda
- Class: Insecta
- Order: Lepidoptera
- Family: Crambidae
- Genus: Evergestis
- Species: E. exoticalis

Binomial name
- Evergestis exoticalis (Snellen, 1875)

Synonyms
- Odontia exoticalis Snellen, 1875; Evergestis squamalis Dognin, 1908

Species of moth

Evergestis exoticalis is a moth in the family Crambidae. It is found in Colombia and Peru.
