= Evergestis anticlina =

Scientific classification
- Kingdom: Animalia
- Phylum: Arthropoda
- Clade: Pancrustacea
- Class: Insecta
- Order: Lepidoptera
- Family: Crambidae
- Genus: Evergestis
- Species: E. anticlina

Binomial name
- Evergestis anticlina Munroe, 1959

Species of moth

Evergestis anticlina is a species of moth in the family Crambidae. It is found in Argentina and Bolivia.
