= Evergestis dognini =

Scientific classification
- Kingdom: Animalia
- Phylum: Arthropoda
- Class: Insecta
- Order: Lepidoptera
- Family: Crambidae
- Genus: Evergestis
- Species: E. dognini

Binomial name
- Evergestis dognini Hampson, 1918

Synonyms
- Evergestis obliqualis Dognin, 1905

Species of moth

Evergestis dognini is a moth in the family Crambidae. It was described by George Hampson in 1918. It is found in Peru.
