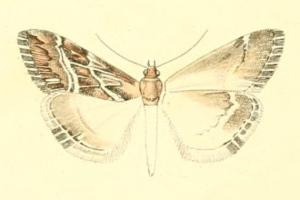

Scientific classification
- Domain: Eukaryota
- Kingdom: Animalia
- Phylum: Arthropoda
- Class: Insecta
- Order: Lepidoptera
- Family: Crambidae
- Genus: Evergestis
- Species: E. serratalis

Binomial name
- Evergestis serratalis (Staudinger, 1871)

Synonyms
- Botys serratalis Staudinger, 1871

= Evergestis serratalis =

Species of moth

Evergestis serratalis is a species of moth in the family Crambidae. It is found in Ukraine, the Republic of Macedonia, Greece, Turkey and Russia.

The wingspan is about 21 mm. Adults are on wing in September.
