= Evergestis subterminalis =

Scientific classification
- Domain: Eukaryota
- Kingdom: Animalia
- Phylum: Arthropoda
- Class: Insecta
- Order: Lepidoptera
- Family: Crambidae
- Genus: Evergestis
- Species: E. subterminalis

Binomial name
- Evergestis subterminalis Barnes & McDunnough, 1914

Species of moth

Evergestis subterminalis is a moth in the family Crambidae. It was described by William Barnes and James Halliday McDunnough in 1914. It is found in western North America, where it has been recorded from west central Alberta south to Colorado, Utah and California. The habitat consists of montane meadows.

The wingspan is about 30 mm. The forewings are dark grey, crossed by black angled antemedian and postmedian lines. The median area is suffused and bordered with white scales. The area between the postmedian and subterminal lines is rust red and the terminal area is grey. The hindwings are pale pink ochre with a dark postmedian line and a broader terminal band. Adults have been recorded on wing from July to October.
