= Evergestis spiniferalis =

Scientific classification
- Domain: Eukaryota
- Kingdom: Animalia
- Phylum: Arthropoda
- Class: Insecta
- Order: Lepidoptera
- Family: Crambidae
- Genus: Evergestis
- Species: E. spiniferalis

Binomial name
- Evergestis spiniferalis (Staudinger, 1900)

Synonyms
- Orobena spiniferalis Staudinger, 1900

Species of moth

Evergestis spiniferalis is a species of moth in the family Crambidae. It is found in Russia and Uzbekistan.

The wingspan is about 29 mm. Adults are on wing from mid May to the beginning of June and again in August in two generations per year.
