= Evergestis dischematalis =

Scientific classification
- Domain: Eukaryota
- Kingdom: Animalia
- Phylum: Arthropoda
- Class: Insecta
- Order: Lepidoptera
- Family: Crambidae
- Genus: Evergestis
- Species: E. dischematalis

Binomial name
- Evergestis dischematalis Munroe, 1995

Synonyms
- Evergestis dimorphalis Munroe, 1974 (preocc. Osthelder, 1938)

Species of moth

Evergestis dischematalis is a moth in the family Crambidae. It is found in North America, where it has been recorded from Arizona and New Mexico.
