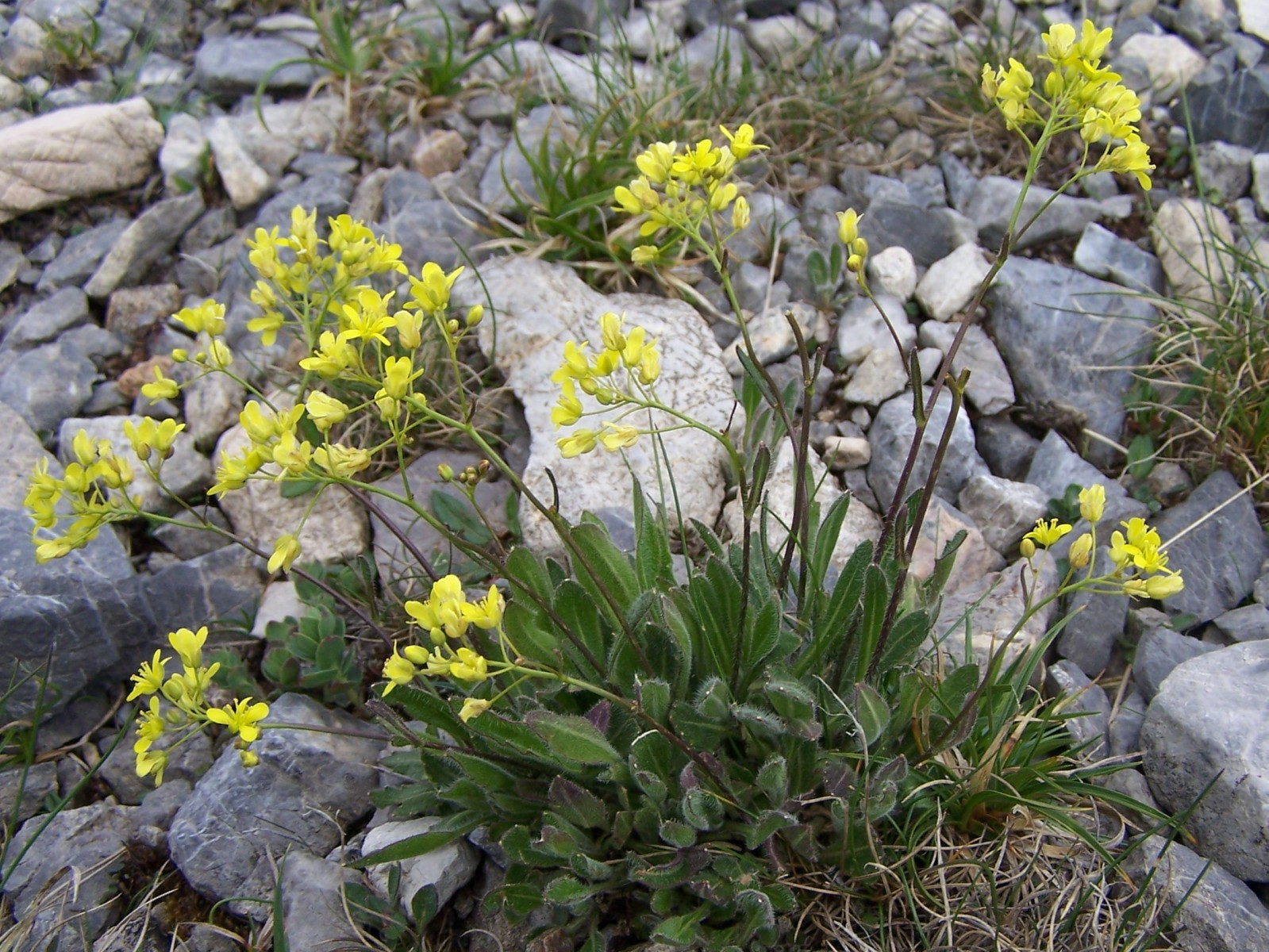
- Biscutella laevigata

Scientific classification
- Kingdom: Plantae
- Clade: Tracheophytes
- Clade: Angiosperms
- Clade: Eudicots
- Clade: Rosids
- Order: Brassicales
- Family: Brassicaceae
- Genus: Biscutella; L.

Synonyms
- Perspicillum Heist. ex Fabr.; Thlaspidium Mill.; Jondraba Medik.

= Biscutella =

Genus of flowering plants

Biscutella is a genus of over 50 species of flowering plants in the family Brassicaceae.

It contains the following species:

- Biscutella alcarriae A.Segura
- Biscutella ambigua DC.
- Biscutella apuana Raffaelli
- Biscutella arvernensis Jord.
- Biscutella atlantica (Maire) Greuter & Burdet
- Biscutella atropurpurea Mateo & Figuerola
- Biscutella auriculata L.
- Biscutella bilbilitana Mateo & M.B.Crespo
- Biscutella boetica Boiss. & Reut.
- Biscutella brevicalcarata (Batt.) Batt.
- Biscutella brevicaulis Jord.
- Biscutella brevifolia (Rouy & Foucaud) Guinea
- Biscutella calduchii (O.Bolòs & Masclans) Mateo & M.B.Crespo
- Biscutella caroli-pauana Stübing, Peris & Figuerola
- Biscutella cichoriifolia Loisel.
- Biscutella conquensis Mateo & M.B.Crespo
- Biscutella controversa Boreau
- Biscutella coronopifolia L.
- Biscutella didyma L.
- Biscutella divionensis Jord.
- Biscutella dufourii G.Mateo & M.B.Crespo
- Biscutella ebusitana Rosselló & L.Sáez
- Biscutella eriocarpa DC.
- Biscutella flexuosa Jord.
- Biscutella fontqueri Guinea & Heywood
- Biscutella frutescens Coss.
- Biscutella glacialis (Boiss. & Reut.) Jord.
- Biscutella gredensis Guinea
- Biscutella guillonii Jord.
- Biscutella incana Ten.
- Biscutella intermedia Gouan
- Biscutella laevigata L.
- Biscutella lima Rchb.
- Biscutella lucentina M.B.Crespo & Mateo
- Biscutella lyrata L.
- Biscutella maestratensis Mateo & M.B.Crespo
- Biscutella marinae M.B.Crespo, Mateo & Solanas
- Biscutella maritima Ten.
- Biscutella mauritanica Jord.
- Biscutella mollis Loisel.
- Biscutella neustriaca Bonnet
- Biscutella ossolana (Raffaelli & Baldoin) Landolt
- Biscutella pichiana Raffaelli
- Biscutella pseudolyrata A.Vicente, M.Á.Alonso & M.B.Crespo
- Biscutella raphanifolia Poir.
- Biscutella rotgesii Foucaud
- Biscutella scaposa Sennen ex Mach.-Laur.
- Biscutella sclerocarpa Revel
- Biscutella segurae Mateo & M.B.Crespo
- Biscutella sempervirens L.
- Biscutella turolensis Pau ex M.B.Crespo, Güemes & Mateo
- Biscutella valentina (Loefl. ex L.) Heywood
- Biscutella variegata Boiss. & Reut.
