= Lepidoplaga flavicinctalis =

Scientific classification
- Kingdom: Animalia
- Phylum: Arthropoda
- Class: Insecta
- Order: Lepidoptera
- Family: Crambidae
- Genus: Lepidoplaga
- Species: L. flavicinctalis

Binomial name
- Lepidoplaga flavicinctalis (Snellen, 1890)

Synonyms
- Crocidophora flavicinctalis Snellen, 1890; Evergestis flavicinctalis

Species of moth

Lepidoplaga flavicinctalis is a moth in the family Crambidae. It was described by Snellen in 1890. It is found in India (Sikkim) and Sri Lanka.
