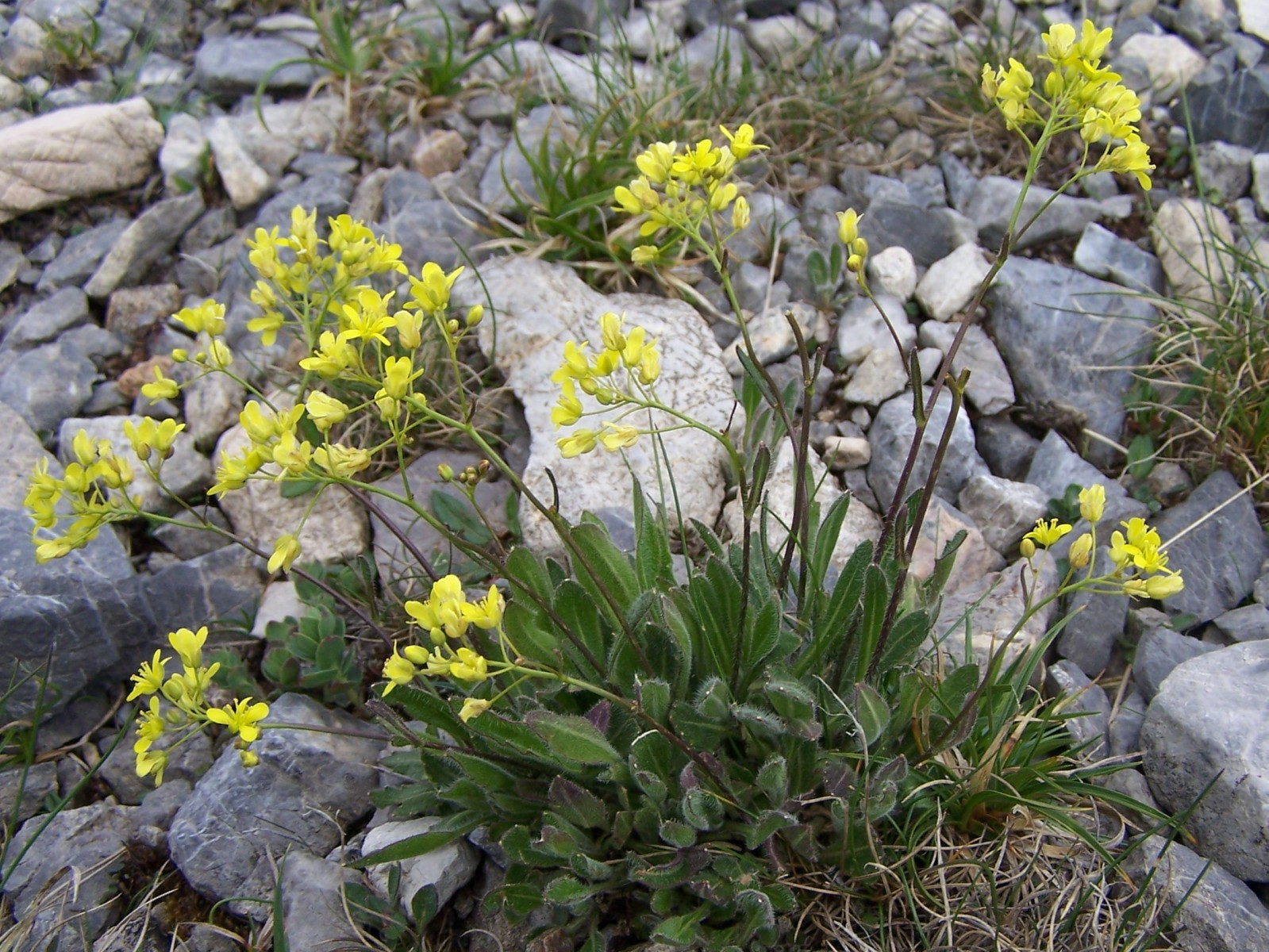

Scientific classification
- Kingdom: Plantae
- Clade: Tracheophytes
- Clade: Angiosperms
- Clade: Eudicots
- Clade: Rosids
- Order: Brassicales
- Family: Brassicaceae
- Genus: Biscutella
- Species: B. laevigata

Binomial name
- Biscutella laevigata L.

= Biscutella laevigata =

Buckler-mustard

Species of flowering plant

Biscutella laevigata, the buckler-mustard is a species of perennial herb in the family crucifers. They have a self-supporting growth form. They are associated with freshwater habitat. They have simple, broad leaves. Individuals can grow to 0.23 m.

Biscutella has been proposed for phytoremediation, as it can collect large amounts of thallium.

== Cultivation ==
Rapidly germinating, keep seed in constant moisture (not wet) with temperatures of about +20 °C [68 °F]. Seeds must be covered thinly. Do not cover very small seeds, but tightly press into the earth. Keep in cooler conditions after germination occurs.

== Subspecies ==
- Biscutella laevigata varia
- Biscutella laevigata lucida
- Biscutella laevigata kerneri
