= Ramón Agenjo Cecilia =

Spanish entomologist (1908–1984)

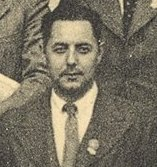
- Ramón Agenjo at the International Congress of Entomology, Madrid, 1935
- Born: January 21, 1908; Santander, Cantabria, Spain
- Died: April 19, 1984; Madrid, Spain
- Education: Complutense University of Madrid
- Known for: Contributions to Spanish lepidopterology
- Awards: Order of Alfonso X the Wise (Encomienda with plaque, 1978)
- Scientific career
- Fields: Entomology, Lepidopterology
- Workplaces: Spanish National Research Council (CSIC); Spanish Institute of Entomology
- Author abbrev. (zoology): Agenjo

Ramón Agenjo Cecilia (21 January 1908 – 19 April 1984) was a Spanish entomologist and lepidopterist, specializing in the study of Spanish Lepidoptera. He served as director of the Spanish Institute of Entomology from 1967 to 1984.

== Biography ==
Although Agenjo earned a law degree from the University of Madrid, his interest in lepidopterology was strong from childhood.

In 1928 he joined the Entomology Section of the Museo Nacional de Ciencias Naturales, then under the Board for Advanced Studies and Scientific Research. At that time, the museum was directed by Ignacio Bolívar, and his son Cándido Bolívar Pieltain was head of the Entomology Section. By 1936, Agenjo held the position of assistant with a salary of 250 pesetas, and in 1939 his post was confirmed.

Following the creation of the Spanish National Research Council (CSIC) in 1939, Agenjo became assistant at the José de Acosta Institute of Natural Sciences under the Santiago Ramón y Cajal Board.

In 1941 he joined the newly created Spanish Institute of Entomology, led by Gonzalo Ceballos y Fernández de Córdoba.

He was appointed entomologist of the Institute in 1945, and later, in 1972, research professor at the CSIC in the field of entomology.

In 1967 Agenjo became director of the institute, a position he held until his retirement on 31 January 1978, after which he was named honorary director until his death in 1984.

He focused on the study of Spanish Lepidoptera fauna, contributing to many national and international publications. From 1941 he was part of the editorial board of EOS: Revista Española de Entomología and served as its director from 1967 to 1977.

He co-founded Graellsia: Revista de entomólogos españoles with Gonzalo Ceballos y Fernández de Córdoba and Eduardo Zarco, serving as its director from 1965 to 1977.

He represented Spain at several international entomology congresses, including those held in Madrid (1935), Stockholm (1948), Amsterdam (1951), Vienna (1960), London (1964), and Moscow (1968).

Agenjo was a member of several learned societies, including the Spanish Royal Society of Natural History, The Lepidopterists' Society (vice president in 1965), the Accademia di agricoltura di Torino, and the Societas Entomologica Fennica.

He worked for periods at institutions across Europe, including the National Museum of Natural History (France), the Natural History Museum, Vienna, the Natural History Museum, London, and several Portuguese natural history museums.

In recognition of his lifelong dedication to entomological research, he was awarded the Order of Alfonso X the Wise (Encomienda with plaque) on 24 June 1978.

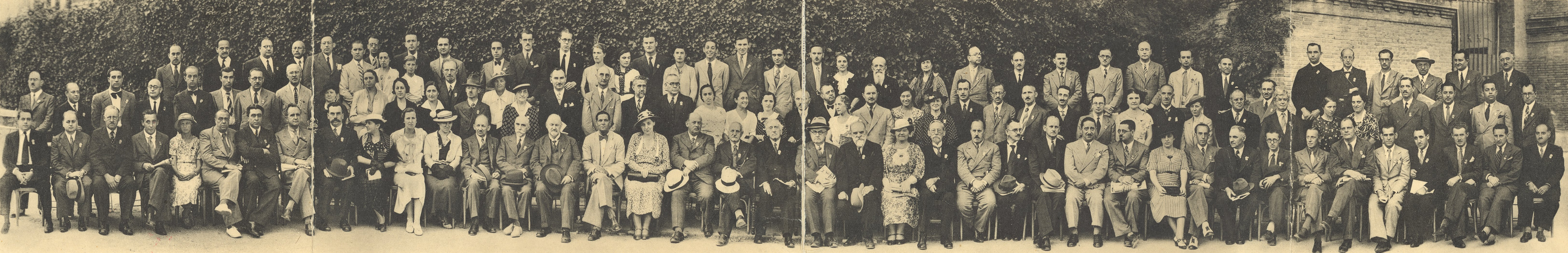
Attendees at the 6th International Congress of Entomology, Madrid, 1935

== Work ==
Agenjo was the first Spanish entomologist to use the structure of male genitalia to identify species, and among the first to emphasize the importance of studying female genitalia for classification. Over his career, he prepared around 8,000 microscopic genitalia slides and described 39 new species.

He contributed extensively to the understanding of Iberian lepidopteran fauna, much of which now forms part of the National Museum of Natural Sciences collections.

He collaborated with agricultural and forestry services to identify and manage harmful Lepidoptera and pest species.

At the time of his death, Agenjo was preparing two major manuscripts: History of Lepidopterology in Spain and The Sphingids of Spain, both richly illustrated.

== Publications ==
From his first article in 1933 (Una nueva especie del género Evergestis Hb. (Lep. Pyr.)), Agenjo published more than 200 works. A 1984 compilation listed 227 papers.

His most cited work is Fáunula lepidopterológica almeriense (1952), for which he received the Alonso de Herrera Prize from the CSIC in 1950. He also authored the multi-volume Catalogue of the Lepidoptera of Spain (1946–1977).
