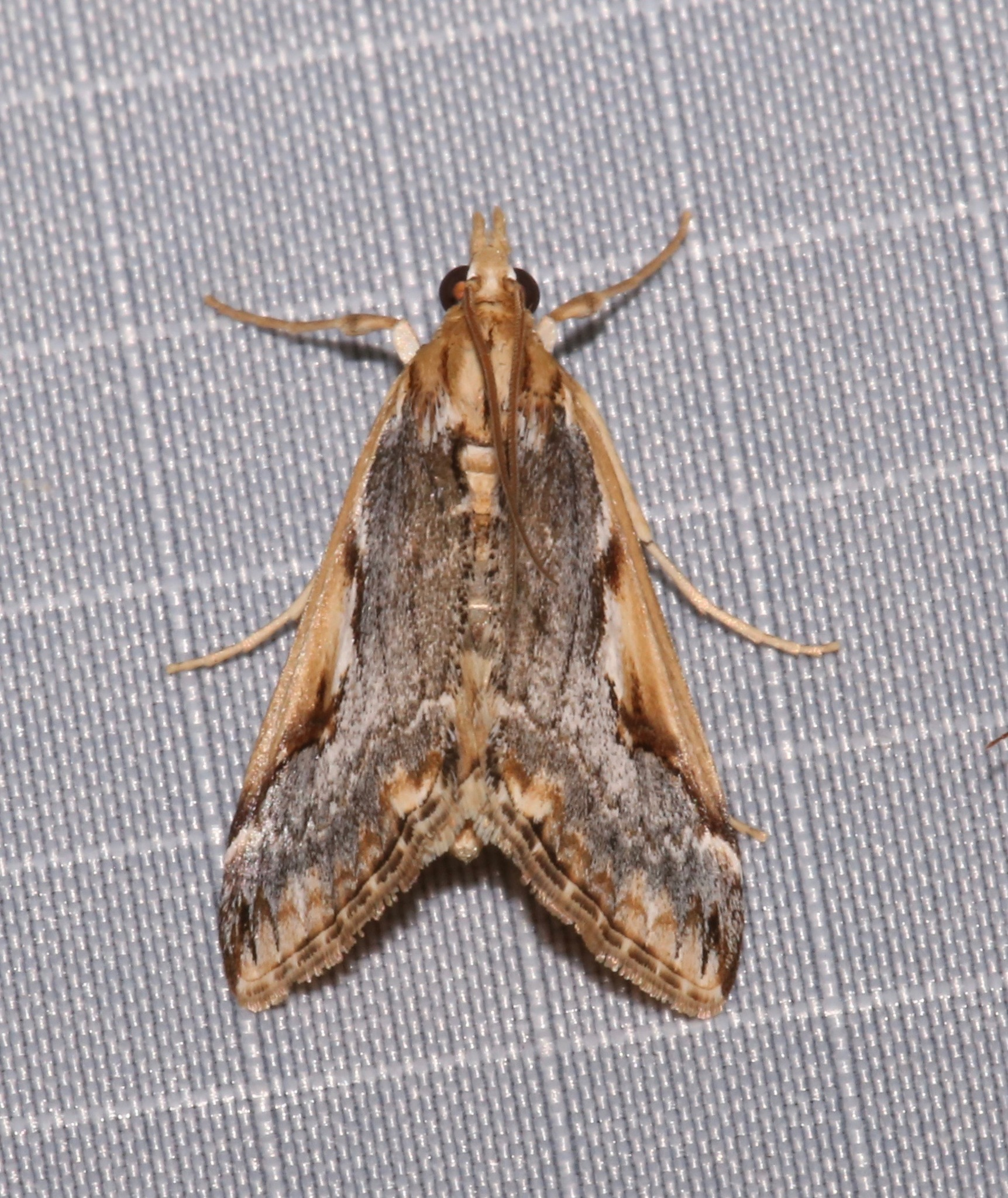

Scientific classification
- Kingdom: Animalia
- Phylum: Arthropoda
- Clade: Pancrustacea
- Class: Insecta
- Order: Lepidoptera
- Family: Crambidae
- Genus: Loxostege
- Species: L. albiceralis

Binomial name
- Loxostege albiceralis (Grote, 1878)

Synonyms
- Botis albiceralis Grote, 1878

= Loxostege albiceralis =

Species of moth

Loxostege albiceralis is a moth in the family Crambidae. It was described by Augustus Radcliffe Grote in 1878. It is found in North America where it has been recorded from southern California and Nevada to Texas. The habitat consists of arid areas and deserts.

The length of the forewings is 13–18 mm. Adults have been recorded on wing from March to October.

The larvae feed on Lycium carolinianum var. quadrifidum.
