= Loxostege floridalis =

Scientific classification
- Kingdom: Animalia
- Phylum: Arthropoda
- Clade: Pancrustacea
- Class: Insecta
- Order: Lepidoptera
- Family: Crambidae
- Genus: Loxostege
- Species: L. floridalis

Binomial name
- Loxostege floridalis Barnes & McDunnough, 1913

Synonyms
- Loxostege albiceralis floridalis Barnes & McDunnough, 1913

Species of moth

Loxostege floridalis, the Christmas-berry webworm moth, is a moth in the family Crambidae. It was described by William Barnes and James Halliday McDunnough in 1913. It is found in North America, where it has been recorded from Florida and Texas.

Adults have been recorded on wing from September to May.

The larvae feed on Lycium carolinianum var. quadrifidum.
