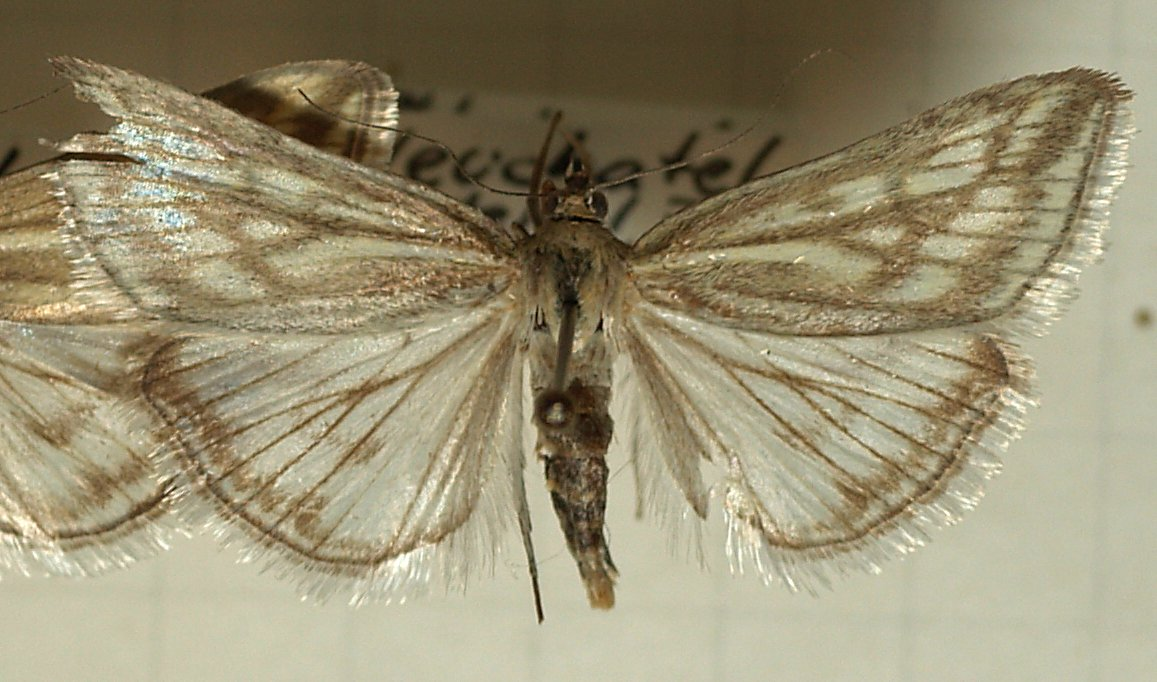

Scientific classification
- Domain: Eukaryota
- Kingdom: Animalia
- Phylum: Arthropoda
- Class: Insecta
- Order: Lepidoptera
- Family: Crambidae
- Subfamily: Pyraustinae
- Genus: Loxostege; Hübner, 1825

Synonyms
- Boreophila Duponchel, 1845; Cosmocreon Warren, 1892; Leimonia Hübner, 1825; Limonia J. L. R. Agassiz, 1847; Margaritia Stephens, 1827; Parasitochroa Hannemann, 1964; Maroa Barnes & McDunnough, 1914; Meridiophila Marion, 1963; Polingia Barnes & McDunnough, 1914

= Loxostege =

Genus of moths

Loxostege is a genus of moths of the family Crambidae.

== Species ==
- Loxostege aemulalis (Dognin, 1905)
- Loxostege aeruginalis (Hübner, 1796)
- Loxostege albiceralis (Grote, 1878)
- Loxostege albifascialis Walsingham & Hampson, 1896
- Loxostege allectalis (Grote, 1877)
- Loxostege anartalis (Grote, 1878)
- Loxostege angustipennis (Zerny, 1914)
- Loxostege annaphilalis (Grote, 1881)
- Loxostege argyrostacta (Hampson, 1910)
- Loxostege aurantiacalis (Warren, 1889)
- Loxostege badakschanalis (Amsel, 1970)
- Loxostege bicoloralis Warren, 1892
- Loxostege brunneitincta Munroe, 1976
- Loxostege caradjana (Popescu-Gorj, 1991)
- Loxostege cereralis (Zeller, 1872)
- Loxostege clathralis (Hübner, 1813)
- Loxostege commixtalis (Walker, 1866)
- Loxostege comptalis (Freyer, 1848)
- Loxostege confusalis (South in Leech & South, 1901)
- Loxostege damergouensis Rothschild, 1921
- Loxostege darwinialis (Sauber, 1904)
- Loxostege decaryalis Marion & Viette, 1956
- Loxostege deliblatica Szent-Ivány & Uhrik-Meszáros, 1942
- Loxostege diaphana (Caradja & Meyrick, 1934)
- Loxostege egregialis Munroe, 1976
- Loxostege ephippialis (Zetterstedt, 1839)
- Loxostege eversmanni (Staudinger, 1892)
- Loxostege expansalis (Eversmann, 1852)
- Loxostege farsalis Amsel, 1950
- Loxostege fascialis (Hübner, 1796)
- Loxostege flavinigralis (Hampson, 1910)
- Loxostege floridalis Barnes & McDunnough, 1913
- Loxostege formosibia (Strand, 1918)
- Loxostege frustalis (Zeller, 1852)
- Loxostege galbula (C. Felder, R. Felder & Rogenhofer, 1875)
- Loxostege graeseri (Staudinger, 1892)
- Loxostege heliosalis (Hampson, 1912)
- Loxostege immerens Harvey, 1875
- Loxostege impeditalis (Maassen, 1890)
- Loxostege inconspicualis (Zerny, 1914)
- Loxostege indentalis (Grote, 1883)
- Loxostege kearfottalis Walter, 1928
- Loxostege kingi Munroe, 1976
- Loxostege lepidalis (Hulst, 1886)
- Loxostege leucalis (Hampson, 1900)
- Loxostege leuconeuralis (Hampson, 1908)
- Loxostege malekalis Amsel, 1950
- Loxostege manualis (Geyer in Hübner, 1832)
- Loxostege minimalis Amsel, 1956
- Loxostege mira Amsel, 1951
- Loxostege mojavealis Capps, 1967
- Loxostege mucosalis (Herrich-Schäffer, 1848)
- Loxostege munroealis Leraut, 2005
- Loxostege naranjalis (Schaus, 1920)
- Loxostege nissalis (Amsel, 1961)
- Loxostege oberthuralis Fernald, 1894
- Loxostege oblinalis (C. Felder, R. Felder & Rogenhofer, 1875)
- Loxostege ochrealis (Wileman, 1911)
- Loxostege oculifera (E. Hering, 1901)
- Loxostege offumalis (Hulst, 1886)
- Loxostege peltalis (Eversmann, 1842)
- Loxostege peltaloides (Rebel in Wagner, 1932)
- Loxostege perticalis (C. Felder, R. Felder & Rogenhofer, 1875)
- Loxostege phaeoneuralis (Hampson, 1900)
- Loxostege phaeopteralis (Hampson, 1913)
- Loxostege quaestoralis (Barnes & McDunnough, 1914)
- Loxostege rhabdalis (Hampson, 1900)
- Loxostege scalaralis (Christoph, 1877)
- Loxostege scutalis (Hübner, 1813)
- Loxostege sedakowialis (Eversmann, 1852)
- Loxostege sierralis Munroe, 1976
- Loxostege sticticalis (Linnaeus, 1761)
- Loxostege straminealis (Hampson, 1900)
- Loxostege subcuprea (Dognin, 1906)
- Loxostege terpnalis Barnes & McDunnough, 1918
- Loxostege tesselalis (Guenee, 1854)
- Loxostege thallophilalis (Hulst, 1886) or Loxostege thrallophilalis
- Loxostege triselena (Meyrick, 1937)
- Loxostege turbidalis (Treitschke, 1829)
- Loxostege typhonalis Barnes & McDunnough, 1914
- Loxostege unicoloralis (Barnes & McDunnough, 1914)
- Loxostege uniformis (Hampson, 1913)
- Loxostege venustalis (Stoll in Cramer & Stoll, 1781)
- Loxostege violaceotincta (Caradja, 1939)
- Loxostege virescalis (Guenée, 1854)
- Loxostege wagneri Zerny in Wagner, 1929
- Loxostege xuthusalis (Hampson in Elwes, Hampson & Durrant, 1906)
- Loxostege ziczac (Sauber, 1899)

== Status unclear ==
- Loxostege pallidalis (Haworth, 1811), described as Pyralis pallidalis from Great Britain.

== Former species ==
- Loxostege clarissalis (Schaus, 1920)
- Loxostege concoloralis (Lederer, 1857)
- Loxostege flavivenalis (Hampson, 1913)
- Loxostege plumbatalis (Zeller, 1852)
