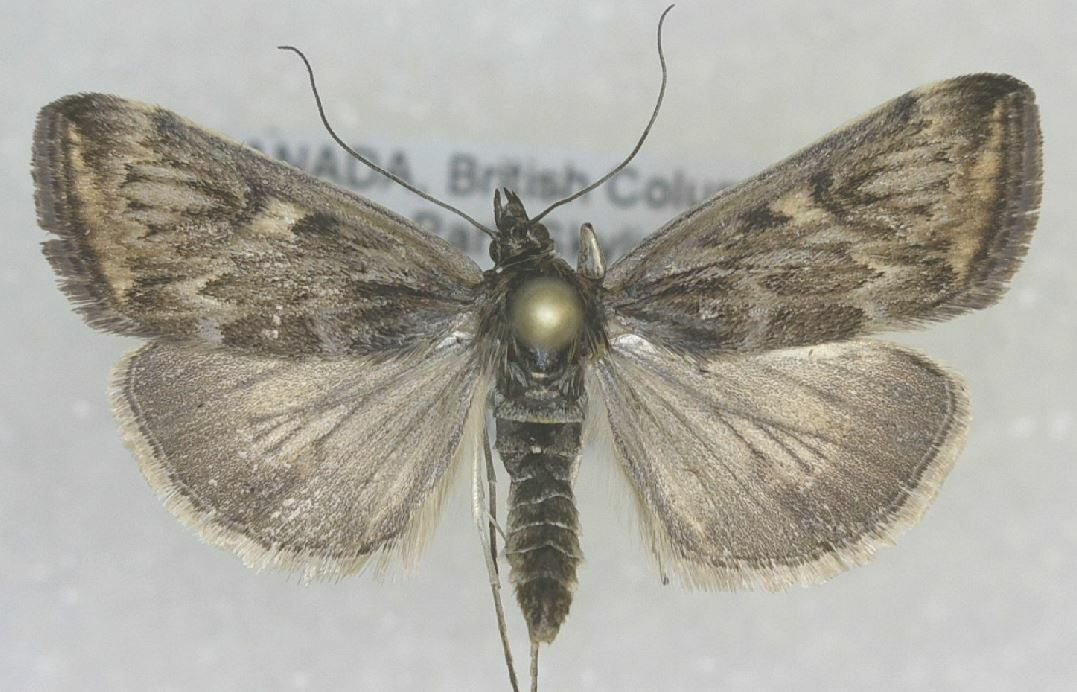

Scientific classification
- Kingdom: Animalia
- Phylum: Arthropoda
- Clade: Pancrustacea
- Class: Insecta
- Order: Lepidoptera
- Family: Crambidae
- Genus: Loxostege
- Species: L. sierralis

Binomial name
- Loxostege sierralis Munroe, 1976

= Loxostege sierralis =

Species of moth

Loxostege sierralis is a species of moth in the family Crambidae. It was first described by Eugene G. Munroe in 1976. It is found in North America, where it has been recorded from British Columbia, Saskatchewan, Washington, Utah, Oregon and California.

== Subspecies ==
- Loxostege sierralis sierralis (California)
- Loxostege sierralis internationalis Munroe, 1976 (southern British Columbia, Washington, northern Oregon)
- Loxostege sierralis sanpetealis Munroe, 1976 (Utah)
- Loxostege sierralis tularealis Munroe, 1976 (California)
