= Loxostege formosibia =

Scientific classification
- Kingdom: Animalia
- Phylum: Arthropoda
- Clade: Pancrustacea
- Class: Insecta
- Order: Lepidoptera
- Family: Crambidae
- Genus: Loxostege
- Species: L. formosibia

Binomial name
- Loxostege formosibia (Strand, 1918)

Synonyms
- Phlyctaenodes massalis f. formosibia Strand, 1918

Species of moth

Loxostege formosibia is a moth in the family Crambidae. It was described by Strand in 1918. It is found in Taiwan.
