= Loxostege violaceotincta =

Scientific classification
- Kingdom: Animalia
- Phylum: Arthropoda
- Clade: Pancrustacea
- Class: Insecta
- Order: Lepidoptera
- Family: Crambidae
- Genus: Loxostege
- Species: L. violaceotincta

Binomial name
- Loxostege violaceotincta (Caradja, 1939)

Synonyms
- Sylepta violaceotincta Caradja, 1939

Species of moth

Loxostege violaceotincta is a moth in the family Crambidae. It was described by Aristide Caradja in 1939. It is found in the western Himalayas.
