= Loxostege quaestoralis =

Scientific classification
- Kingdom: Animalia
- Phylum: Arthropoda
- Clade: Pancrustacea
- Class: Insecta
- Order: Lepidoptera
- Family: Crambidae
- Genus: Loxostege
- Species: L. quaestoralis

Binomial name
- Loxostege quaestoralis (Barnes & McDunnough, 1914)

Synonyms
- Polingia quaestoralis Barnes & McDunnough, 1914

Species of moth

Loxostege quaestoralis is a moth in the family Crambidae. It was described by William Barnes and James Halliday McDunnough in 1914. It is found in North America, where it has been recorded from California to New Mexico.

The wingspan is about 19 mm. The forewings are pale ochreous shaded with black at the costa and basally. The hindwings are blackish, crossed by a faint paler subterminal band. The outer margin is pale ochreous. Adults have been recorded on wing from January to February.
