= Loxostege phaeopteralis =

Scientific classification
- Kingdom: Animalia
- Phylum: Arthropoda
- Clade: Pancrustacea
- Class: Insecta
- Order: Lepidoptera
- Family: Crambidae
- Genus: Loxostege
- Species: L. phaeopteralis

Binomial name
- Loxostege phaeopteralis (Hampson, 1913)

Synonyms
- Phlyctaenodes phaeopteralis Hampson, 1913

Species of moth

Loxostege phaeopteralis is a moth in the family Crambidae. It was described by George Hampson in 1913. It was described from Ron Island.
