= Loxostege wagneri =

Scientific classification
- Kingdom: Animalia
- Phylum: Arthropoda
- Clade: Pancrustacea
- Class: Insecta
- Order: Lepidoptera
- Family: Crambidae
- Genus: Loxostege
- Species: L. wagneri

Binomial name
- Loxostege wagneri Zerny in Wagner, 1929

Species of moth

Loxostege wagneri is a moth in the family Crambidae. It was described by Zerny in 1929. It is found in Turkey.
