= Semniomima josialis =

Scientific classification
- Kingdom: Animalia
- Phylum: Arthropoda
- Class: Insecta
- Order: Lepidoptera
- Family: Crambidae
- Genus: Semniomima
- Species: S. josialis

Binomial name
- Semniomima josialis (Hampson, 1918)

Synonyms
- Noctuelia josialis Hampson, 1918

Species of moth

Semniomima josialis is a moth in the family Crambidae. It was described by George Hampson in 1918. It is found in Venezuela.
