= Semniomima anubisalis =

Scientific classification
- Domain: Eukaryota
- Kingdom: Animalia
- Phylum: Arthropoda
- Class: Insecta
- Order: Lepidoptera
- Family: Crambidae
- Genus: Semniomima
- Species: S. anubisalis

Binomial name
- Semniomima anubisalis (Schaus, 1934)

Synonyms
- Noctuelia anubisalis Schaus, 1934

Species of moth

Semniomima anubisalis is a moth in the family Crambidae. It is found in Brazil.
