= Loxostege ziczac =

Scientific classification
- Kingdom: Animalia
- Phylum: Arthropoda
- Clade: Pancrustacea
- Class: Insecta
- Order: Lepidoptera
- Family: Crambidae
- Genus: Loxostege
- Species: L. ziczac

Binomial name
- Loxostege ziczac (Sauber, 1899)

Synonyms
- Eurycreon ziczac Sauber, 1899

Species of moth

Loxostege ziczac is a moth in the family Crambidae. It was described by Sauber in 1899. It is found in Central Asia.
