= Loxostege comptalis =

Scientific classification
- Kingdom: Animalia
- Phylum: Arthropoda
- Clade: Pancrustacea
- Class: Insecta
- Order: Lepidoptera
- Family: Crambidae
- Genus: Loxostege
- Species: L. comptalis

Binomial name
- Loxostege comptalis (Freyer, 1848)

Synonyms
- Botys comptalis Freyer, 1848

Species of moth

Loxostege comptalis is a species of moth in the family Crambidae. It is found in France, Spain, Croatia, Ukraine and Russia. It is also found in North Africa (including Tunisia) and in Turkey.
