= Semniomima flaviceps =

Scientific classification
- Kingdom: Animalia
- Phylum: Arthropoda
- Class: Insecta
- Order: Lepidoptera
- Family: Crambidae
- Genus: Semniomima
- Species: S. flaviceps

Binomial name
- Semniomima flaviceps Burmeister, 1878

Species of moth

Semniomima flaviceps is a moth in the family Crambidae. It was described by Hermann Burmeister in 1878. It is found in Argentina.
