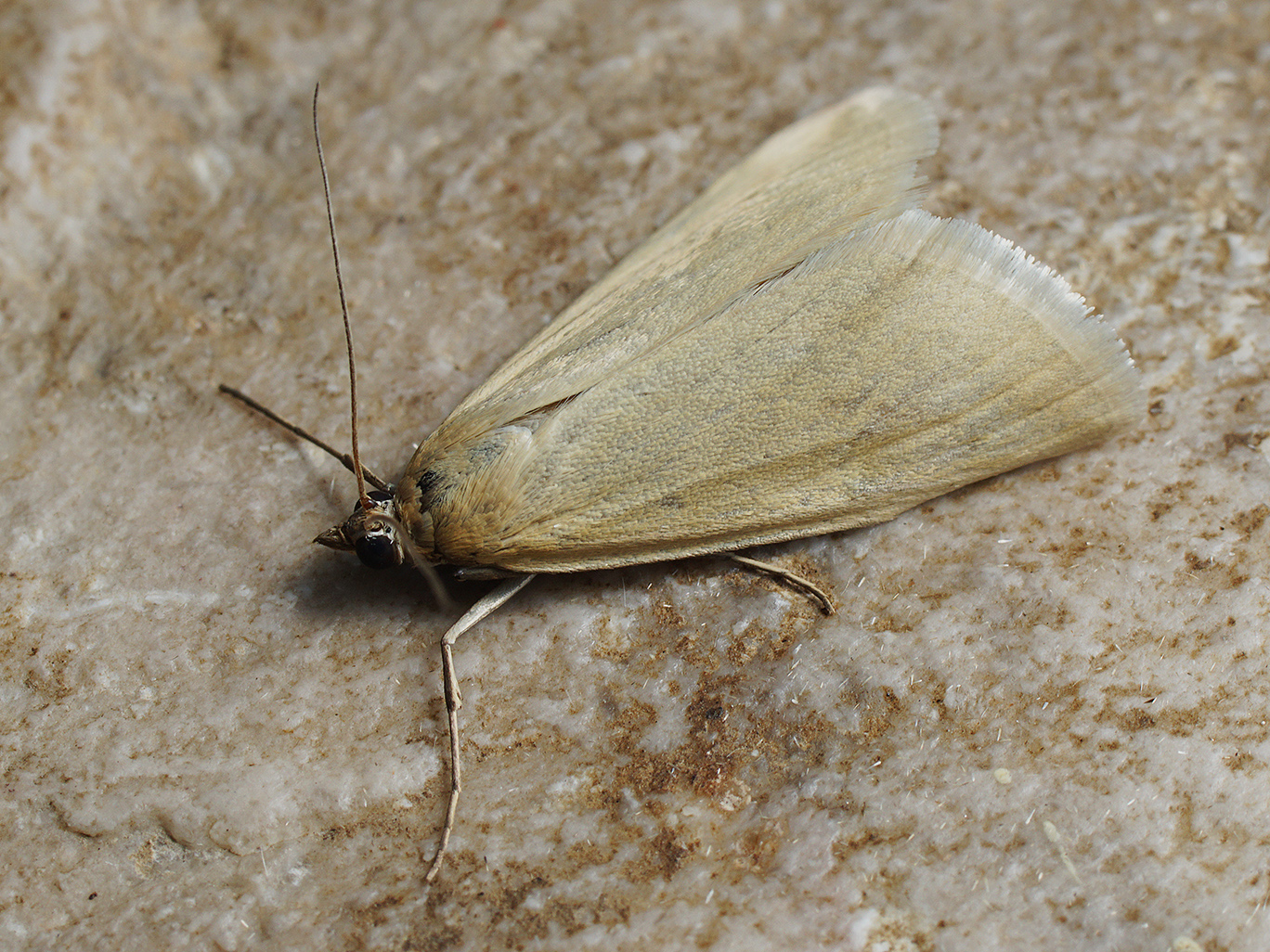

Scientific classification
- Kingdom: Animalia
- Phylum: Arthropoda
- Clade: Pancrustacea
- Class: Insecta
- Order: Lepidoptera
- Family: Crambidae
- Genus: Loxostege
- Species: L. turbidalis

Binomial name
- Loxostege turbidalis (Treitschke, 1829)

Synonyms
- Botys turbidalis Treitschke, 1829; Loxostege turbidalis glauca Caradja, 1934; Botys turbidalis inornatalis Leech, 1889; Phlyctaenodes yuennanensis Caradja in Caradja & Meyrick, 1937; Scopula flagellalis Duponchel, 1834

= Loxostege turbidalis =

Species of moth

Loxostege turbidalis is a species of moth in the family Crambidae. It was described by Treitschke in 1829. It is found in most of Europe, except Ireland, Great Britain, Norway, the Benelux and the Iberian Peninsula. It has also been recorded from Russia, Turkey, China and Japan.

The wingspan is 28–33 millimetres (1.1–1.3 in). Adults are on wing in June and July.

The larvae feed on Artemisia species.

== Subspecies ==
- Loxostege turbidalis turbidalis
- Loxostege turbidalis inornatalis Leech, 1889 (Japan)
