= Semniomima mesozonalis =

Scientific classification
- Kingdom: Animalia
- Phylum: Arthropoda
- Class: Insecta
- Order: Lepidoptera
- Family: Crambidae
- Genus: Semniomima
- Species: S. mesozonalis

Binomial name
- Semniomima mesozonalis (Hampson, 1913)

Synonyms
- Noctuelia mesozonalis Hampson, 1913

Species of moth

Semniomima mesozonalis is a moth in the family Crambidae. It was described by George Hampson in 1913. It is found in Argentina.
