= Loxostege offumalis =

Scientific classification
- Kingdom: Animalia
- Phylum: Arthropoda
- Clade: Pancrustacea
- Class: Insecta
- Order: Lepidoptera
- Family: Crambidae
- Genus: Loxostege
- Species: L. offumalis

Binomial name
- Loxostege offumalis (Hulst, 1886)

Synonyms
- Botis offumalis Hulst, 1886

Species of moth

Loxostege offumalis is a moth in the family Crambidae. It was described by George Duryea Hulst in 1886. It is found in North America, where it has been recorded from California.

The wingspan is 19–22 mm. The forewings are fuscous, shaded with black. There is a black basal dash, as well as a black reniform and orbicular spot. The hindwings are dark fuscous with a central row of black spots and a fuscous marginal band. Adults have been recorded on wing from February to March.
