= Loxostege darwinialis =

Scientific classification
- Kingdom: Animalia
- Phylum: Arthropoda
- Clade: Pancrustacea
- Class: Insecta
- Order: Lepidoptera
- Family: Crambidae
- Genus: Loxostege
- Species: L. darwinialis

Binomial name
- Loxostege darwinialis (Sauber, 1904)

Synonyms
- Phlyctaenodes darwinialis Sauber, 1904

Species of moth

Loxostege darwinialis is a moth in the family Crambidae. It was described by Sauber in 1904. It is found in Central Asia.
