= Semniomima peruensis =

Scientific classification
- Kingdom: Animalia
- Phylum: Arthropoda
- Class: Insecta
- Order: Lepidoptera
- Family: Crambidae
- Genus: Semniomima
- Species: S. peruensis

Binomial name
- Semniomima peruensis (Capps, 1967)

Synonyms
- Loxostege peruensis Capps, 1967

Species of moth

Semniomima peruensis is a moth in the family Crambidae. It was described by Hahn William Capps in 1967. It is found in Peru.

The wingspan is about 24 mm. The forewings are dull greyish brown, without any markings, except for brownish-fuscous accentuation of the veins. The hindwings are brownish fuscous, with black accentuation of the veins.
