= Loxostege damergouensis =

Scientific classification
- Kingdom: Animalia
- Phylum: Arthropoda
- Clade: Pancrustacea
- Class: Insecta
- Order: Lepidoptera
- Family: Crambidae
- Genus: Loxostege
- Species: L. damergouensis

Binomial name
- Loxostege damergouensis Rothschild, 1921

Species of moth

Loxostege damergouensis is a moth in the family Crambidae. It was described by Rothschild in 1921. It is found in Niger.
