= Loxostege diaphana =

Scientific classification
- Kingdom: Animalia
- Phylum: Arthropoda
- Clade: Pancrustacea
- Class: Insecta
- Order: Lepidoptera
- Family: Crambidae
- Genus: Loxostege
- Species: L. diaphana

Binomial name
- Loxostege diaphana (Caradja & Meyrick, 1934)

Synonyms
- Phlyctaenodes diaphana Caradja & Meyrick, 1934

Species of moth

Loxostege diaphana is a moth in the family Crambidae. It was described by Aristide Caradja and Edward Meyrick in 1934. It is found in Guangdong, China.
