= Loxostege uniformis =

Scientific classification
- Kingdom: Animalia
- Phylum: Arthropoda
- Clade: Pancrustacea
- Class: Insecta
- Order: Lepidoptera
- Family: Crambidae
- Genus: Loxostege
- Species: L. uniformis

Binomial name
- Loxostege uniformis (Hampson, 1913)

Synonyms
- Phlyctaenodes uniformis Hampson, 1913

Species of moth

Loxostege uniformis is a moth in the family Crambidae. It was described by George Hampson in 1913. It is found in Japan.
