= Loxostege naranjalis =

Scientific classification
- Kingdom: Animalia
- Phylum: Arthropoda
- Clade: Pancrustacea
- Class: Insecta
- Order: Lepidoptera
- Family: Crambidae
- Genus: Loxostege
- Species: L. naranjalis

Binomial name
- Loxostege naranjalis (Schaus, 1920)

Synonyms
- Lygropia naranjalis Schaus, 1920

Species of moth

Loxostege naranjalis is a moth in the family Crambidae. It was described by Schaus in 1920. It is found in Brazil (São Paulo).

The wingspan is about 23 mm. The fore- and hindwings are orange with black margins.
