= Loxostege immerens =

Scientific classification
- Kingdom: Animalia
- Phylum: Arthropoda
- Clade: Pancrustacea
- Class: Insecta
- Order: Lepidoptera
- Family: Crambidae
- Genus: Loxostege
- Species: L. immerens

Binomial name
- Loxostege immerens (Harvey, 1875)

Synonyms
- Annaphila immerens Harvey, 1875; Loxostege triumphalis Grote, 1902

Species of moth

Loxostege immerens is a moth in the family Crambidae. It was described by Leon F. Harvey in 1875. It is found in North America, where it has been recorded from California.

The wingspan is about 20 mm. The forewings are blackish gray. The hindwings are deep orange yellow. Adults have been recorded on wing in January and from March to June.
