= Semniomima polystrigalis =

Scientific classification
- Kingdom: Animalia
- Phylum: Arthropoda
- Clade: Pancrustacea
- Class: Insecta
- Order: Lepidoptera
- Family: Crambidae
- Genus: Semniomima
- Species: S. polystrigalis

Binomial name
- Semniomima polystrigalis (Hampson, 1898)

Synonyms
- Noctuelia polystrigalis Hampson, 1898

Species of moth

Semniomima polystrigalis is a moth in the family Crambidae. It is found in Peru.
