= Semniomima astrigalis =

Scientific classification
- Domain: Eukaryota
- Kingdom: Animalia
- Phylum: Arthropoda
- Class: Insecta
- Order: Lepidoptera
- Family: Crambidae
- Genus: Semniomima
- Species: S. astrigalis

Binomial name
- Semniomima astrigalis (Dognin, 1906)

Synonyms
- Noctuelia astrigalis Dognin, 1906

Species of moth

Semniomima astrigalis is a moth in the family Crambidae. It is found in Peru.
