= Loxostege unicoloralis =

Scientific classification
- Kingdom: Animalia
- Phylum: Arthropoda
- Clade: Pancrustacea
- Class: Insecta
- Order: Lepidoptera
- Family: Crambidae
- Genus: Loxostege
- Species: L. unicoloralis

Binomial name
- Loxostege unicoloralis (Barnes & McDunnough, 1914)

Synonyms
- Maroa unicoloralis Barnes & McDunnough, 1914

Species of moth

Loxostege unicoloralis is a moth in the family Crambidae. It was described by William Barnes and James Halliday McDunnough in 1914. It is found in North America, where it has been recorded from southeastern California and Arizona.

The wingspan is about 23 mm. The wings uniform pale creamy white. Adults have been recorded on wing from May to July.
