= Semniomima puella =

Scientific classification
- Kingdom: Animalia
- Phylum: Arthropoda
- Class: Insecta
- Order: Lepidoptera
- Family: Crambidae
- Genus: Semniomima
- Species: S. puella

Binomial name
- Semniomima puella (Walker, 1856)

Synonyms
- Scea puella Walker, 1856; Semniomima albiapicalis Warren

Species of moth

Semniomima puella is a moth in the family Crambidae. It is found in Brazil.
