= Loxostege egregialis =

Scientific classification
- Kingdom: Animalia
- Phylum: Arthropoda
- Clade: Pancrustacea
- Class: Insecta
- Order: Lepidoptera
- Family: Crambidae
- Genus: Loxostege
- Species: L. egregialis

Binomial name
- Loxostege egregialis Munroe, 1976

Species of moth

Loxostege egregialis is a moth in the family Crambidae. It was described by Eugene G. Munroe in 1976. It is found in North America, where it has been recorded from southern Arizona and New Mexico.
