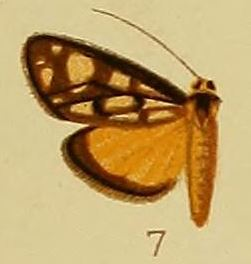
- Loxostege flavingralis

Scientific classification
- Kingdom: Animalia
- Phylum: Arthropoda
- Clade: Pancrustacea
- Class: Insecta
- Order: Lepidoptera
- Family: Crambidae
- Genus: Loxostege
- Species: L. flavinigralis

Binomial name
- Loxostege flavinigralis (Hampson, 1910)

Synonyms
- Phlyctaenodes flavinigralis Hampson, 1910

= Loxostege flavinigralis =

Species of moth

Loxostege flavinigralis is a moth in the family Crambidae. It was described by George Hampson in 1910. It is found in Zambia.
