= Loxostege kearfottalis =

Scientific classification
- Kingdom: Animalia
- Phylum: Arthropoda
- Clade: Pancrustacea
- Class: Insecta
- Order: Lepidoptera
- Family: Crambidae
- Genus: Loxostege
- Species: L. kearfottalis

Binomial name
- Loxostege kearfottalis Walter, 1928

Species of moth

Loxostege kearfottalis is a moth in the family Crambidae. It was described by E. V. Walter in 1928. It is found in North America, where it has been recorded from California to western Texas and in Colorado.

The wingspan is about 21 mm. Adults have been recorded on wing from April to May and again from August to September.
