= Semniomima mediana =

Scientific classification
- Domain: Eukaryota
- Kingdom: Animalia
- Phylum: Arthropoda
- Class: Insecta
- Order: Lepidoptera
- Family: Crambidae
- Genus: Semniomima
- Species: S. mediana

Binomial name
- Semniomima mediana Schaus, 1904

Species of moth

Semniomima mediana is a moth in the family Crambidae. It was described by Schaus in 1904. It is found in Brazil (Parana).
