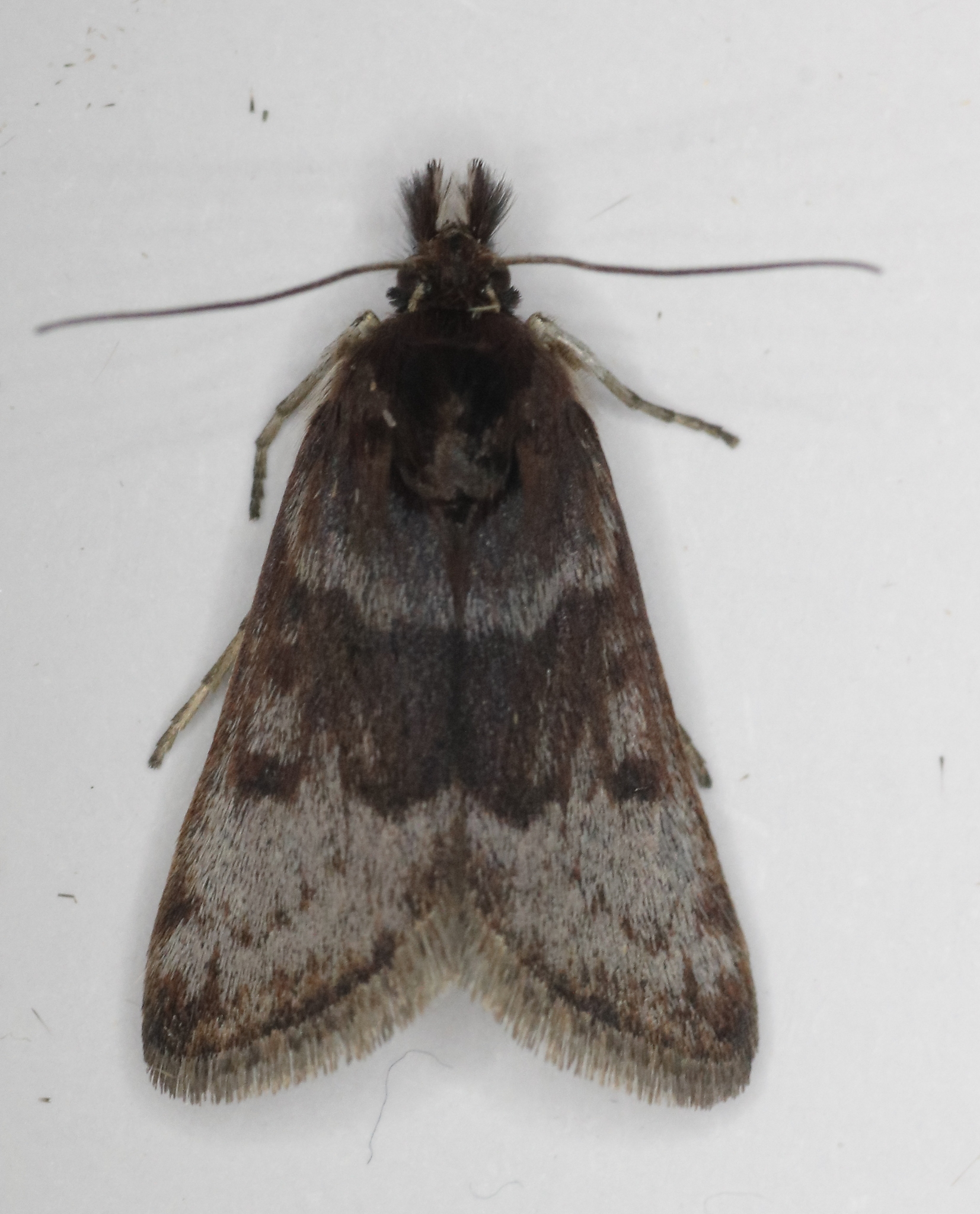

Scientific classification
- Kingdom: Animalia
- Phylum: Arthropoda
- Clade: Pancrustacea
- Class: Insecta
- Order: Lepidoptera
- Family: Crambidae
- Genus: Loxostege
- Species: L. ephippialis

Binomial name
- Loxostege ephippialis (Zetterstedt, 1839)

Synonyms
- List: Botys ephippialis Zetterstedt, 1839; Titanio ephippialis; Boreophila frigidalis Guenée, 1854; Boreophila scandinavialis Guenée, 1854; Loxostege dubitaria Zetterstedt, 1839

= Loxostege ephippialis =

Species of moth

Loxostege ephippialis is a species of moth in the family Crambidae. It was described by Johan Wilhelm Zetterstedt in 1839. It is found in Norway, Sweden, Finland, Russia and North America (from Labrador west to the Northwest Territories and the Rocky Mountains and south to Wyoming and Colorado).

== Description ==
The wingspan is 16–21 mm (0.63–0.83 in). The ground colour of the wings is bluish gray. Adults are on wing from June to mid July in both North America and Europe.
