= Loxostege sedakowialis =

Scientific classification
- Kingdom: Animalia
- Phylum: Arthropoda
- Clade: Pancrustacea
- Class: Insecta
- Order: Lepidoptera
- Family: Crambidae
- Genus: Loxostege
- Species: L. sedakowialis

Binomial name
- Loxostege sedakowialis (Eversmann, 1852)

Synonyms
- Botys sedakowialis Eversmann, 1852; Loxostege bashgulalis Amsel, 1970

Species of moth

Loxostege sedakowialis is a moth in the family Crambidae. It was described by Eduard Friedrich Eversmann in 1852. It is found in Russia and Afghanistan.
