= Loxostege brunneitincta =

Scientific classification
- Kingdom: Animalia
- Phylum: Arthropoda
- Clade: Pancrustacea
- Class: Insecta
- Order: Lepidoptera
- Family: Crambidae
- Genus: Loxostege
- Species: L. brunneitincta

Binomial name
- Loxostege brunneitincta Munroe, 1976

Species of moth

Loxostege brunneitincta is a moth in the family Crambidae. It was described by Eugene G. Munroe in 1976. It is found in North America, where it has been recorded from California, Oregon, Nevada and Colorado.

The wingspan is about 20 mm. Adults have been recorded on wing from May to July.
