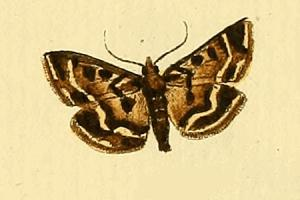

Scientific classification
- Kingdom: Animalia
- Phylum: Arthropoda
- Clade: Pancrustacea
- Class: Insecta
- Order: Lepidoptera
- Family: Crambidae
- Genus: Loxostege
- Species: L. scutalis

Binomial name
- Loxostege scutalis (Hubner, 1813)

Synonyms
- Pyralis scutalis Hubner, 1813; Botys consortalis Herrich-Schäffer, 1855

= Loxostege scutalis =

Species of moth

Loxostege scutalis is a species of moth in the family Crambidae. It is found in France, Spain and Portugal.
