= Semniomima auranticeps =

Scientific classification
- Kingdom: Animalia
- Phylum: Arthropoda
- Class: Insecta
- Order: Lepidoptera
- Family: Crambidae
- Genus: Semniomima
- Species: S. auranticeps

Binomial name
- Semniomima auranticeps (Hampson, 1913)

Synonyms
- Noctuelia auranticeps Hampson, 1913

Species of moth

Semniomima auranticeps is a moth in the family Crambidae. It was described by George Hampson in 1913. It is found in Peru.
