= Loxostege typhonalis =

Scientific classification
- Kingdom: Animalia
- Phylum: Arthropoda
- Clade: Pancrustacea
- Class: Insecta
- Order: Lepidoptera
- Family: Crambidae
- Genus: Loxostege
- Species: L. typhonalis

Binomial name
- Loxostege typhonalis Barnes & McDunnough, 1914

Species of moth

Loxostege typhonalis is a moth in the family Crambidae. It was described by William Barnes and James Halliday McDunnough in 1914. It is found in North America, where it has been recorded from Arizona and New Mexico.

The wingspan is 18–20 mm. The forewings are ocherous brown. The hindwings are pale ocherous, but darker at the margins. Adults are on wing from July to September.
