= Loxostege confusalis =

Scientific classification
- Kingdom: Animalia
- Phylum: Arthropoda
- Clade: Pancrustacea
- Class: Insecta
- Order: Lepidoptera
- Family: Crambidae
- Genus: Loxostege
- Species: L. confusalis

Binomial name
- Loxostege confusalis (South in Leech & South, 1901)

Synonyms
- Phlyctaenodes confusalis South in Leech & South, 1901

Species of moth

Loxostege confusalis is a moth in the family Crambidae. It was described by South in 1901. It is found in western China.
