= Loxostege albifascialis =

Scientific classification
- Kingdom: Animalia
- Phylum: Arthropoda
- Clade: Pancrustacea
- Class: Insecta
- Order: Lepidoptera
- Family: Crambidae
- Genus: Loxostege
- Species: L. albifascialis

Binomial name
- Loxostege albifascialis (Walsingham & Hampson, 1896)

Synonyms
- Eurycreon albifascialis Walsingham & Hampson, 1896

Species of moth

Loxostege albifascialis is a moth in the family Crambidae. It was described by Walsingham and Hampson in 1896. It is found in Yemen.
