= Loxostege oblinalis =

Scientific classification
- Kingdom: Animalia
- Phylum: Arthropoda
- Clade: Pancrustacea
- Class: Insecta
- Order: Lepidoptera
- Family: Crambidae
- Genus: Loxostege
- Species: L. oblinalis

Binomial name
- Loxostege oblinalis (C. Felder, R. Felder & Rogenhofer, 1875)

Synonyms
- Botys oblinalis C. Felder, R. Felder & Rogenhofer, 1875

Species of moth

Loxostege oblinalis is a moth in the family Crambidae. It was described by Cajetan Felder, Rudolf Felder and Alois Friedrich Rogenhofer in 1875. It is found in the Democratic Republic of the Congo and South Africa.
