= Loxostege aemulalis =

Scientific classification
- Kingdom: Animalia
- Phylum: Arthropoda
- Clade: Pancrustacea
- Class: Insecta
- Order: Lepidoptera
- Family: Crambidae
- Genus: Loxostege
- Species: L. aemulalis

Binomial name
- Loxostege aemulalis (Dognin, 1905)

Synonyms
- Phlyctaenodes aemulalis Dognin, 1905

Species of moth

Loxostege aemulalis is a moth in the family Crambidae. It was described by Paul Dognin in 1905. It is found in Bolivia.

The wingspan is about 23 mm. The forewings are uniform smoky fuscous. The hindwings are ochreous orange with a smoky-fuscous border on the costa and outer margin. Adults have been recorded on wing in June.
