= Loxostege galbula =

Scientific classification
- Kingdom: Animalia
- Phylum: Arthropoda
- Clade: Pancrustacea
- Class: Insecta
- Order: Lepidoptera
- Family: Crambidae
- Genus: Loxostege
- Species: L. galbula

Binomial name
- Loxostege galbula (C. Felder, R. Felder & Rogenhofer, 1875)

Synonyms
- Botys galbula C. Felder, R. Felder & Rogenhofer, 1875

Species of moth

Loxostege galbula is a moth in the family Crambidae. It was described by Cajetan Felder, Rudolf Felder and Alois Friedrich Rogenhofer in 1875. It is found in Colombia.
