= Loxostege venustalis =

Scientific classification
- Kingdom: Animalia
- Phylum: Arthropoda
- Clade: Pancrustacea
- Class: Insecta
- Order: Lepidoptera
- Family: Crambidae
- Genus: Loxostege
- Species: L. venustalis

Binomial name
- Loxostege venustalis (Stoll in Cramer & Stoll, 1781)

Synonyms
- Phalaena Pyralis venustalis Stoll in Cramer & Stoll, 1781; Botys divulsalis Zeller, 1852; Emmelia testula Geyer in Hübner, 1837; Scopula jucundalis Walker, 1866

Species of moth

Loxostege venustalis is a moth in the family Crambidae. It was described by Stoll in 1781. It is found in Lesotho, Malawi, Mozambique, South Africa, Zambia and Zimbabwe.
