= Loxostege heliosalis =

Scientific classification
- Kingdom: Animalia
- Phylum: Arthropoda
- Clade: Pancrustacea
- Class: Insecta
- Order: Lepidoptera
- Family: Crambidae
- Genus: Loxostege
- Species: L. heliosalis

Binomial name
- Loxostege heliosalis (Hampson, 1912)

Synonyms
- Lygropia heliosalis Hampson, 1912

Species of moth

Loxostege heliosalis is a moth in the family Crambidae. It was described by George Hampson in 1912. It is found in Argentina.
