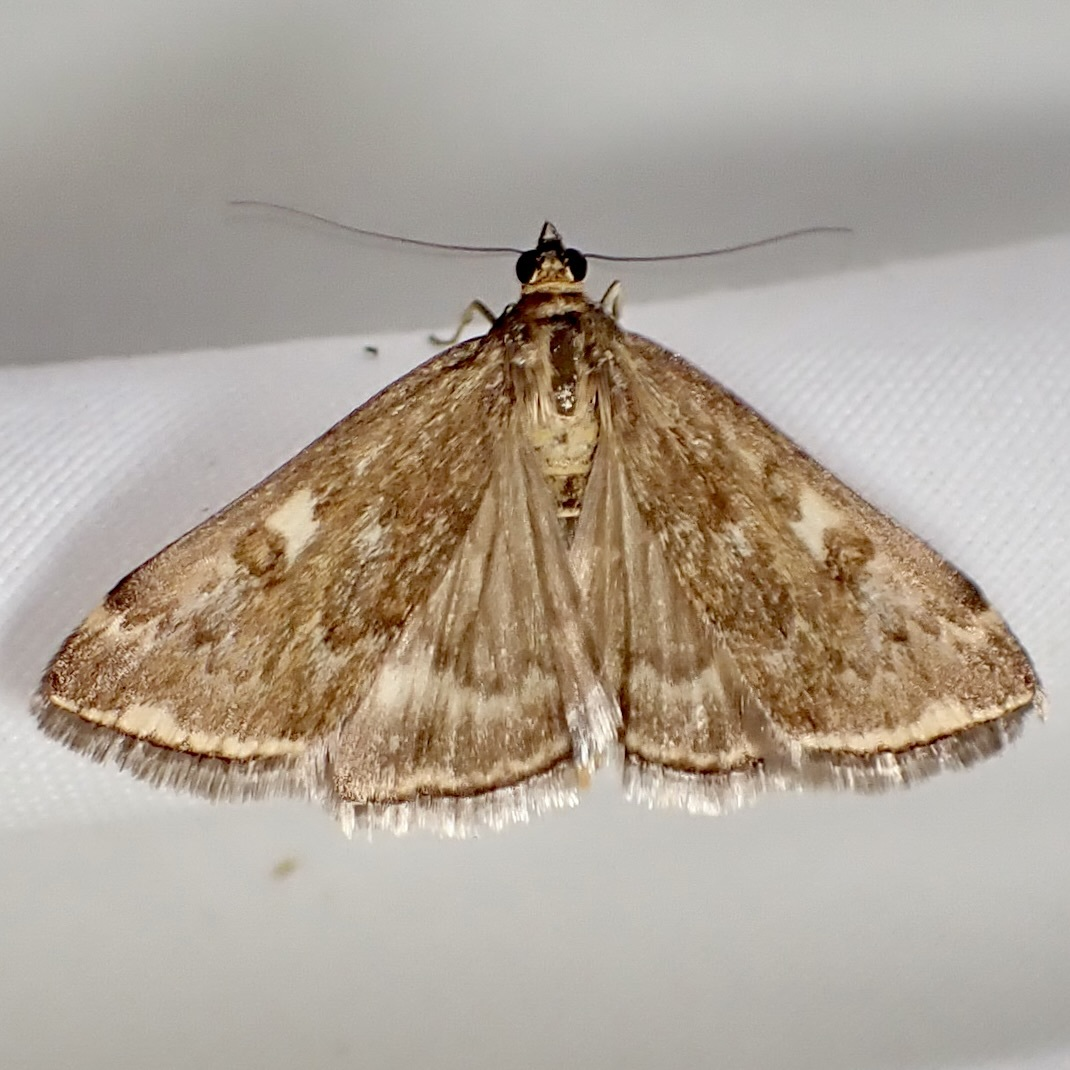
- Loxostege munroealis, México

Scientific classification
- Kingdom: Animalia
- Phylum: Arthropoda
- Clade: Pancrustacea
- Class: Insecta
- Order: Lepidoptera
- Family: Crambidae
- Genus: Loxostege
- Species: L. munroealis

Binomial name
- Loxostege munroealis Leraut, 2005

= Loxostege munroealis =

Species of moth

Loxostege munroealis is a moth in the family Crambidae. It was described by Patrice J.A. Leraut in 2005. It is found in North America, where it has been recorded from British Columbia.
