= Loxostege expansalis =

Scientific classification
- Kingdom: Animalia
- Phylum: Arthropoda
- Clade: Pancrustacea
- Class: Insecta
- Order: Lepidoptera
- Family: Crambidae
- Genus: Loxostege
- Species: L. expansalis

Binomial name
- Loxostege expansalis (Eversmann, 1852)

Synonyms
- Hercyna expansalis Eversmann, 1852

Species of moth

Loxostege Sticticalis is a species of moth in the family Crambidae. It is found in Russia.

== Description ==
Loxostege Sticticalis is an {?}ight brown butterfly with white yellow stripes on its wings. The body length of the moth is 10–12 mm, the wingspan is 19–26 mm. The oval-shaped and shiny egg is transparent and colorless at first, but then turns orange yellow and it turns gray near the exit of the larva. These eggs are usually 0.8 - 1.0 mm long. The body length of the first instar larva is 1.5-2.5 mm., in the second instar 3.0 - 5.5 mm, in the third instar 8.0-10.0 mm, in the fourth instar 9.0 - 12.0 mm. and the body length of the last stage larva is 18.0 - 25.0 mm.

The grown larva is green to black in color, with light and dark stripes extending across its back and sides. It spends the winter as a grown larva in the pupal cocoon at a depth of 5 – 7 cm in the soil. These larvas become pupa as they enter spring. The pupal period is 14–18 days, and the first 4–5 days of this is called the prepupa period. The first growns begin to fly in mid-April.

These moths are active at night and immobile during the day. Female moths, which can feed on pollen dust and nectar, live up to two weeks and also a female moth lays an average of 60 - 400 eggs. Those who cannot find these nutrients cannot lay eggs even if they live for two months. Eggs are laid on the underside of leaves especially Chenopodium and other weeds. The larva that emerges from the egg begins to feed on these plants. In addition, a larva consumes 0.6 grams of food in its entire life.

== Distribution ==
Loxostege Sticticalis have been found in the Marmara, Aegean and Black Sea.
