= Semniomima polypaetalis =

Scientific classification
- Domain: Eukaryota
- Kingdom: Animalia
- Phylum: Arthropoda
- Class: Insecta
- Order: Lepidoptera
- Family: Crambidae
- Genus: Semniomima
- Species: S. polypaetalis

Binomial name
- Semniomima polypaetalis (Schaus, 1920)

Synonyms
- Psara polypaetalis Schaus, 1920

Species of moth

Semniomima polypaetalis is a moth in the family Crambidae. It was described by Schaus in 1920. It is found in Brazil (São Paulo).
