= Loxostege caradjana =

Scientific classification
- Kingdom: Animalia
- Phylum: Arthropoda
- Clade: Pancrustacea
- Class: Insecta
- Order: Lepidoptera
- Family: Crambidae
- Genus: Loxostege
- Species: L. caradjana

Binomial name
- Loxostege caradjana (Popescu-Gorj, 1991)

Synonyms
- Margaritia caradjana Popescu-Gorj, 1991

Species of moth

Loxostege caradjana is a moth in the family Crambidae. It was described by Aurelian Popescu-Gorj in 1991. It is found in Sichuan, China.
