= Loxostege tesselalis =

Scientific classification
- Kingdom: Animalia
- Phylum: Arthropoda
- Clade: Pancrustacea
- Class: Insecta
- Order: Lepidoptera
- Family: Crambidae
- Genus: Loxostege
- Species: L. tesselalis

Binomial name
- Loxostege tesselalis (Guenee, 1854)

Synonyms
- Spilodes tesselalis Guenee, 1854

Species of moth

Loxostege tesselalis is a species of moth in the family Crambidae. It is found in France, Spain and on Corsica.

The wingspan is 26–28 mm.
