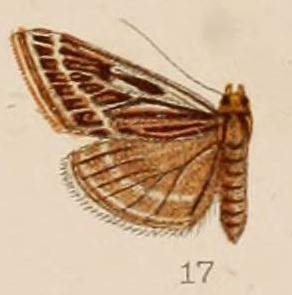
- Loxostege leuconeuralis

Scientific classification
- Kingdom: Animalia
- Phylum: Arthropoda
- Clade: Pancrustacea
- Class: Insecta
- Order: Lepidoptera
- Family: Crambidae
- Genus: Loxostege
- Species: L. leuconeuralis

Binomial name
- Loxostege leuconeuralis (Hampson, 1908)

Synonyms
- Phlyctaenodes leuconeuralis Hampson, 1908

= Loxostege leuconeuralis =

Species of moth

Loxostege leuconeuralis is a species of moth in the family Crambidae. It is found in Afghanistan.

This species has a wingspan of 32mm.
