= Loxostege minimalis =

Scientific classification
- Kingdom: Animalia
- Phylum: Arthropoda
- Clade: Pancrustacea
- Class: Insecta
- Order: Lepidoptera
- Family: Crambidae
- Genus: Loxostege
- Species: L. minimalis

Binomial name
- Loxostege minimalis Amsel, 1956

Species of moth

Loxostege minimalis is a moth in the family Crambidae. It was described by Hans Georg Amsel in 1956 and is found in Venezuela.
