= Loxostege annaphilalis =

Scientific classification
- Kingdom: Animalia
- Phylum: Arthropoda
- Clade: Pancrustacea
- Class: Insecta
- Order: Lepidoptera
- Family: Crambidae
- Genus: Loxostege
- Species: L. annaphilalis

Binomial name
- Loxostege annaphilalis (Grote, 1881)

Synonyms
- Botis annaphilalis Grote, 1881

Species of moth

Loxostege annaphilalis is a moth in the family Crambidae. It was described by Augustus Radcliffe Grote in 1881. It is found in North America, where it has been recorded from south-western California, from Kern County to San Diego County.
