= Loxostege farsalis =

Scientific classification
- Kingdom: Animalia
- Phylum: Arthropoda
- Clade: Pancrustacea
- Class: Insecta
- Order: Lepidoptera
- Family: Crambidae
- Genus: Loxostege
- Species: L. farsalis

Binomial name
- Loxostege farsalis Amsel, 1950

Species of moth

Loxostege farsalis is a moth in the family Crambidae. It was described by Hans Georg Amsel in 1950 and is found in Iran.
