= Loxostege thrallophilalis =

Scientific classification
- Kingdom: Animalia
- Phylum: Arthropoda
- Clade: Pancrustacea
- Class: Insecta
- Order: Lepidoptera
- Family: Crambidae
- Genus: Loxostege
- Species: L. thrallophilalis

Binomial name
- Loxostege thrallophilalis (Hulst, 1886)

Synonyms
- Botis thrallophilalis Hulst, 1886; Loxostege thallophilalis; Noctuelia flavifimbrialis Warren, 1892

Species of moth

Loxostege thrallophilalis is a moth in the family Crambidae. It was described by George Duryea Hulst in 1886. It is found in North America, where it has been recorded from southern British Columbia to northern California, as well as from Montana.

The wingspan is about 24 mm. The forewings are dark rich brown with black lines. The hindwings are brown with a black border.
