= Loxostege xuthusalis =

Scientific classification
- Kingdom: Animalia
- Phylum: Arthropoda
- Clade: Pancrustacea
- Class: Insecta
- Order: Lepidoptera
- Family: Crambidae
- Genus: Loxostege
- Species: L. xuthusalis

Binomial name
- Loxostege xuthusalis (Hampson in Elwes, Hampson & Durrant, 1906)

Synonyms
- Phlyctaenodes xuthusalis Hampson in Elwes, Hampson & Durrant, 1906

Species of moth

Loxostege xuthusalis is a moth in the family Crambidae. It was described by George Hampson in 1906. It is found in Tibet, China.
