= Loxostege bicoloralis =

Scientific classification
- Kingdom: Animalia
- Phylum: Arthropoda
- Clade: Pancrustacea
- Class: Insecta
- Order: Lepidoptera
- Family: Crambidae
- Genus: Loxostege
- Species: L. bicoloralis

Binomial name
- Loxostege bicoloralis Warren, 1892

Synonyms
- Phlyctaenodes flavivenalis Hampson, 1913; Loxostege osthelderi Schawerda, 1932

Species of moth

Loxostege bicoloralis is a moth in the family Crambidae. It was described by Warren in 1892. It is found in Iraq.
