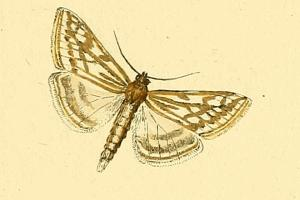

Scientific classification
- Kingdom: Animalia
- Phylum: Arthropoda
- Clade: Pancrustacea
- Class: Insecta
- Order: Lepidoptera
- Family: Crambidae
- Genus: Loxostege
- Species: L. clathralis

Binomial name
- Loxostege clathralis (Hubner, 1813)

Synonyms
- Pyralis clathralis Hubner, 1813; Loxostege clathralis aksualis Caradja, 1916; Scopula lathralis Duponchel, 1832; Loxostege clathralis ab. nivalis Caradja, 1916; Spilodes tessellalis Guenée, 1854; Botys granatalis Staudinger, 1859

= Loxostege clathralis =

Species of moth

Loxostege clathralis is a species of moth in the family Crambidae. It is found from Europe (Croatia, Romania, Ukraine and Russia), through Central Asia (including Kazakhstan) to China.
