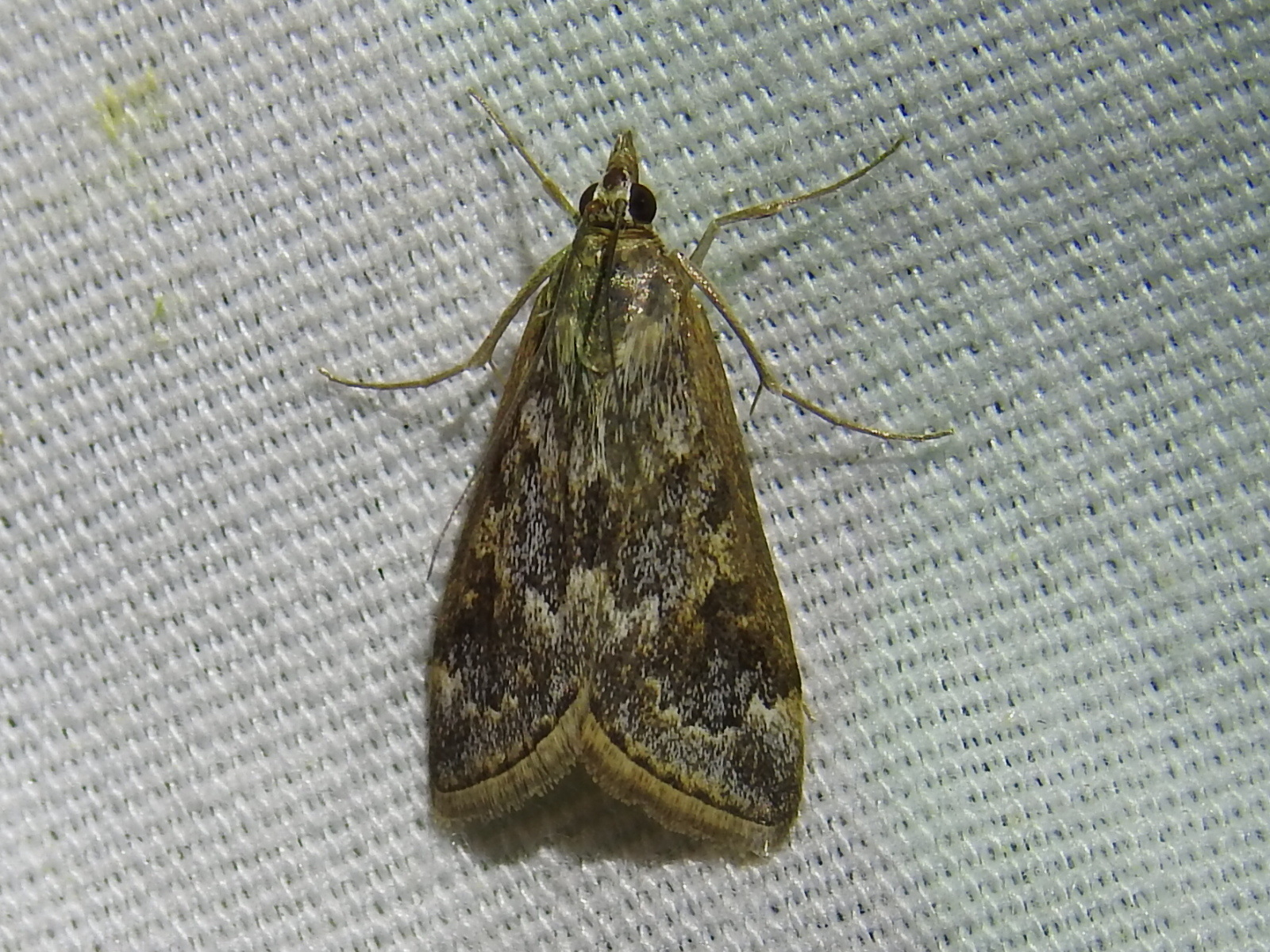

Scientific classification
- Kingdom: Animalia
- Phylum: Arthropoda
- Clade: Pancrustacea
- Class: Insecta
- Order: Lepidoptera
- Family: Crambidae
- Genus: Loxostege
- Species: L. allectalis

Binomial name
- Loxostege allectalis (Grote, 1877)

Synonyms
- Botis allectalis Grote, 1877; Eurycreon perplexalis Fernald, 1885

= Loxostege allectalis =

Species of moth

Loxostege allectalis is a moth in the family Crambidae. It was described by Augustus Radcliffe Grote in 1877. It is found in the United States, where it has been recorded from southern California to Texas, and to Central America.

The wingspan is 21–26 mm. Adults are on wing from March to September.

The larvae feed on Lycium berlandieri.
