= Loxostege impeditalis =

Scientific classification
- Kingdom: Animalia
- Phylum: Arthropoda
- Clade: Pancrustacea
- Class: Insecta
- Order: Lepidoptera
- Family: Crambidae
- Genus: Loxostege
- Species: L. impeditalis

Binomial name
- Loxostege impeditalis (Maassen, 1890)

Synonyms
- Botys impeditalis Maassen, 1890

Species of moth

Loxostege impeditalis is a moth in the family Crambidae. It was described by Peter Maassen in 1890. It is found in Ecuador.
