= Loxostege oberthuralis =

Scientific classification
- Kingdom: Animalia
- Phylum: Arthropoda
- Clade: Pancrustacea
- Class: Insecta
- Order: Lepidoptera
- Family: Crambidae
- Genus: Loxostege
- Species: L. oberthuralis

Binomial name
- Loxostege oberthuralis Fernald, 1894

Species of moth

Loxostege oberthuralis is a moth in the family Crambidae. It was described by Charles H. Fernald in 1894. It is found in North America, where it has been recorded from southern California, southern Arizona and southern Nevada.

The wingspan is about 32 mm. The forewings are pale pale sulfur yellow, marked with reddish brown. The hindwings are white with a fuscous terminal line.
