= Semniomima =

Scientific classification
- Kingdom: Animalia
- Phylum: Arthropoda
- Class: Insecta
- Order: Lepidoptera
- Family: Crambidae
- Subfamily: Pyraustinae
- Genus: Semniomima; Warren, 1892

Genus of moths

Semniomima is a genus of moths of the family Crambidae.

== Species ==
- Semniomima anubisalis
- Semniomima astrigalis
- Semniomima auranticeps (Hampson, 1913)
- Semniomima clarissalis
- Semniomima flaviceps Burmeister, 1878
- Semniomima fuscivenalis (Schaus, 1920)
- Semniomima josialis (Hampson, 1918)
- Semniomima ligatalis
- Semniomima mediana Schaus, 1904
- Semniomima mesozonalis (Hampson, 1913)
- Semniomima peruensis (Capps, 1967)
- Semniomima polypaetalis (Schaus, 1920)
- Semniomima polystrigalis
- Semniomima puella
- Semniomima tristrigalis (Hampson, 1913)
