= Loxostege oculifera =

Scientific classification
- Kingdom: Animalia
- Phylum: Arthropoda
- Clade: Pancrustacea
- Class: Insecta
- Order: Lepidoptera
- Family: Crambidae
- Genus: Loxostege
- Species: L. oculifera

Binomial name
- Loxostege oculifera (E. Hering, 1901)

Synonyms
- Eurycreon oculifera E. Hering, 1901; Phlyctaenodes subvitrealis Hampson, 1903

Species of moth

Loxostege oculifera is a moth in the family Crambidae. It was described by E. Hering in 1901. It is found in Sri Lanka and on Sumatra.
