= Loxostege ochrealis =

Scientific classification
- Kingdom: Animalia
- Phylum: Arthropoda
- Clade: Pancrustacea
- Class: Insecta
- Order: Lepidoptera
- Family: Crambidae
- Genus: Loxostege
- Species: L. ochrealis

Binomial name
- Loxostege ochrealis (Wileman, 1911)

Synonyms
- Phlyctaenodes ochrealis Wileman, 1911

Species of moth

Loxostege ochrealis is a moth in the family Crambidae. It was described by Alfred Ernest Wileman in 1911. It is found in Japan.
