= Loxostege badakschanalis =

Scientific classification
- Kingdom: Animalia
- Phylum: Arthropoda
- Clade: Pancrustacea
- Class: Insecta
- Order: Lepidoptera
- Family: Crambidae
- Genus: Loxostege
- Species: L. badakschanalis

Binomial name
- Loxostege badakschanalis (Amsel, 1970)

Synonyms
- Boreophila badakschanalis Amsel, 1970

Species of moth

Loxostege badakschanalis is a moth in the family Crambidae. It was described by Hans Georg Amsel in 1970 and is found in Afghanistan.
