= Loxostege subcuprea =

Scientific classification
- Kingdom: Animalia
- Phylum: Arthropoda
- Clade: Pancrustacea
- Class: Insecta
- Order: Lepidoptera
- Family: Crambidae
- Genus: Loxostege
- Species: L. subcuprea

Binomial name
- Loxostege subcuprea (Dognin, 1906)

Synonyms
- Lygropia subcuprea Dognin, 1906

Species of moth

Loxostege subcuprea is a moth in the family Crambidae. It was described by Paul Dognin in 1906. It is found in Argentina (Salta and Tucumán).

The wingspan is about 20 mm. The forewings and hindwings are uniform orange with fuscous margins. Adults have been recorded on wing in February.
