= Loxostege nissalis =

Scientific classification
- Kingdom: Animalia
- Phylum: Arthropoda
- Clade: Pancrustacea
- Class: Insecta
- Order: Lepidoptera
- Family: Crambidae
- Genus: Loxostege
- Species: L. nissalis

Binomial name
- Loxostege nissalis (Amsel, 1961)

Synonyms
- Boreophila nissalis Amsel, 1961

Species of moth

Loxostege nissalis is a moth in the family Crambidae. It was described by Hans Georg Amsel in 1961 and is found in Iran.
