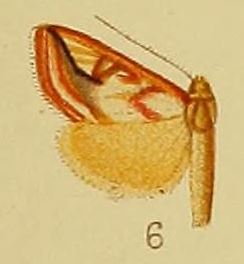
- Loxostege argyrostacta

Scientific classification
- Kingdom: Animalia
- Phylum: Arthropoda
- Clade: Pancrustacea
- Class: Insecta
- Order: Lepidoptera
- Family: Crambidae
- Genus: Loxostege
- Species: L. argyrostacta

Binomial name
- Loxostege argyrostacta (Hampson, 1910)

Synonyms
- Phlyctaenodes argyrostacta Hampson, 1910

= Loxostege argyrostacta =

Species of moth

Loxostege argyrostacta is a moth in the family Crambidae. It was described by George Hampson in 1910. It is found in the Democratic Republic of the Congo and Zambia.
