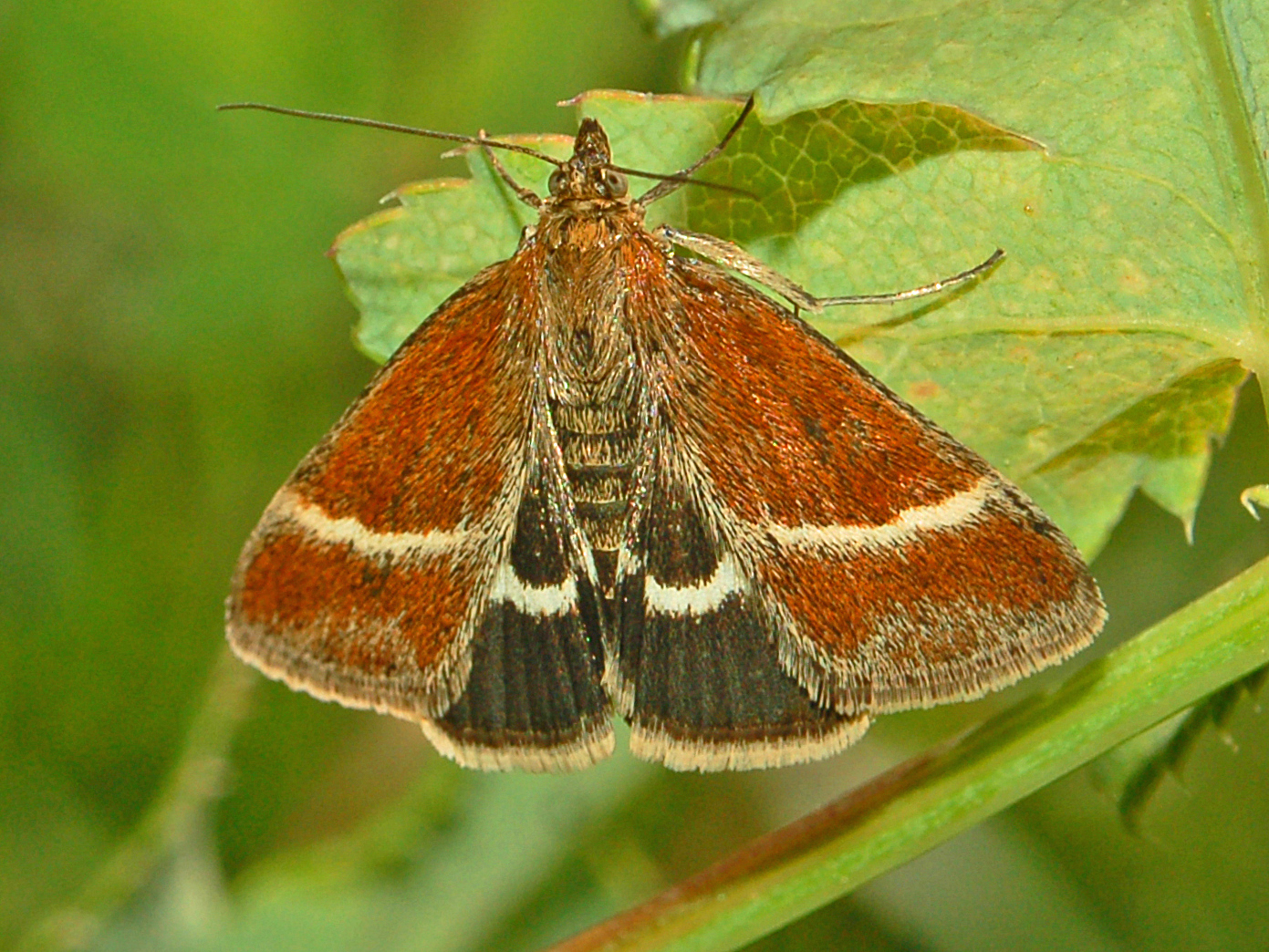
- A live individual of Loxostege fascialis
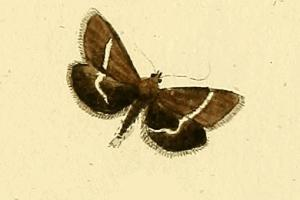
- Illustration of Loxostege fascialis

Scientific classification
- Kingdom: Animalia
- Phylum: Arthropoda
- Clade: Pancrustacea
- Class: Insecta
- Order: Lepidoptera
- Family: Crambidae
- Genus: Loxostege
- Species: L. fascialis

Binomial name
- Loxostege fascialis (Hubner, 1796)

Synonyms
- Pyralis fascialis Hubner, 1796; Pyralis fascialis Haworth, [1803]; Meridiophila fascialis

= Loxostege fascialis =

Species of moth

Loxostege fascialis is a species of moth in the family Crambidae. It is found in France, Spain, Italy, Austria, Slovakia, Hungary, Croatia, Bosnia and Herzegovina, Romania and Russia.
