= Loxostege peltalis =

Scientific classification
- Kingdom: Animalia
- Phylum: Arthropoda
- Clade: Pancrustacea
- Class: Insecta
- Order: Lepidoptera
- Family: Crambidae
- Genus: Loxostege
- Species: L. peltalis

Binomial name
- Loxostege peltalis (Eversmann, 1842)

Synonyms
- Pyrausta peltalis Eversmann, 1842

Species of moth

Loxostege peltalis is a species of moth in the family Crambidae. It is found in Russia.
