= Loxostege peltaloides =

Scientific classification
- Kingdom: Animalia
- Phylum: Arthropoda
- Clade: Pancrustacea
- Class: Insecta
- Order: Lepidoptera
- Family: Crambidae
- Genus: Loxostege
- Species: L. peltaloides

Binomial name
- Loxostege peltaloides (Rebel in Wagner, 1932)

Synonyms
- Eurycreon peltaloides Rebel in Wagner, 1932

Species of moth

Loxostege peltaloides is a moth in the family Crambidae. It was described by Rebel in Wagner in 1932. It is found in Turkey.
