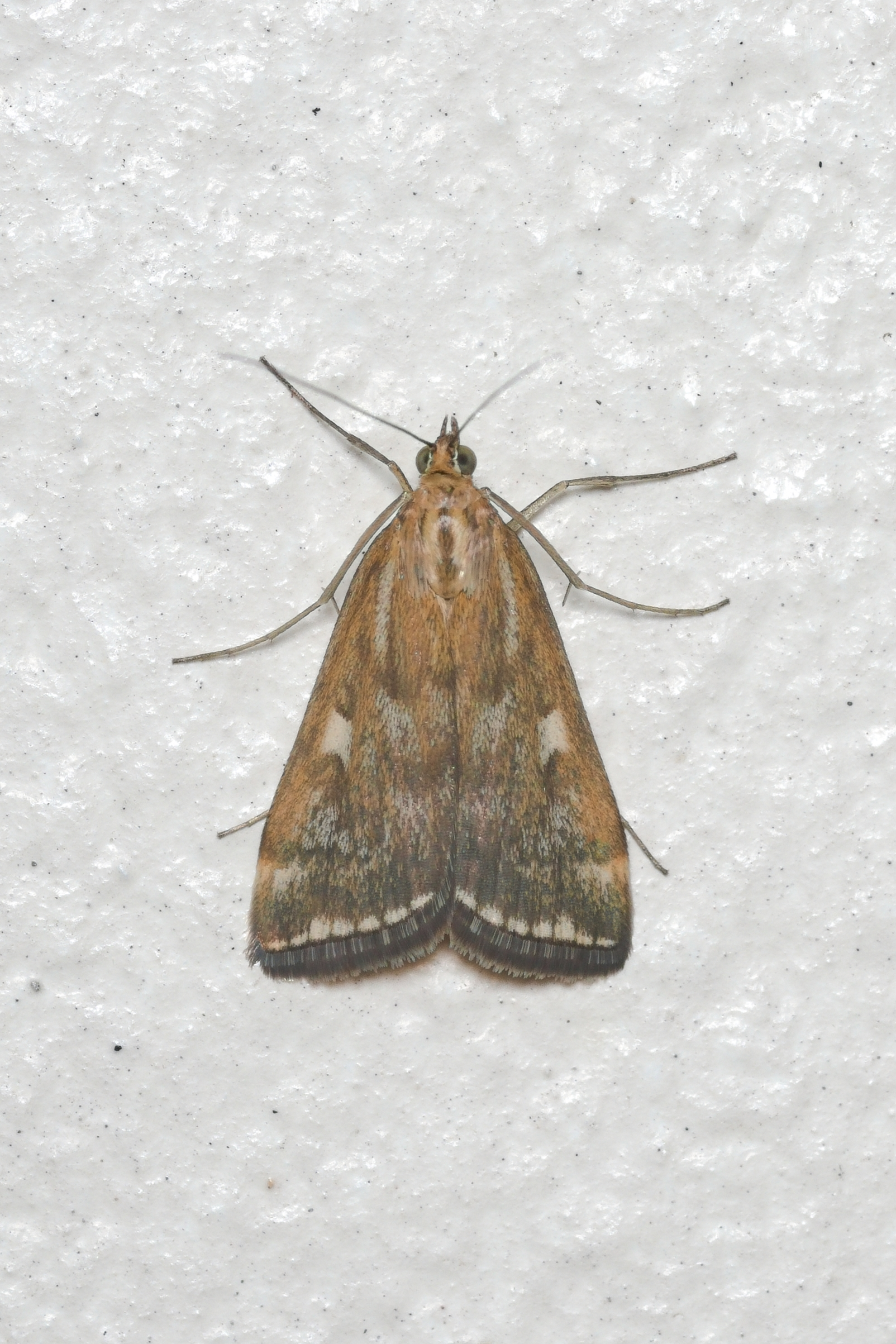

Scientific classification
- Kingdom: Animalia
- Phylum: Arthropoda
- Clade: Pancrustacea
- Class: Insecta
- Order: Lepidoptera
- Family: Crambidae
- Genus: Loxostege
- Species: L. sticticalis

Binomial name
- Loxostege sticticalis (Linnaeus, 1761)

Synonyms
- List: Phalaena Pyralis sticticalis Linnaeus, 1761; Pyralis fuscalis Hübner, 1796; Pyralis lupulina Clerck, 1764; Botys lupulinalis Guenée, 1854; Phalaena Tortrix miana O. F. Müller, 1764; Pyralis tetragonalis Haworth, 1811; Pyralis sylvata Panzer, 1804; Loxostege sticticalis tenebrosa Caradja, 1939

= Loxostege sticticalis =

Species of moth

Loxostege sticticalis is a species of moth of the family Crambidae. It was first described by Carl Linnaeus in 1761 and is found in the Palearctic and Nearctic realms.

The wingspan is 24–29 millimetres (0.94–1.14 in). The pattern and colour of the wings vary greatly. The ground colour ranges from a light brown to a darker brown to a reddish brown. The darker markings are also very variable; it may have an indistinct inner transverse line, ring, kidney and cone blemishes as well as a usually very distinct, jagged outer transverse line, occasionally other spots also appear in the midfield. This pattern can also be almost completely absent.The forewings can then be almost uniformly grey-brown, with occasionally still faintly indicated individual blemishes. Grey fringes are typical, a dark narrow fringe line towards the base followed by a narrow yellow to whitish transverse band. This is somewhat thickened in the front half (towards the costal edge), but near the middle. Often, in the contact area of the outer transverse line with the costal edge, another bright spot is developed towards the edge of the seam. Very characteristic of most specimens is also a rectangular, concave light spot between the ring and kidney blemish, which is usually present even in specimens with little markings; in extreme cases, however, in almost uniformly grey-brown coloured specimens, it may also be missing. The uppersides of the hind wings are grey with a dark fringing line, which in turn is lined with a narrow light line towards the roots. Often, a more or less complete, relatively wide outer transverse line is also formed. The inner edge may be lightened. The undersides of the forewings and hindwings are yellowish with a broad brown border area and usually two further, broad, brown to dark brown transverse bands.

The moth flies from May to September depending on the location.

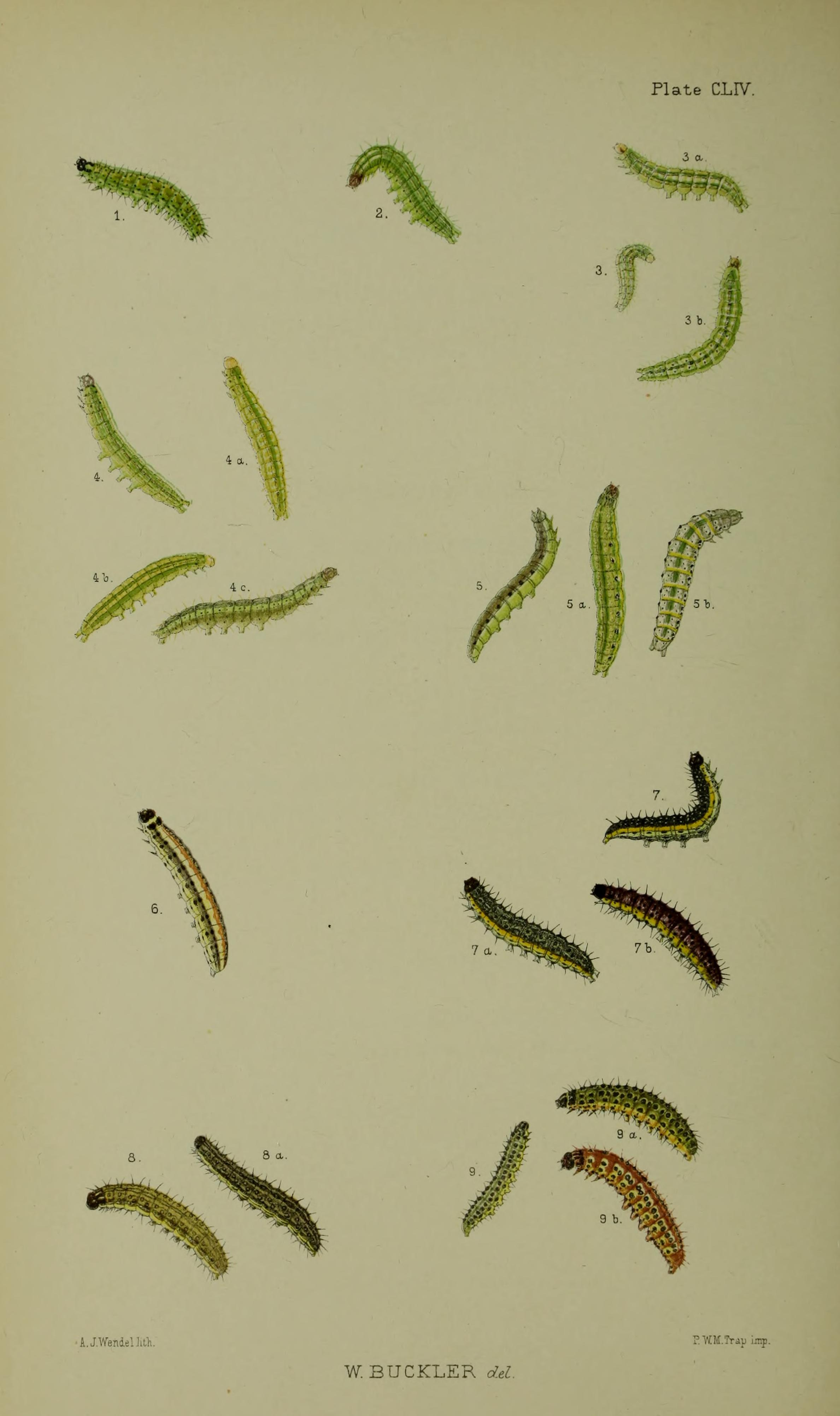
Figs.8, 8a larva after final moult

The larvae feed on various herbaceous plants, such as mugwort (Artemisia vulgaris), beet, Chenopodium album and Artemisia campestris. It can become a pest for sugar beet and tobacco.
