= Loxostege scalaralis =

Scientific classification
- Kingdom: Animalia
- Phylum: Arthropoda
- Clade: Pancrustacea
- Class: Insecta
- Order: Lepidoptera
- Family: Crambidae
- Genus: Loxostege
- Species: L. scalaralis

Binomial name
- Loxostege scalaralis (Christoph, 1877)

Synonyms
- Eurycreon scalaralis Christoph, 1877

Species of moth

Loxostege scalaralis is a moth in the family Crambidae. It was described by Hugo Theodor Christoph in 1877. It is found in Turkmenistan.
