= Loxostege angustipennis =

Scientific classification
- Kingdom: Animalia
- Phylum: Arthropoda
- Clade: Pancrustacea
- Class: Insecta
- Order: Lepidoptera
- Family: Crambidae
- Genus: Loxostege
- Species: L. angustipennis

Binomial name
- Loxostege angustipennis (Zerny, 1914)

Synonyms
- Titanio angustipennis Zerny, 1914

Species of moth

Loxostege angustipennis is a moth in the family Crambidae. It was described by Zerny in 1914. It is found in China (Tian-Shan mountains) and Turkmenistan.
