= Semniomima tristrigalis =

Scientific classification
- Kingdom: Animalia
- Phylum: Arthropoda
- Class: Insecta
- Order: Lepidoptera
- Family: Crambidae
- Genus: Semniomima
- Species: S. tristrigalis

Binomial name
- Semniomima tristrigalis (Hampson, 1913)

Synonyms
- Noctuelia tristrigalis Hampson, 1913

Species of moth

Semniomima tristrigalis is a moth in the family Crambidae. It was described by George Hampson in 1913. It is found in Paraná, Brazil.
