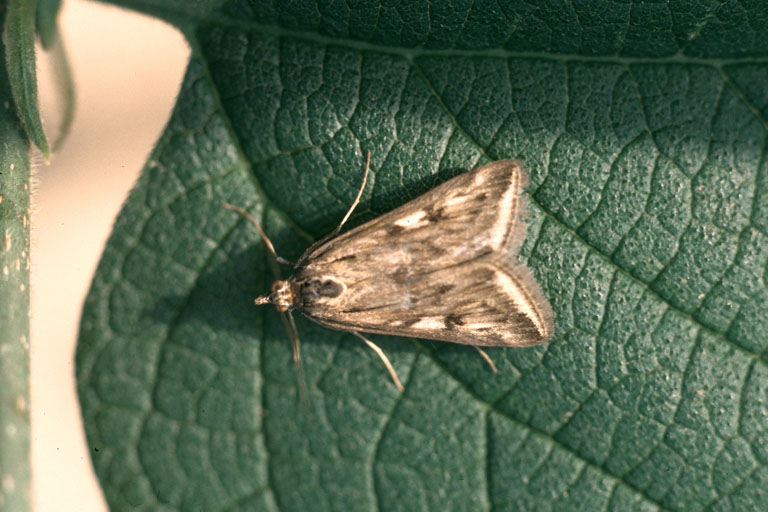

Scientific classification
- Kingdom: Animalia
- Phylum: Arthropoda
- Clade: Pancrustacea
- Class: Insecta
- Order: Lepidoptera
- Family: Crambidae
- Genus: Loxostege
- Species: L. cereralis

Binomial name
- Loxostege cereralis (Zeller, 1872)

Synonyms
- Eurycreon cereralis Zeller, 1872; Loxostege cerealis

= Loxostege cereralis =

Species of moth

Loxostege cereralis, the alfalfa webworm, is a species of moth of the family Crambidae. It is found from Quebec to British Columbia, south to Mexico in the west.

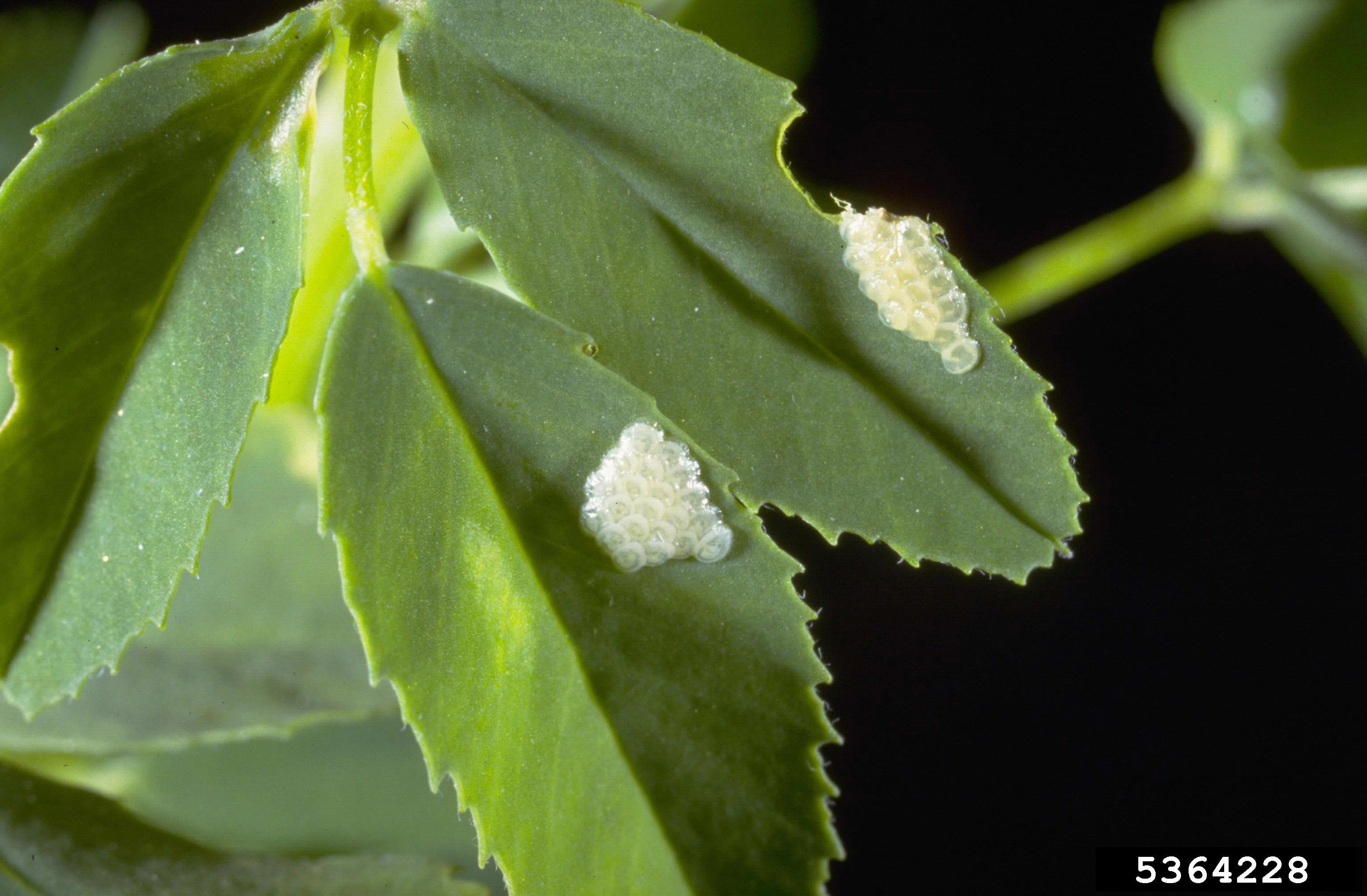
Eggs

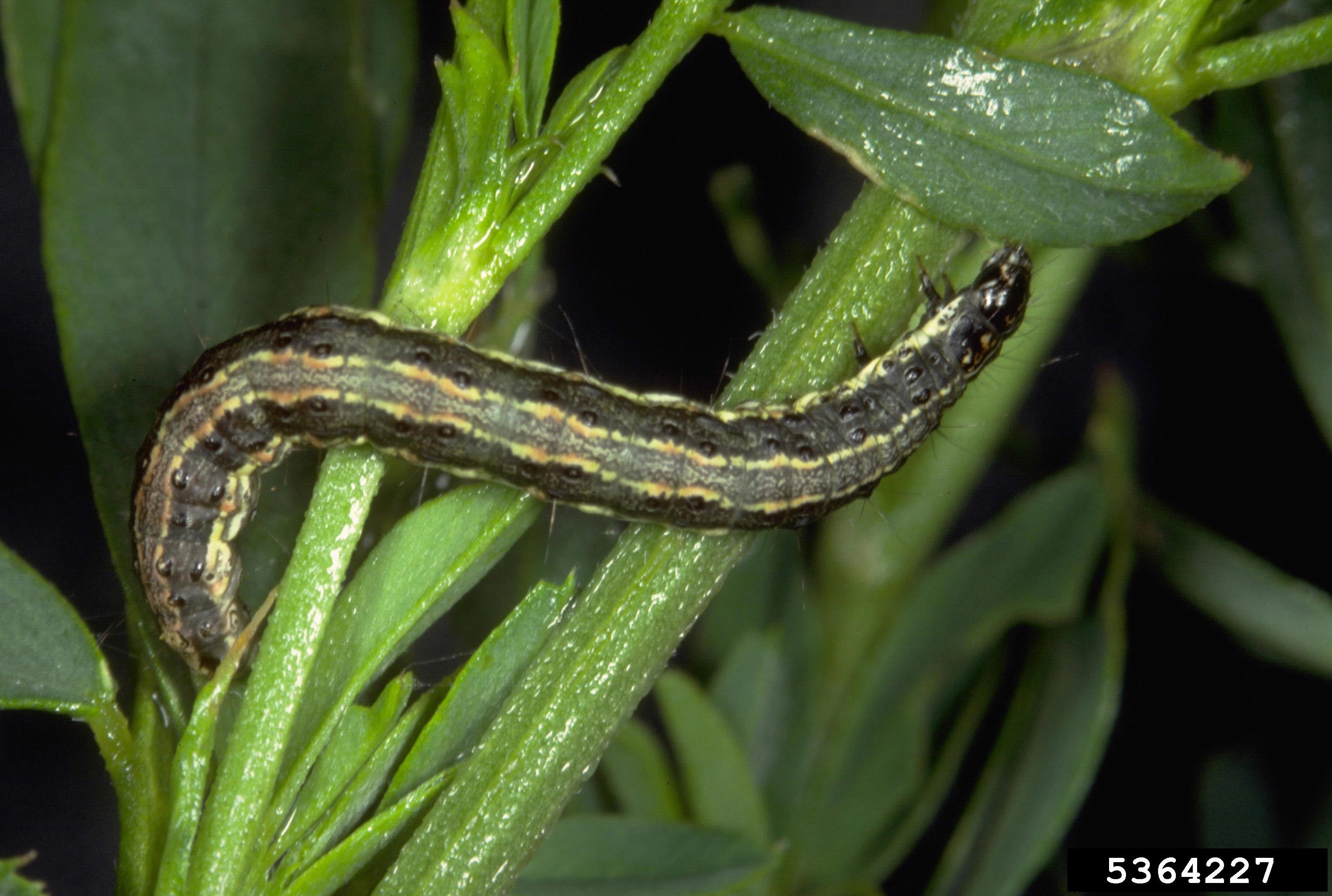
Larva

The wingspan is 30–34 mm. Adults are on wing from March to October (May to early September in Alberta). The larvae feed on alfalfa and a variety of other crops and weed species.
