= Loxostege graeseri =

Scientific classification
- Kingdom: Animalia
- Phylum: Arthropoda
- Clade: Pancrustacea
- Class: Insecta
- Order: Lepidoptera
- Family: Crambidae
- Genus: Loxostege
- Species: L. graeseri

Binomial name
- Loxostege graeseri (Staudinger, 1892)

Synonyms
- Botys graeseri Staudinger, 1892

Species of moth

Loxostege graeseri is a moth in the family Crambidae. It was described by Staudinger in 1892. It is found in the Russian Far East (Amur).
