= Loxostege anartalis =

Scientific classification
- Kingdom: Animalia
- Phylum: Arthropoda
- Clade: Pancrustacea
- Class: Insecta
- Order: Lepidoptera
- Family: Crambidae
- Genus: Loxostege
- Species: L. anartalis

Binomial name
- Loxostege anartalis (Grote, 1878)

Synonyms
- Eurycreon anartalis Grote, 1878; Botis lulualis Hulst, 1886

Species of moth

Loxostege anartalis is a moth in the family Crambidae. It was described by Augustus Radcliffe Grote in 1878. It is found in North America, where it has been recorded from coast to coast in Canada. In the west, the range extends south to California.

The wingspan is 20–24 mm. Adults have been recorded on wing from April to July.

== Subspecies ==
- Loxostege anartalis anartalis (California)
- Loxostege anartalis albertalis Barnes & McDunnough, 1918 (Manitoba west to the southern interior of British Columbia, north to the Northwest Territories and Alaska)
- Loxostege anartalis lulualis (Hulst, 1886) (California to Quebec)
- Loxostege anartalis rainierensis Munroe, 1976 (Washington)
- Loxostege anartalis saxicolalis Barnes & McDunnough, 1918 (Utah to Wyoming)
