= Loxostege terpnalis =

Scientific classification
- Kingdom: Animalia
- Phylum: Arthropoda
- Clade: Pancrustacea
- Class: Insecta
- Order: Lepidoptera
- Family: Crambidae
- Genus: Loxostege
- Species: L. terpnalis

Binomial name
- Loxostege terpnalis Barnes & McDunnough, 1918

Species of moth

Loxostege terpnalis is a moth in the family Crambidae. It was described by William Barnes and James Halliday McDunnough in 1918. It is found in North America, where it has been recorded from Nevada and California.

The wingspan is about 22 mm. The forewings are dark bluish gray. The hindwings are light brownish. Adults have been recorded on wing in May.
