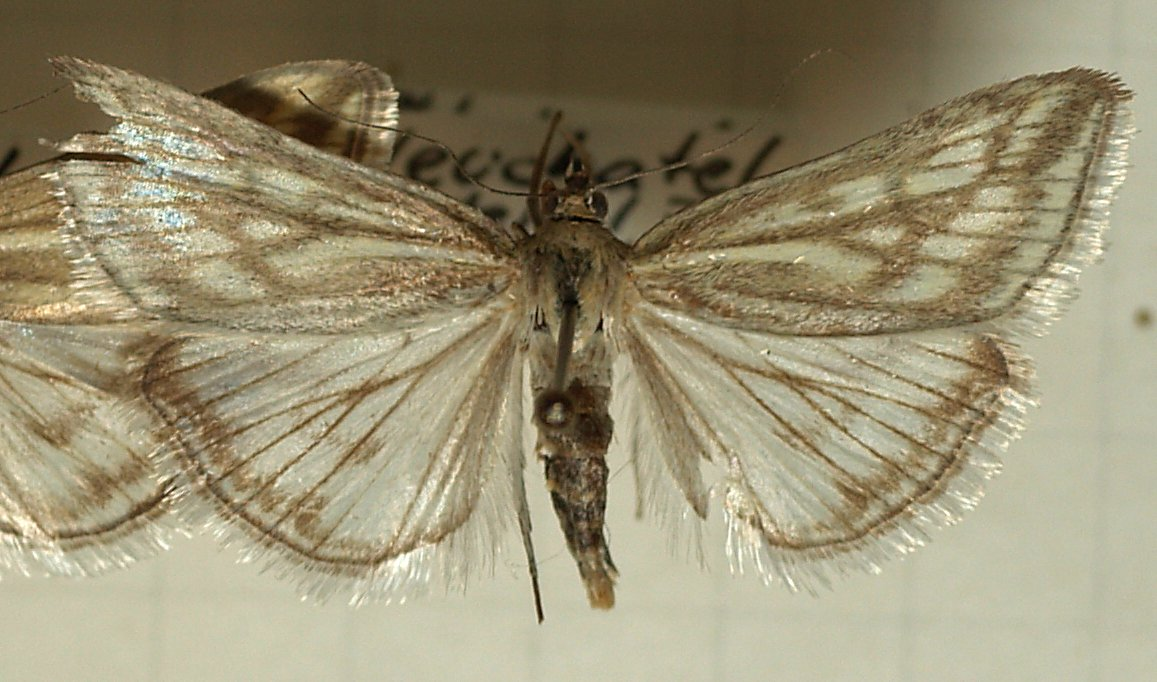

Scientific classification
- Kingdom: Animalia
- Phylum: Arthropoda
- Clade: Pancrustacea
- Class: Insecta
- Order: Lepidoptera
- Family: Crambidae
- Genus: Loxostege
- Species: L. virescalis

Binomial name
- Loxostege virescalis (Guenée, 1854)

Synonyms
- Spilodes virescalis Guenée, 1854

= Loxostege virescalis =

Species of moth

Loxostege virescalis is a species of moth of the family Crambidae described by Achille Guenée in 1854. It is found in parts of Europe, including France, Germany, Switzerland, Austria, Croatia, Bulgaria and Hungary.
