= Loxostege manualis =

Scientific classification
- Kingdom: Animalia
- Phylum: Arthropoda
- Clade: Pancrustacea
- Class: Insecta
- Order: Lepidoptera
- Family: Crambidae
- Genus: Loxostege
- Species: L. manualis

Binomial name
- Loxostege manualis (Geyer, 1832)

Synonyms
- Pyralis manualis Geyer, 1832; Pyrausta manualis furvalis Eversmann, 1842; Pyrausta furvalis Hampson, 1913

Species of moth

Loxostege manualis is a species of moth in the family Crambidae. It is found in Sweden, Germany, Austria, Switzerland, France, Spain, Italy, Hungary, Bosnia and Herzegovina, Romania, Bulgaria, the Republic of Macedonia, Albania, Greece and Russia.

The wingspan is 19–23 mm. Adults are on wing from May to June.

The larvae feed on Achillea millefolium.
