= Loxostege mojavealis =

Scientific classification
- Kingdom: Animalia
- Phylum: Arthropoda
- Clade: Pancrustacea
- Class: Insecta
- Order: Lepidoptera
- Family: Crambidae
- Genus: Loxostege
- Species: L. mojavealis

Binomial name
- Loxostege mojavealis Capps, 1967

Species of moth

Loxostege mojavealis is a moth in the family Crambidae. It was described by Hahn William Capps in 1967. It is found in North America, where it has been recorded from the Mojave Desert in Arizona and California.

The wingspan is about 22 mm. The ground color of the forewings is whitish, irrorated (sprinkled) with smoky fuscous and blackish markings. The hindwings are yellowish orange with fuscous postmedial and subterminal lines. Adults have been recorded on wing in June. Adults have been recorded on wing in April and July.
