= Loxostege deliblatica =

Scientific classification
- Kingdom: Animalia
- Phylum: Arthropoda
- Clade: Pancrustacea
- Class: Insecta
- Order: Lepidoptera
- Family: Crambidae
- Genus: Loxostege
- Species: L. deliblatica

Binomial name
- Loxostege deliblatica Szent-Ivány & Uhrik-Meszaros, 1942

Synonyms
- Phlyctaenodes (Loxostege) sulphuralis f. minor Caradja in Caradja & Meyrick, 1937; Pyralis gilvalis Hübner, 1796; Pyralis sulphuralis Hübner, 1813 (nec Thunberg, 1784); Phlyctaenodes sulphuralis ab. asignata Skala, 1928; Sitochroa huebneri Koçak, 1980

Species of moth

Loxostege deliblatica is a species of moth in the family Crambidae. It is found from Europe (Italy, Austria, the Czech Republic, Hungary, Croatia, Hungary, Romania, Bulgaria, the Republic of Macedonia, Greece and Russia), through Turkey and Central Asia (including Kyrgyzstan and Kazakhstan) to China.
