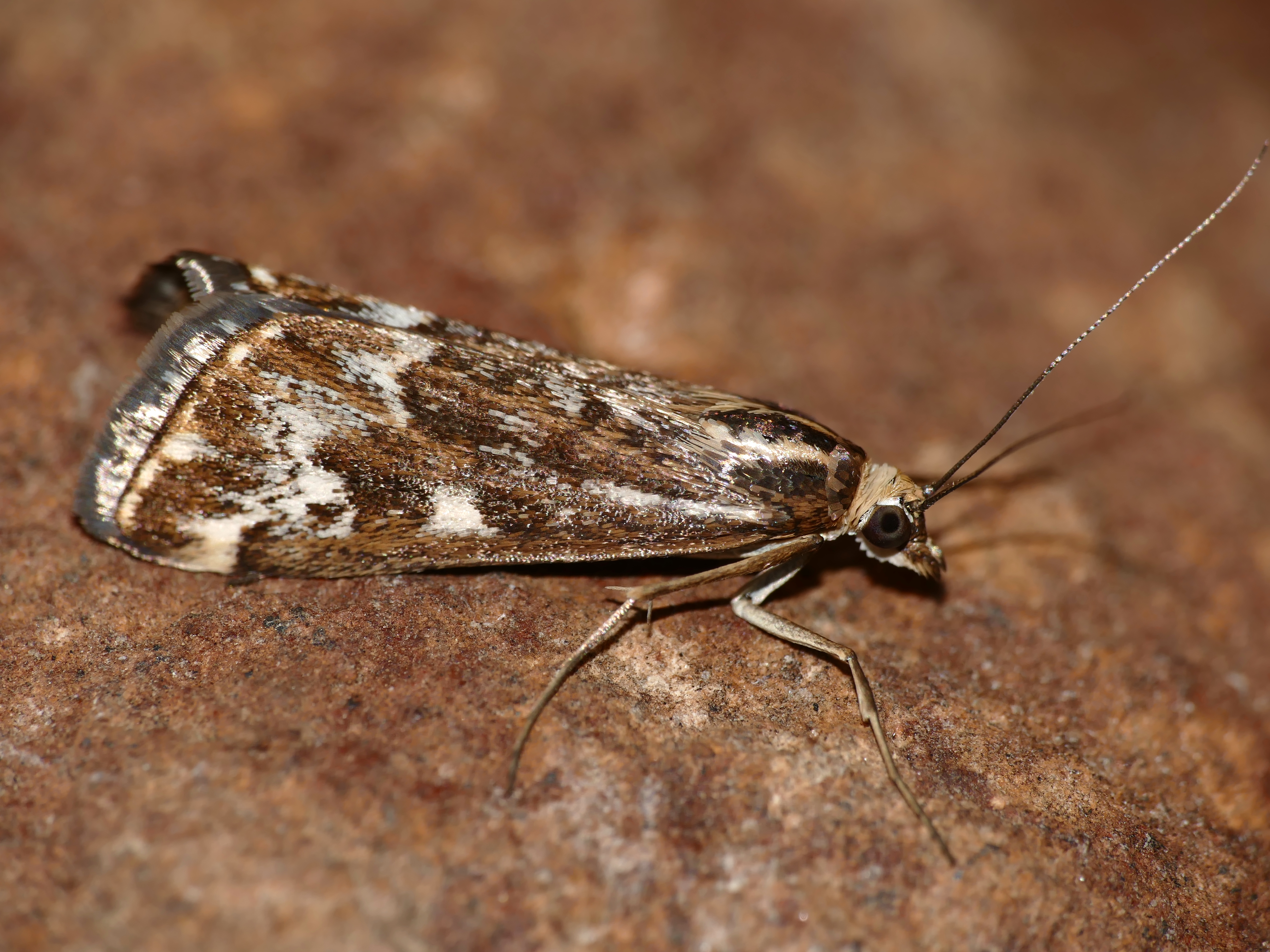

Scientific classification
- Kingdom: Animalia
- Phylum: Arthropoda
- Clade: Pancrustacea
- Class: Insecta
- Order: Lepidoptera
- Family: Crambidae
- Genus: Loxostege
- Species: L. frustalis

Binomial name
- Loxostege frustalis (Zeller, 1852)

Synonyms
- Botys frustalis Zeller, 1852; Eurycreon leucostictalis Zeller, 1872

= Loxostege frustalis =

Species of moth

Loxostege frustalis is a moth in the family Crambidae. It was described by Zeller in 1852. It is found in Botswana, Kenya, Lesotho, Namibia, South Africa (KwaZulu-Natal, the Eastern Cape and Gauteng) and Zimbabwe.
