= Semniomima ligatalis =

Scientific classification
- Domain: Eukaryota
- Kingdom: Animalia
- Phylum: Arthropoda
- Class: Insecta
- Order: Lepidoptera
- Family: Crambidae
- Genus: Semniomima
- Species: S. ligatalis

Binomial name
- Semniomima ligatalis (H. Druce, 1895)

Synonyms
- Episemnia ligatalis H. Druce, 1895

Species of moth

Semniomima ligatalis is a moth in the family Crambidae first described by Herbert Druce in 1895. It is found in Veracruz, Mexico.
