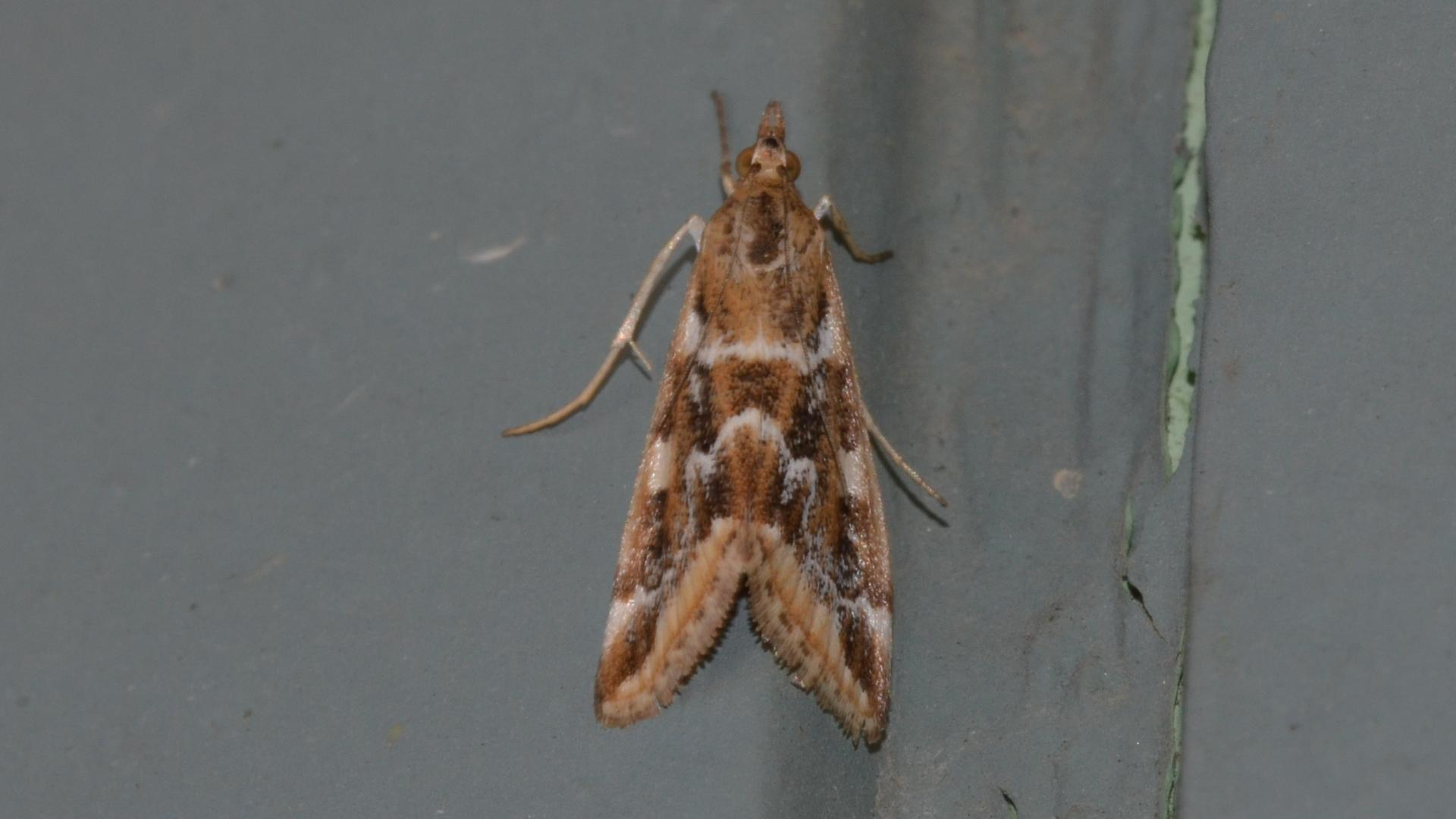

Scientific classification
- Kingdom: Animalia
- Phylum: Arthropoda
- Clade: Pancrustacea
- Class: Insecta
- Order: Lepidoptera
- Family: Crambidae
- Genus: Loxostege
- Species: L. lepidalis

Binomial name
- Loxostege lepidalis (Hulst, 1886)

Synonyms
- Prorasea lepidalis Hulst, 1886

= Loxostege lepidalis =

Species of moth

Loxostege lepidalis is a moth in the family Crambidae. It was described by George Duryea Hulst in 1886. It is found in North America, where it has been recorded from Alberta and eastern Washington to California and New Mexico.

Adults are on wing from June to August.
