= Loxostege triselena =

Scientific classification
- Kingdom: Animalia
- Phylum: Arthropoda
- Clade: Pancrustacea
- Class: Insecta
- Order: Lepidoptera
- Family: Crambidae
- Genus: Loxostege
- Species: L. triselena

Binomial name
- Loxostege triselena (Meyrick, 1937)

Synonyms
- Pyrausta triselena Meyrick, 1937

Species of moth

Loxostege triselena is a moth in the family Crambidae. It was described by Edward Meyrick in 1937. It is found in the Democratic Republic of the Congo.
