= Loxostege indentalis =

Scientific classification
- Kingdom: Animalia
- Phylum: Arthropoda
- Clade: Pancrustacea
- Class: Insecta
- Order: Lepidoptera
- Family: Crambidae
- Genus: Loxostege
- Species: L. indentalis

Binomial name
- Loxostege indentalis (Grote, 1883)

Synonyms
- Prorasea indentalis Grote, 1883

Species of moth

Loxostege indentalis is a moth in the family Crambidae. It was described by Augustus Radcliffe Grote in 1883. It is found in North America, where it has been recorded from California, Nevada, Utah, Oregon, Washington and Montana.

The moth is about 35 mm. Adults have been recorded on wing from April to September.
