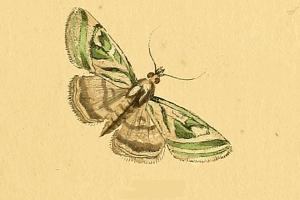

Scientific classification
- Kingdom: Animalia
- Phylum: Arthropoda
- Clade: Pancrustacea
- Class: Insecta
- Order: Lepidoptera
- Family: Crambidae
- Genus: Loxostege
- Species: L. aeruginalis

Binomial name
- Loxostege aeruginalis (Hubner, 1796)

Synonyms
- Pyralis aeruginalis Hubner, 1796; Pyralis olivalis Hübner, 1796

= Loxostege aeruginalis =

Species of moth

Loxostege aeruginalis is a species of moth in the family Crambidae. It is found in France, Spain, Italy, Croatia, Hungary, Romania, Bulgaria, the Republic of Macedonia, Albania, Greece, Ukraine, Russia and Turkey.

The wingspan is about 30 mm.
