= Loxostege mucosalis =

Scientific classification
- Kingdom: Animalia
- Phylum: Arthropoda
- Clade: Pancrustacea
- Class: Insecta
- Order: Lepidoptera
- Family: Crambidae
- Genus: Loxostege
- Species: L. mucosalis

Binomial name
- Loxostege mucosalis (Herrich-Schaffer, 1848)

Synonyms
- Botys mucosalis Herrich-Schaffer, 1848

Species of moth

Loxostege mucosalis is a species of moth in the family Crambidae. It is found in Bulgaria, North Macedonia, Ukraine, Turkey and Russia.
