= Loxostege aurantiacalis =

Scientific classification
- Kingdom: Animalia
- Phylum: Arthropoda
- Clade: Pancrustacea
- Class: Insecta
- Order: Lepidoptera
- Family: Crambidae
- Genus: Loxostege
- Species: L. aurantiacalis

Binomial name
- Loxostege aurantiacalis (Warren, 1889)

Synonyms
- Hyalea aurantiacalis Warren, 1889

Species of moth

Loxostege aurantiacalis is a moth in the family Crambidae. It was described by Warren in 1889. It is found in Brazil.
