= Semniomima fuscivenalis =

Scientific classification
- Domain: Eukaryota
- Kingdom: Animalia
- Phylum: Arthropoda
- Class: Insecta
- Order: Lepidoptera
- Family: Crambidae
- Genus: Semniomima
- Species: S. fuscivenalis

Binomial name
- Semniomima fuscivenalis (Schaus, 1920)

Synonyms
- Lygropia fuscivenalis Schaus, 1920; Loxostege fuscivenalis

Species of moth

Semniomima fuscivenalis is a moth in the family Crambidae. It was described by Schaus in 1920. It is found in Peru.

The wingspan is about 23 mm. The forewings are dull greyish brown, without any markings, except for brownish fuscous accentuation of the veins. The hindwings are brownish fuscous, with black accentuation of the veins.
