= Loxostege commixtalis =

Scientific classification
- Kingdom: Animalia
- Phylum: Arthropoda
- Clade: Pancrustacea
- Class: Insecta
- Order: Lepidoptera
- Family: Crambidae
- Genus: Loxostege
- Species: L. commixtalis

Binomial name
- Loxostege commixtalis (Walker, 1866)

Synonyms
- Scopula commixtalis Walker, 1866; Botys septentrionalis Tengström, 1869; Crambus indotatellus Walker, 1866

Species of moth

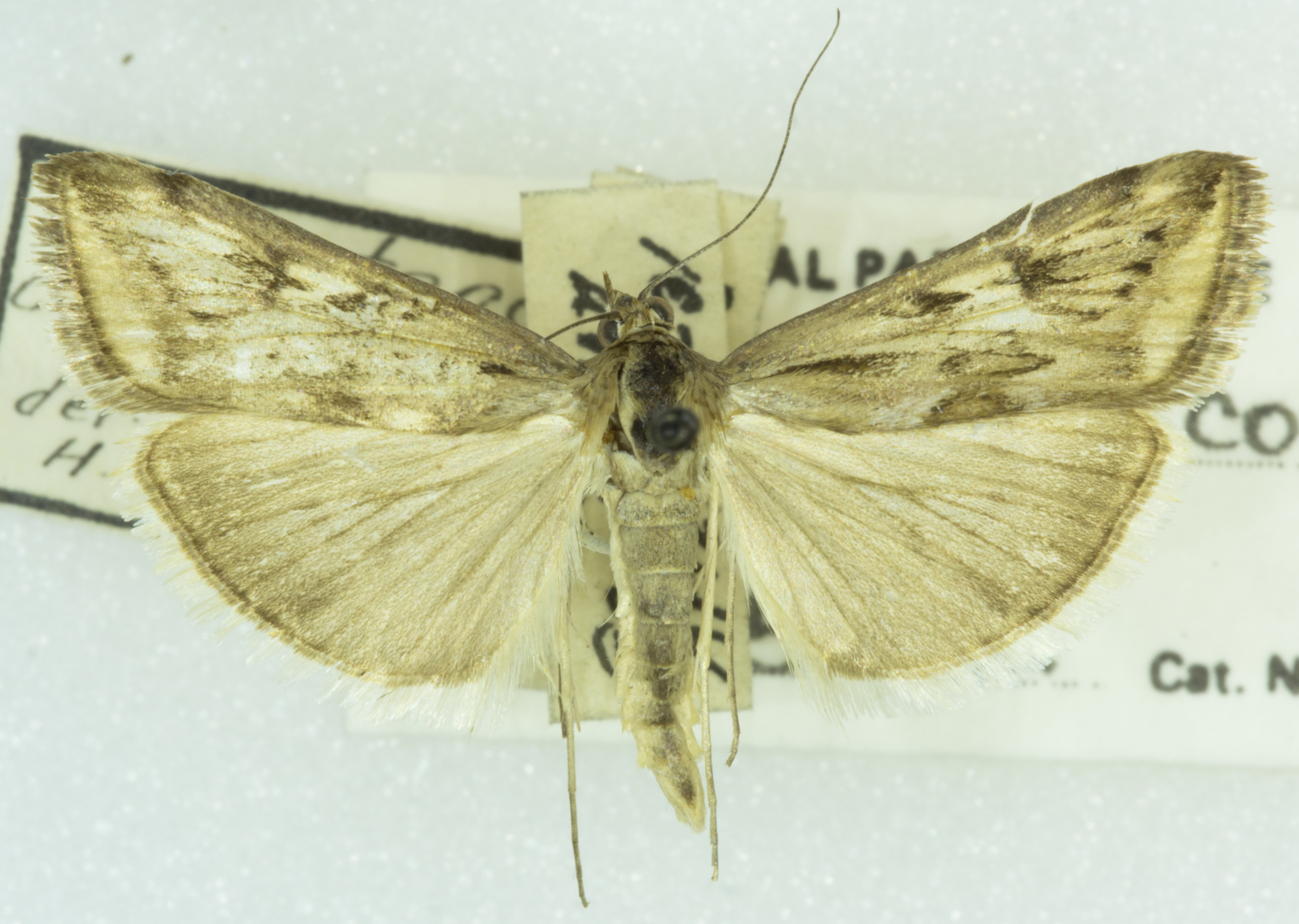
Loxostege commixtalis

Loxostege commixtalis, the alfalfa webworm, is a species of moth in the family Crambidae. It was described by Francis Walker in 1866. It is found in Fennoscandia, Estonia and northern Russia. It is also found in North America, where it ranges from Nova Scotia and Newfoundland and Labrador west to the Yukon.

The wingspan is 20–26 millimetres (0.79–1.02 in). Adults are on wing from June to July in North America and from May to July in Europe.

The larvae feed on various succulent plants, including sugar beet and alfalfa.
