= Loxostege leucalis =

Scientific classification
- Kingdom: Animalia
- Phylum: Arthropoda
- Clade: Pancrustacea
- Class: Insecta
- Order: Lepidoptera
- Family: Crambidae
- Genus: Loxostege
- Species: L. leucalis

Binomial name
- Loxostege leucalis (Hampson, 1900)

Synonyms
- Phlyctaenodes leucalis Hampson, 1900

Species of moth

Loxostege leucalis is a moth in the family Crambidae. It was described by George Hampson in 1900. It is found in the Caucasus.
