= Loxostege mira =

Scientific classification
- Kingdom: Animalia
- Phylum: Arthropoda
- Clade: Pancrustacea
- Class: Insecta
- Order: Lepidoptera
- Family: Crambidae
- Genus: Loxostege
- Species: L. mira

Binomial name
- Loxostege mira Amsel, 1951

Species of moth

Loxostege mira is a moth in the family Crambidae. It was described by Hans Georg Amsel in 1951 and is found in Iran.
