= Loxostege eversmanni =

Scientific classification
- Kingdom: Animalia
- Phylum: Arthropoda
- Clade: Pancrustacea
- Class: Insecta
- Order: Lepidoptera
- Family: Crambidae
- Genus: Loxostege
- Species: L. eversmanni

Binomial name
- Loxostege eversmanni (Staudinger, 1892)

Synonyms
- Eurycreon eversmanni Staudinger, 1892; Loxostege elutalis Zerny, 1914; Spilodes bicoloralis Warren, 1892

Species of moth

Loxostege eversmanni is a moth in the family Crambidae. It was described by Staudinger in 1892. It is found in Iraq, Central Asia and China.
