= Loxostege rhabdalis =

Scientific classification
- Kingdom: Animalia
- Phylum: Arthropoda
- Clade: Pancrustacea
- Class: Insecta
- Order: Lepidoptera
- Family: Crambidae
- Genus: Loxostege
- Species: L. rhabdalis

Binomial name
- Loxostege rhabdalis (Hampson, 1900)

Synonyms
- Phlyctaenodes rhabdalis Hampson, 1900

Species of moth

Loxostege rhabdalis is a moth in the family Crambidae. It was described by George Hampson in 1900. It is found in China and Mongolia.

== Subspecies ==
- Loxostege rhabdalis rhabdalis (China: Xinjiang)
- Loxostege rhabdalis rubrotinctalis Caradja, 1935 (Mongolia)
