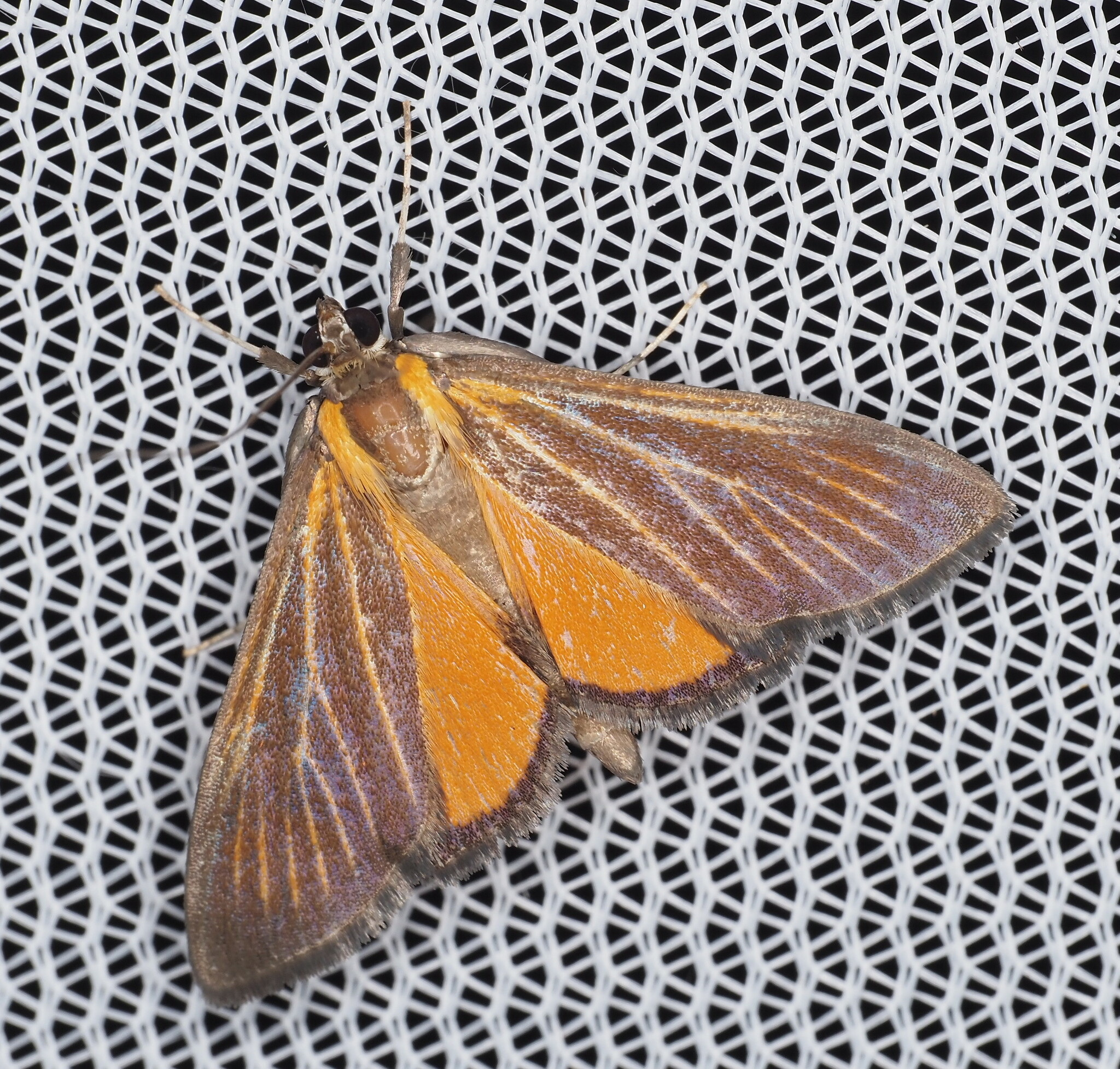

Scientific classification
- Kingdom: Animalia
- Phylum: Arthropoda
- Clade: Pancrustacea
- Class: Insecta
- Order: Lepidoptera
- Family: Crambidae
- Genus: Semniomima
- Species: S. clarissalis

Binomial name
- Semniomima clarissalis (Schaus, 1920)

Synonyms
- Nomophila clarissalis Schaus, 1920; Loxostege clarissalis

= Semniomima clarissalis =

Species of moth

Semniomima clarissalis is a species of moth in the family Crambidae. It was first described by Schaus in 1920 and is found in Peru.
