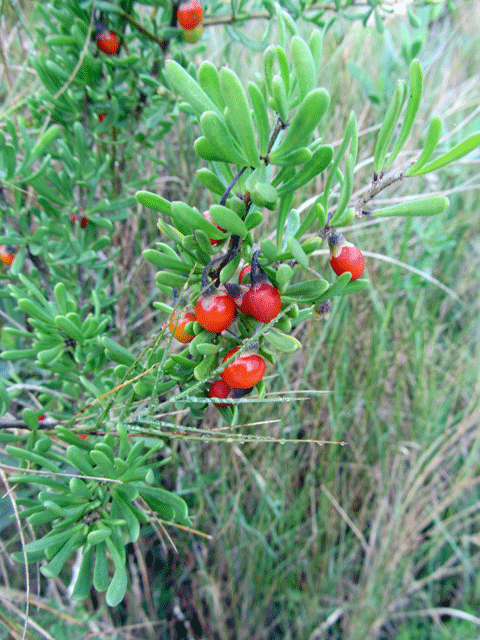

Scientific classification
- Kingdom: Plantae
- Clade: Tracheophytes
- Clade: Angiosperms
- Clade: Eudicots
- Clade: Asterids
- Order: Solanales
- Family: Solanaceae
- Genus: Lycium
- Species: L. carolinianum

Binomial name
- Lycium carolinianum Walter

= Lycium carolinianum =

Species of flowering plant

Lycium carolinianum, commonly known as Carolina desert-thorn or Christmas berry, is a species of flowering plant in the nightshade family, Solanaceae,

The plant produces small tomato-like fruits and is edible.
