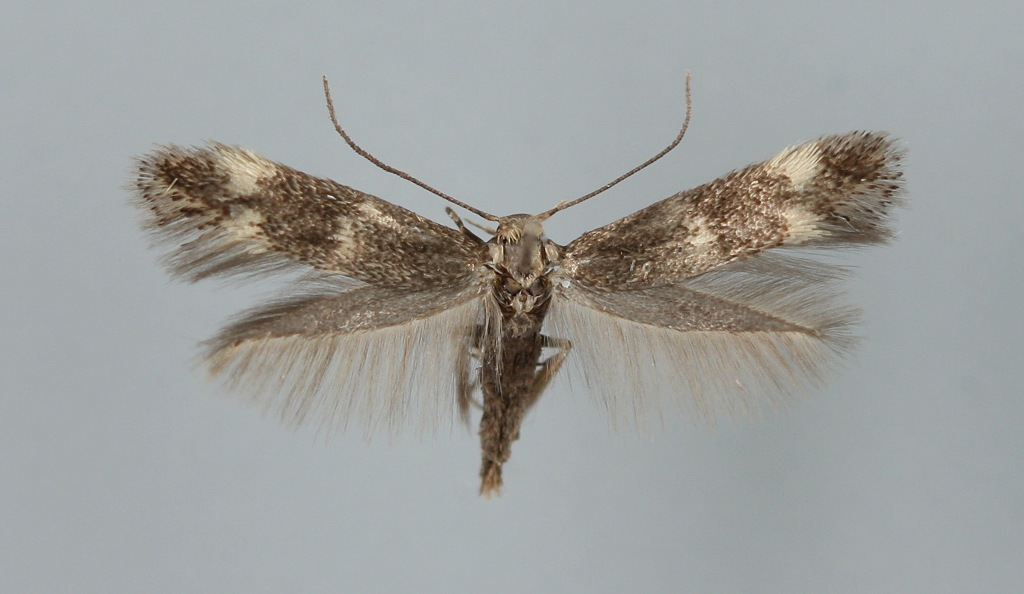

Scientific classification
- Domain: Eukaryota
- Kingdom: Animalia
- Phylum: Arthropoda
- Class: Insecta
- Order: Lepidoptera
- Family: Elachistidae
- Genus: Elachista
- Species: E. eskoi

Binomial name
- Elachista eskoi Kyrki & Karvonen, 1985

= Elachista eskoi =

Species of moth

Elachista eskoi is a moth of the family Elachistidae. It is found in Great Britain, Denmark, Fennoscandia and the Baltic region.

The wingspan is 11–14 millimetres (0.43–0.55 in) for males and 10–12.5 millimetres (0.39–0.49 in) for females. Adults are on wing in early morning and late evening.
