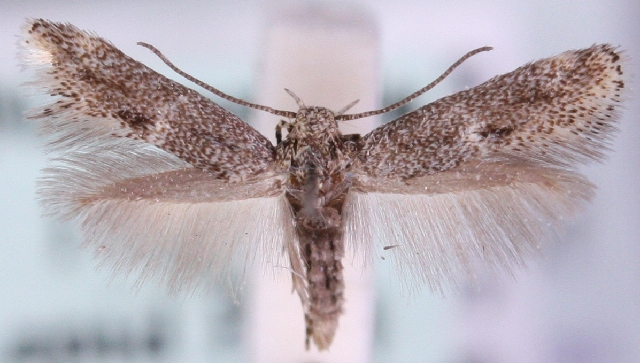

Scientific classification
- Domain: Eukaryota
- Kingdom: Animalia
- Phylum: Arthropoda
- Class: Insecta
- Order: Lepidoptera
- Family: Elachistidae
- Genus: Elachista
- Species: E. orstadii

Binomial name
- Elachista orstadii N. Palm, 1943

= Elachista orstadii =

Species of moth

Elachista orstadii is a moth of the family Elachistidae found in Europe.

== Description ==
The wingspan is 8–9 millimetres (0.31–0.35 in). Adults have been recorded in June.

== Distribution ==
It is found in Sweden, Great Britain, Denmark, the Netherlands, Germany, the Czech Republic, Slovakia, Austria, Switzerland and Italy.
