= Nemapogon falstriella =

Scientific classification
- Kingdom: Animalia
- Phylum: Arthropoda
- Clade: Pancrustacea
- Class: Insecta
- Order: Lepidoptera
- Family: Tineidae
- Genus: Nemapogon
- Species: N. falstriella

Binomial name
- Nemapogon falstriella (Bang-Haas, 1881)

Species of moth

Nemapogon falstriella is a species of moth belonging to the family Tineidae.

It is native to Europe.
