= Stigmella stettinensis =

Scientific classification
- Kingdom: Animalia
- Phylum: Arthropoda
- Clade: Pancrustacea
- Class: Insecta
- Order: Lepidoptera
- Family: Nepticulidae
- Genus: Stigmella
- Species: S. stettinensis

Binomial name
- Stigmella stettinensis (Heinemann, 1871)

Synonyms
- Nepticula stettinensis Heinemann, 1871

Species of moth

Stigmella stettinensis is a moth of the family Nepticulidae. It is found in Lithuania, Poland, the Czech Republic and Slovakia.

It was considered a synonym of Stigmella minusculella, but was raised to species status by A & Z Lastuvka in 2004.

There are three generations per year in central Europe.

The larvae feed on Pyrus communis. They mine the leaves of their host plant.
