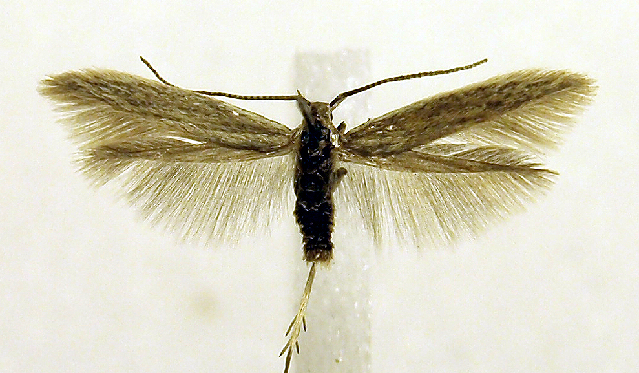

Scientific classification
- Kingdom: Animalia
- Phylum: Arthropoda
- Class: Insecta
- Order: Lepidoptera
- Family: Coleophoridae
- Genus: Coleophora
- Species: C. boreella

Binomial name
- Coleophora boreella Benander, 1939

= Coleophora boreella =

Species of moth

Coleophora boreella is a moth of the family Coleophoridae. It is found from Fennoscandia and northern Russia to the Netherlands and Poland.

The wingspan is 10–12 mm.

The larvae feed on Sagina nodosa. They create a trivalved tubular silken case of 4.4-5.8 mm with a mouth angle of 35-45°. The case has a few indistinct length lines and the surface is roughened by sand grains of varying size that are spun into it and fragments of the epidermis of mined leaves. The larvae mine the leaves, but also feed on the fruit. Full-grown larvae can be found in August and September.
