= Eucosma rubescana =

Scientific classification
- Kingdom: Animalia
- Phylum: Arthropoda
- Clade: Pancrustacea
- Class: Insecta
- Order: Lepidoptera
- Family: Tortricidae
- Genus: Eucosma
- Species: E. rubescana

Binomial name
- Eucosma rubescana (Constant, 1895)

Species of moth

Eucosma rubescana is a species of moth belonging to the family Tortricidae.

It is native to Western Europe.
