= Pammene herrichiana =

Scientific classification
- Kingdom: Animalia
- Phylum: Arthropoda
- Clade: Pancrustacea
- Class: Insecta
- Order: Lepidoptera
- Family: Tortricidae
- Genus: Pammene
- Species: P. herrichiana

Binomial name
- Pammene herrichiana (Heinemann, 1854)

Species of moth

Pammene herrichiana is a species of moth belonging to the family Tortricidae.

It is native to Europe.
