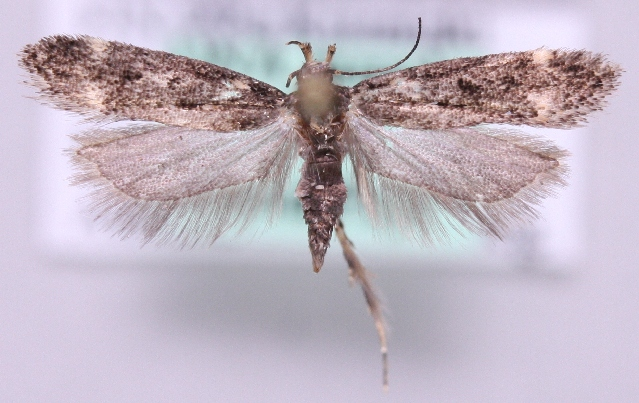

Scientific classification
- Kingdom: Animalia
- Phylum: Arthropoda
- Clade: Pancrustacea
- Class: Insecta
- Order: Lepidoptera
- Family: Gelechiidae
- Genus: Chionodes
- Species: C. ignorantella

Binomial name
- Chionodes ignorantella (Herrich-Schäffer, 1854)

Synonyms
- Gelechia ignorantella Herrich-Schäffer, 1854; Gelechia ochrisignella Nolcken, 1871

= Chionodes ignorantella =

Species of moth

Chionodes ignorantella is a moth of the family Gelechiidae. It is found in Denmark, Germany, the Czech Republic, Poland, Hungary, Estonia, Latvia, Norway, Sweden, Finland and Russia.

The wingspan is 14–16 mm. Adults have been recorded on wing from June to August.

The larvae feed on mosses. The species overwinters in the larval stage.
