= Coleophora parthenogenella =

Scientific classification
- Kingdom: Animalia
- Phylum: Arthropoda
- Class: Insecta
- Order: Lepidoptera
- Family: Coleophoridae
- Genus: Coleophora
- Species: C. parthenogenella

Binomial name
- Coleophora parthenogenella Falck, 2010

Species of moth

Coleophora parthenogenella is a moth of the family Coleophoridae. It is found in Denmark and Sweden.
