= Rhigognostis kovacsi =

Scientific classification
- Kingdom: Animalia
- Phylum: Arthropoda
- Clade: Pancrustacea
- Class: Insecta
- Order: Lepidoptera
- Family: Plutellidae
- Genus: Rhigognostis
- Species: R. kovacsi

Binomial name
- Rhigognostis kovacsi (Gozmany, 1952)

Species of moth

Rhigognostis kovacsi is a species of moth belonging to the family Plutellidae.

It is native to Scandinavia.
