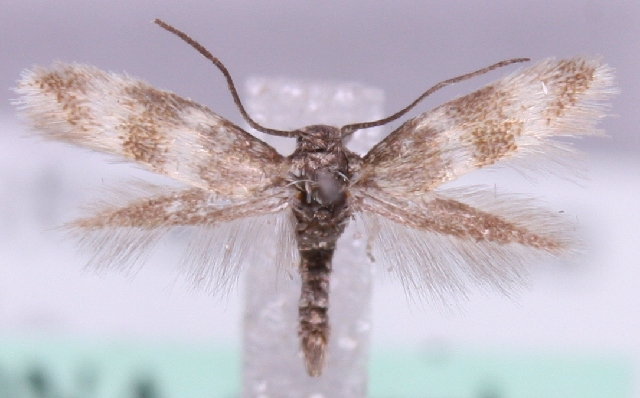

Scientific classification
- Domain: Eukaryota
- Kingdom: Animalia
- Phylum: Arthropoda
- Class: Insecta
- Order: Lepidoptera
- Family: Elachistidae
- Genus: Elachista
- Species: E. littoricola

Binomial name
- Elachista littoricola Le Marchand, 1938

= Elachista littoricola =

Species of moth

Elachista littoricola is a moth of the family Elachistidae. It is found in Great Britain, France, Germany, Denmark, the Czech Republic, Italy, Latvia, Estonia, Finland and Russia.

The wingspan is about 7–8 mm.

The larvae feed on couch grass (Elytrigia repens) mining the leaves of their host plant.
