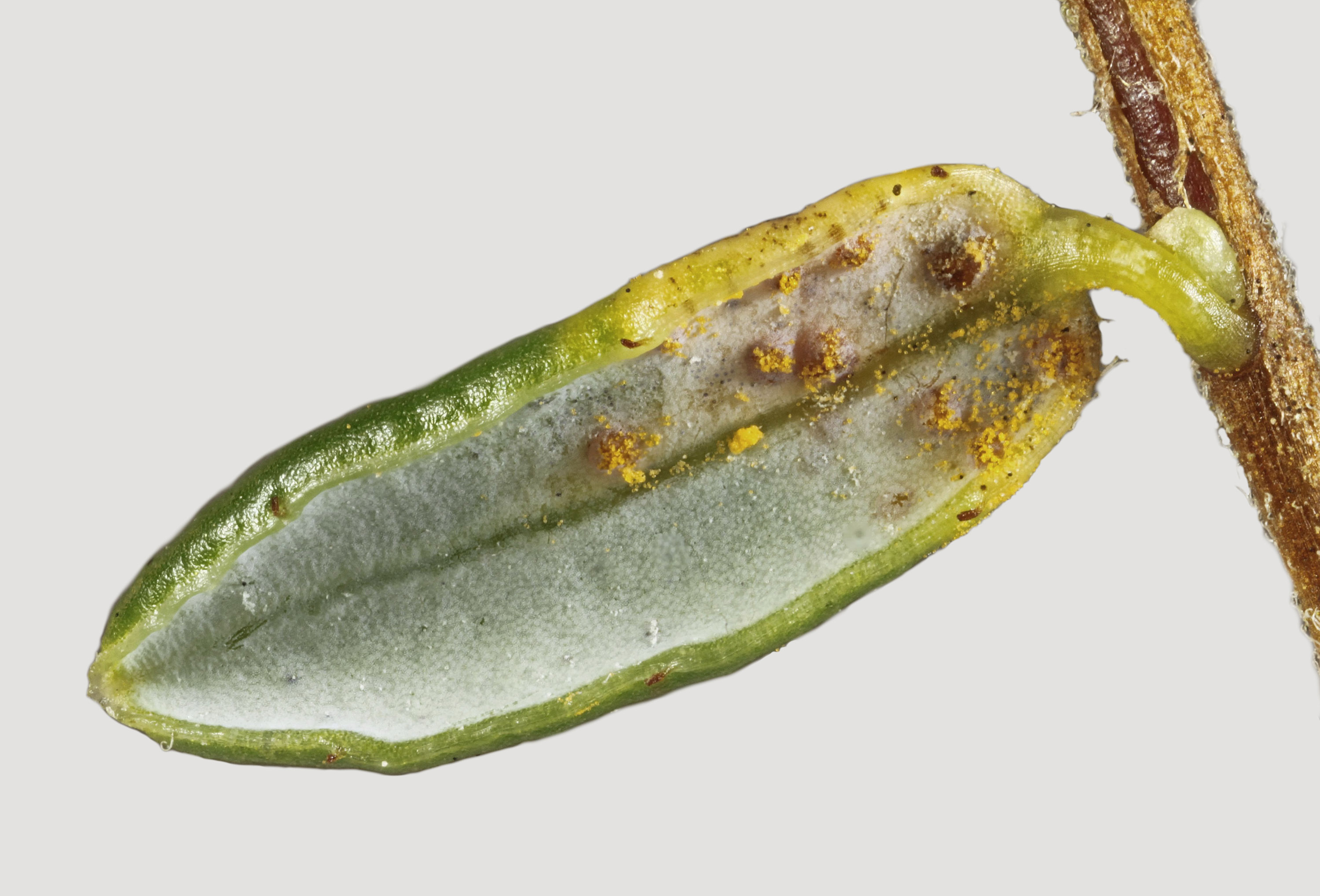
- N. vaccinii, formerly N. vacciniorum, on leaf of Vaccinium oxycoccos

Scientific classification
- Domain: Eukaryota
- Kingdom: Fungi
- Division: Basidiomycota
- Class: Pucciniomycetes
- Order: Pucciniales
- Family: Pucciniastraceae
- Genus: Naohidemyces
- Species: N. vaccinii

Binomial name
- Naohidemyces vaccinii (Alb. & Schwein.) S.Sato, Katsuya & Y.Hirats. (1993)

Synonyms
- Melampsora vaccinii (Alb. & Schwein.) G.Winter (1882); Pucciniastrum vaccinii (G. Winter) Jørst. (1952); Thekopsora vaccinii (Alb. & Schwein.) Hirats. f. (1955); Uredo pustulata var. vaccinii Alb. & Schwein., (1805); Uredo vaccinii (G.Winter) S.Sato et al.{?}

= Naohidemyces vaccinii =

Species of fungus

Naohidemyces vaccinii is a plant pathogen that affects members of the Vaccinium and Tsuga genera, causing leaf rust on lingonberries, blueberries, and cranberries, and early needle cast on hemlocks. Naohidemyces vaccinii is found on the Vaccinium genus in Canada, the United States (AK, ME, NH), the United Kingdom, Europe, Russia, China, Korea, and Japan, and on hemlock in AK, ID, WA in the United States, BC in Canada, and Japan.

== Taxonomy ==
Naohidemyces vaccinii is a basidiomycete rust fungi with a number of different synonyms, including Pucciniastrum vaccinii and Pucciniastrum myrtilli, but was moved to the Naohidemyces genus due to its dome-shaped covering over the aecia. N. vaccinii is now thought to be the western form of the fungi, and Thekopsora minima as the eastern form.

== Pathology ==
Naohidemyces vaccinii causes leaf rust on the leaves of the Vaccinium host, and chlorosis and early abscission on both Vaccinium and Tsuga, to which neither is fatal but can be a drain on fruit yield.

== Life cycle ==
Naohidemyces vaccinia is wind-borne, and initially forms yellow-orange urediniospores in pustulates on the underside of Vaccinium leaves in midsummer, which reinfect Vaccinium leaves, building up inoculum for reinfection. This is followed by flat telia crusts in late summer for overwintering, although rarely on lingonberries. Teliospores germinate from telia in spring, from which basidia form, releasing basidiospores to Tsuga species. Once alighting on Tsuga needles in the spring, pyncia are formed. Finally in early summer, yellow-orange aeciospores form in shallow conical aecia on the underside of the needles in two rows following the length of the needle.

== Disease impact ==
Leaf rust is most common on cultivated Vaccinium and relatively rare in wild populations. It is a relatively benign disease, and has little direct impact on crops, but has become an epidemic in rare occasions, particularly to cultivated blueberries.

== Controls ==
Fungicides have been shown to be effective against N. vaccinii, but not all are registered for blueberries, cranberries, or lingonberries. Applications depend on climate and species, as Vaccinium that keep their leaves throughout the year may need to be treated far earlier than the first sign of leafing out. Removing Tsuga or other wild, evergreen Vaccinium hosts within 0.5 km of crops can be beneficial in breaking the sporulation cycle.
