= G. A. W. Herrich-Schäffer =

German entomologist and physician (1799-1874)

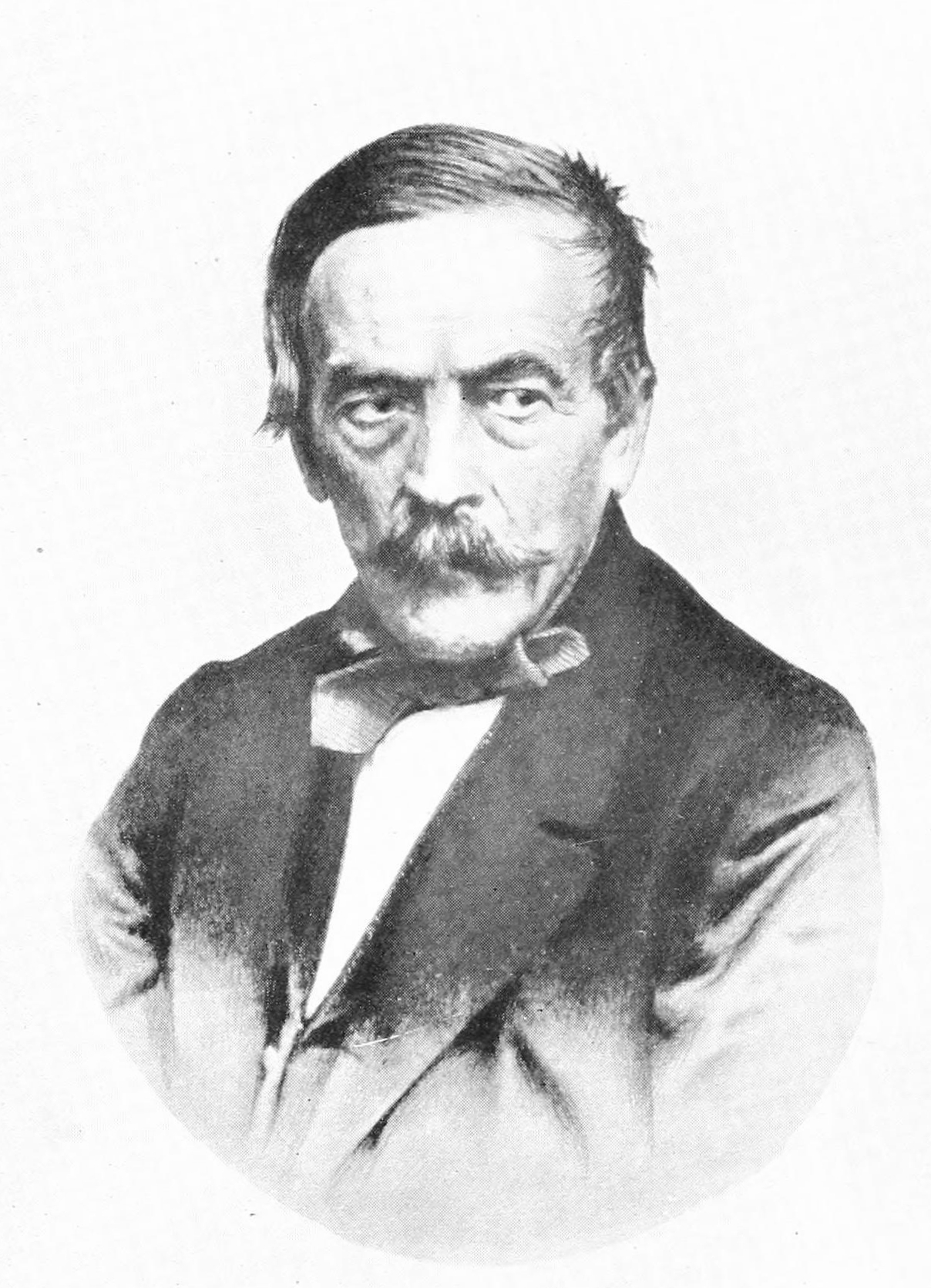
Gottlieb August Wilhelm Herrich-Schäffer

Gottlieb August Wilhelm Herrich-Schäffer (17 December 1799 – 14 April 1874) was a German entomologist and medical doctor.

He was born and died in Regensburg.

== Work ==
Herrich-Schäffer studied and collected butterflies and moths (Lepidoptera) in particular. He was chairman of the Regensburg Botanical Society (Regensburgischen Botanischen Gesellschaft) from 1861 to 1871, and was awarded an honorary citizenship of Regensburg in 1871.

He wrote Systematische Bearbeitung der Schmetterlinge von Europa between 1843 and 1856, one of the most influential works on the higher classification of Lepidoptera of the 19th century. Many of the lepidopteran higher taxa recognized today were defined in this work for the first time. He based his classification mostly on wing venation.

Parts of his collection went to Otto Staudinger at the Museum für Naturkunde in Berlin and M. J. Bastelberg at the Zoologische Staatssammlung München. Many Microlepidoptera in his collection were given to Ottmar Hofmann (1835–1900) at the Natural History Museum in London.

The author citation used for Herrich-Schäffer is Herr.-Schaeff. in botany or Herrich-Schäffer in zoology.

== Bibliography ==
- Die wanzenartigen Insekten. Getreu nach der Natur abgebildet und beschrieben. (Fortsetzung des Hahn'schen Werkes). (Volume 4, 1839 - Volume 9 & Alphabetisches synonymisches Verzeichniss, 1853) F? band. C.H. Zeh, Nbg. 108 pp. 1839.
- Die Wanzenartigen Insekten. Getreu nach der Natur abgebildet und beschrieben. Achter band. J.L. Lotzbeck, Nbg. 130 pp. 1848.
- Systematische Bearbeitung der Schmetterlinge von Europa, Zugleich als Text, Revision und Supplement zu Jacob Hubner's Sammlung europäischer Schmetterlinge. (6 Volumes, 1843-1856) Vierter Band. Zünsler u. Wickler. Manz, Regensburg. 288 + 48 pp. 1849 See under Jacob Hubner Commons for scans from this work.
- Die Schmetterlinge der Insel Cuba. Corr Bl Zool Min Ver Regensb 22: 147-156.1868.
- Nomenclator entomologicus. Verzeichniss der europäischen Insecten, zur Erleichterung des Tauschverkehrs mit Preisen versehen. Friedrich Pustet, Regensburg 1835-1840
- Index alphabetico-synonymicus insectorum hemiptera heteropterorum. Alphabetisch-synonymisches Verzeichniss der wanzenartigen Insecten. G. J. Manz, Regensburg 1853
- Sammlung neuer oder wenig bekannter aussereuropäischer Schmetterlinge. G. J. Manz, Regensburg 1850-1858
- Neue Schmetterlinge aus Europa und den angrenzenden Ländern. G. J. Manz, Regensburg 1860
- Neuer Schmetterlinge aus dem Museum Godeffroy in Hamburg. Erste Abtheilung: die Tagfalter. Stett. ent. Ztg. 30(1-3): 65-80, pls. 1-4 1869.
