= Pucciniastrum hydrangeae =

Scientific classification
- Kingdom: Fungi
- Division: Basidiomycota
- Class: Pucciniomycetes
- Order: Pucciniales
- Family: Pucciniastraceae
- Genus: Pucciniastrum
- Species: P. hydrangeae

Binomial name
- Pucciniastrum hydrangeae (Magnus) Arthur, (1906)

Species of fungus

Pucciniastrum hydrangeae is a species of plant pathogen and causal agent of Hydrangea rust. It primarily infects hydrangeas, especially Hydrangea arborescens, where it causes yellow, orange, or brown spotting on leaves. As the infection develops, small orange rust pustules form on the undersides of leaves and release large numbers of spores. Severe infections may lead to premature leaf drop and reduced ornamental quality.

The fungus is part of a group of specialized rust fungi that depend on living plant tissue to grow. Like many rust fungi, P. hydrangeae has a complex life cycle involving more than one host plant; hemlock trees can serve as an alternate host during part of its development. The disease is most common in warm, humid conditions that favor spore production and spread.
