= Vargtass =

Scandinavian alcoholic drink

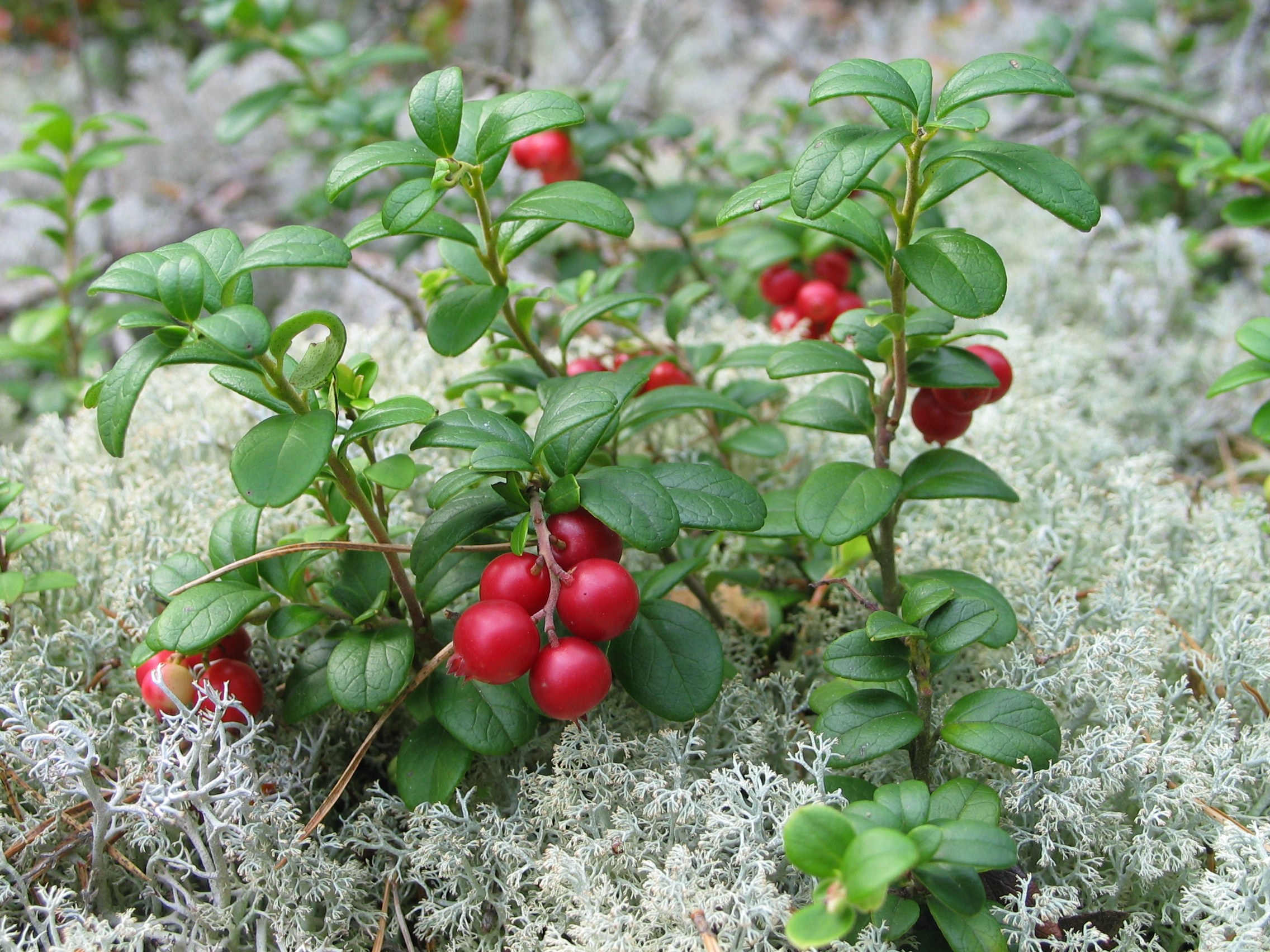
Lingonberries

Vargtass is an alcoholic cocktail originating from the northern parts of Sweden and Finland. It consists of vodka and lingonberry juice, typically shaken together with ice. Lingonberries or lingonberry jam are sometimes added. A Vargtass Royal is a vargtass with the addition of sparkling wine. Although lingonberries is the original choice, cranberries, sloe berries and aronia berries are possible alternatives.

The literal meaning of vargtass is "wolf's paw".

== Sources ==
- Solomon, Christopher (5 December 2008). "Skiing in the Land of the Midnight Sun". New York Times.
