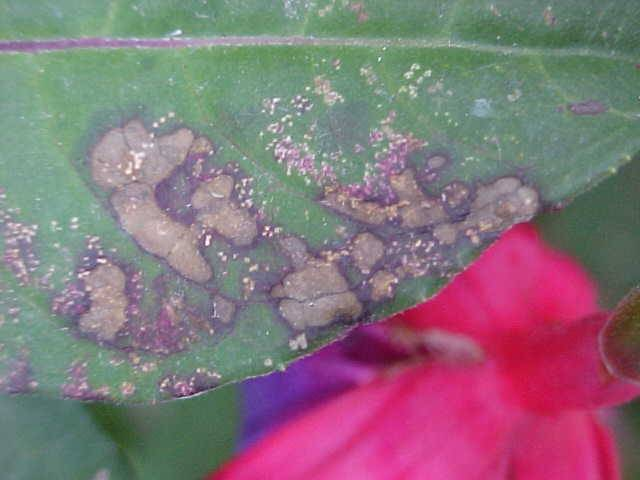
- Pucciniastrum epilobii on Fuchsia spp.

Scientific classification
- Kingdom: Fungi
- Division: Basidiomycota
- Class: Pucciniomycetes
- Order: Pucciniales
- Family: Pucciniastraceae
- Genus: Pucciniastrum
- Species: P. epilobii

Binomial name
- Pucciniastrum epilobii G.H. Otth, (1861)

Synonyms
- Melampsora epilobii Fuckel, (1870); Melampsora pustulata J. Schröt., (1887); Pucciniastrum abieti-chamaenerii Kleb., (1900); Pucciniastrum chamaenerii Rostr. Pucciniastrum fuchsiae Hirats., (1927); Pucciniastrum pustulatum Dietel, (1897); Uredo fuchsiae Arthur & Holw., (1918); Uredo pustulata Pers., (1801); Uredo pustulata a epilobii Pers., (1801)

= Pucciniastrum epilobii =

Species of fungus

Pucciniastrum epilobii is a plant pathogen infecting plants including fuchsias and spruces.
