= Scrobipalpa chrysanthemella =

Scientific classification
- Domain: Eukaryota
- Kingdom: Animalia
- Phylum: Arthropoda
- Class: Insecta
- Order: Lepidoptera
- Family: Gelechiidae
- Genus: Scrobipalpa
- Species: S. chrysanthemella

Binomial name
- Scrobipalpa chrysanthemella (Hofmann, 1867)

Synonyms
- Gelechia chrysanthemella Hofmann, 1867; Lita opificella Mann, 1878

Species of moth

Scrobipalpa chrysanthemella is a moth in the family Gelechiidae. It was described by Ernst Hofmann in 1867. It is found in Germany, Austria, Switzerland, Italy, the Czech Republic, Slovakia, Serbia, Bosnia and Herzegovina, Hungary, Romania, Russia and Turkey.

The forewings are blackish brown, with light grey and yellowish-grey scales. The hindwings are grey.

The larvae feed on Leucanthemum vulgare, Leucanthemum atratum, Tanacetum corymbosum and possibly Artemisia absinthum.
