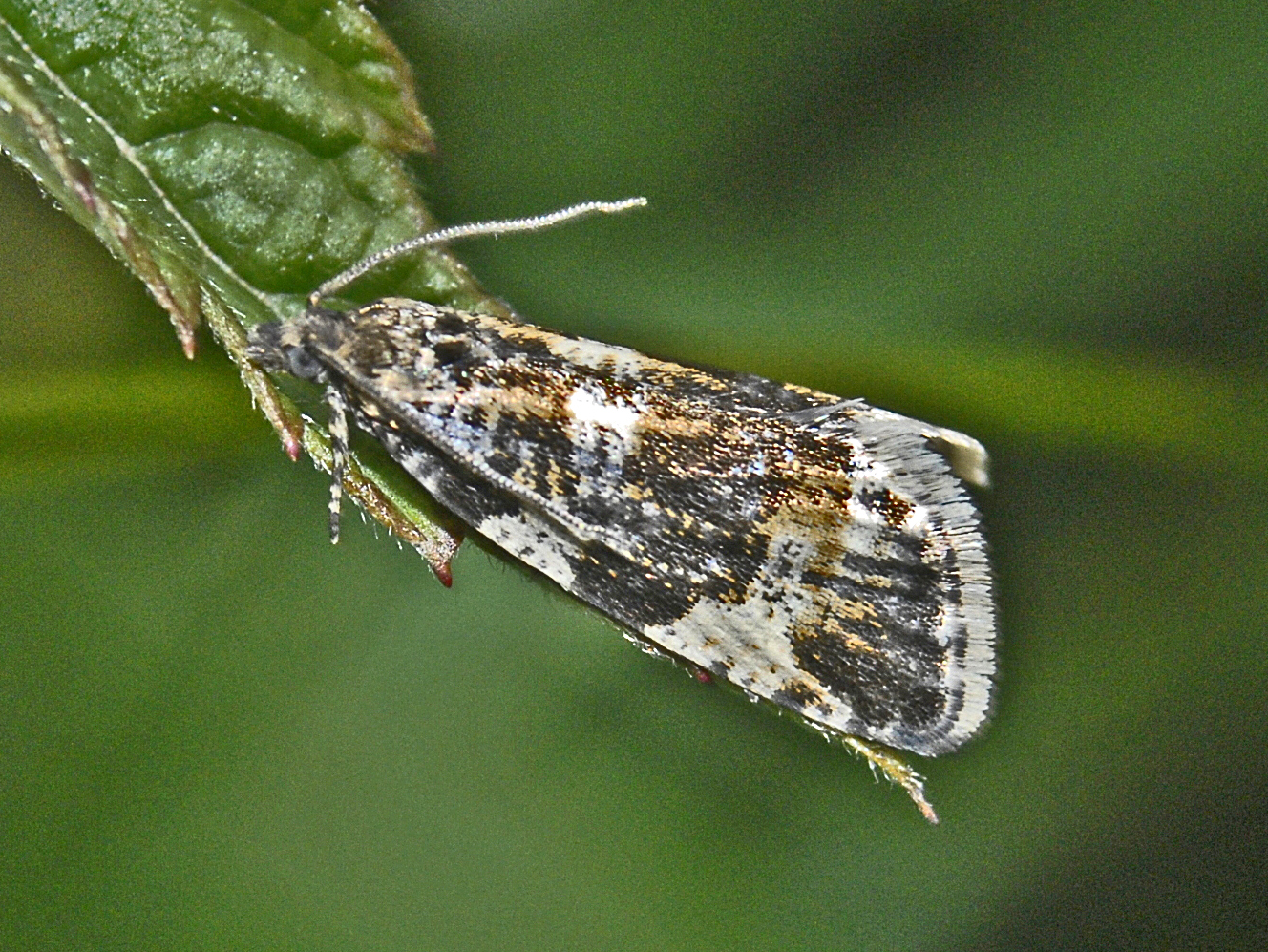

Scientific classification
- Domain: Eukaryota
- Kingdom: Animalia
- Phylum: Arthropoda
- Class: Insecta
- Order: Lepidoptera
- Family: Tortricidae
- Genus: Aterpia
- Species: A. corticana

Binomial name
- Aterpia corticana ([Denis & Schiffermuller], 1775)

Synonyms
- Tortrix corticana [Denis & Schiffermuller], 1775; Tortrix charpentierana Hubner, [1822-1823]; Aterpia charpenteriana; Penthina charpentieriana Frey, 1880; Tortrix interruptana Frolich, 1828

= Aterpia corticana =

Species of moth

Aterpia corticana is a species of moth of the family Tortricidae.

== Description ==
Aterpia corticana can reach a length of about 15–20 millimetres (0.59–0.79 in). Moths fly from July to August.

== Biology ==
Main host plants are Aconitum variegatum and Vaccinium vitis-idaea.

== Distribution ==
This species can be found in Austria, Bosnia and Herzegovina, Czech Republic, France, Germany, Hungary, Italy, Macedonia, Poland, Romania, Slovakia, Slovenia and Switzerland.

== Habitat ==
It occurs in mountain meadows and forest edges.

== Bibliography ==
- Lempke, B. J., 1979: Does Aterpia corticana Denis Schiffermuller occur in the Netherlands? Lep, Tortricidae. Entomologische Berichten (Amsterdam
