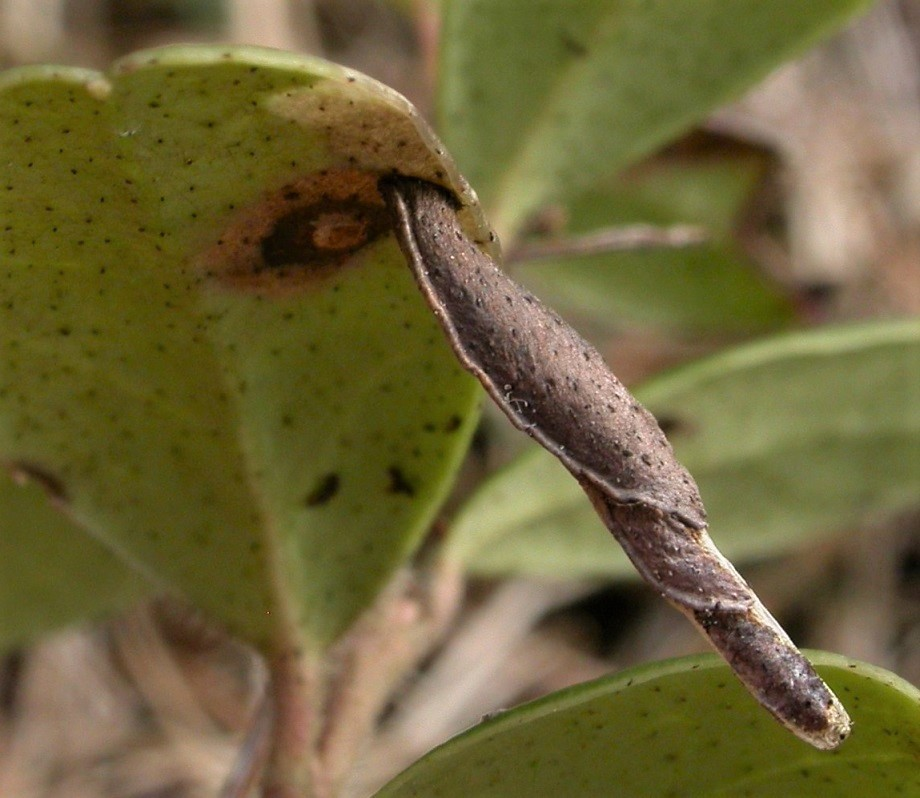
- Larval case

Scientific classification
- Kingdom: Animalia
- Phylum: Arthropoda
- Class: Insecta
- Order: Lepidoptera
- Family: Coleophoridae
- Genus: Coleophora
- Species: C. idaeella

Binomial name
- Coleophora idaeella Hofmann, 1869

= Coleophora idaeella =

Species of moth

Coleophora idaeella is a species of moth in the family Coleophoridae. It is found from Fennoscandia and northern Russia to the Pyrenees and the Alps and from Great Britain to Poland.

The wingspan is 13–15 mm for males and 11.5–13.5 mm for females.

The larvae feed on Vaccinium vitis-idaea. The larvae overwinter twice. Full-grown larvae can be found in May.
