= Coleophora pappiferella =

Scientific classification
- Kingdom: Animalia
- Phylum: Arthropoda
- Class: Insecta
- Order: Lepidoptera
- Family: Coleophoridae
- Genus: Coleophora
- Species: C. pappiferella

Binomial name
- Coleophora pappiferella Hofmann, 1869

Species of moth

Coleophora pappiferella is a moth of the family Coleophoridae found in Europe.

== Description ==
The wingspan is 11–14 mm. Coleophora pappiferella can only be reliably identified by dissection and microscopic examination of the genitalia.

== Distribution ==
It is found in Ireland, Scotland Fennoscandia, northern Russia, Estonia, Lithuania, Poland, Denmark, Germany, France, Switzerland, Austria, the Czech Republic, Slovakia, Romania and Italy.
