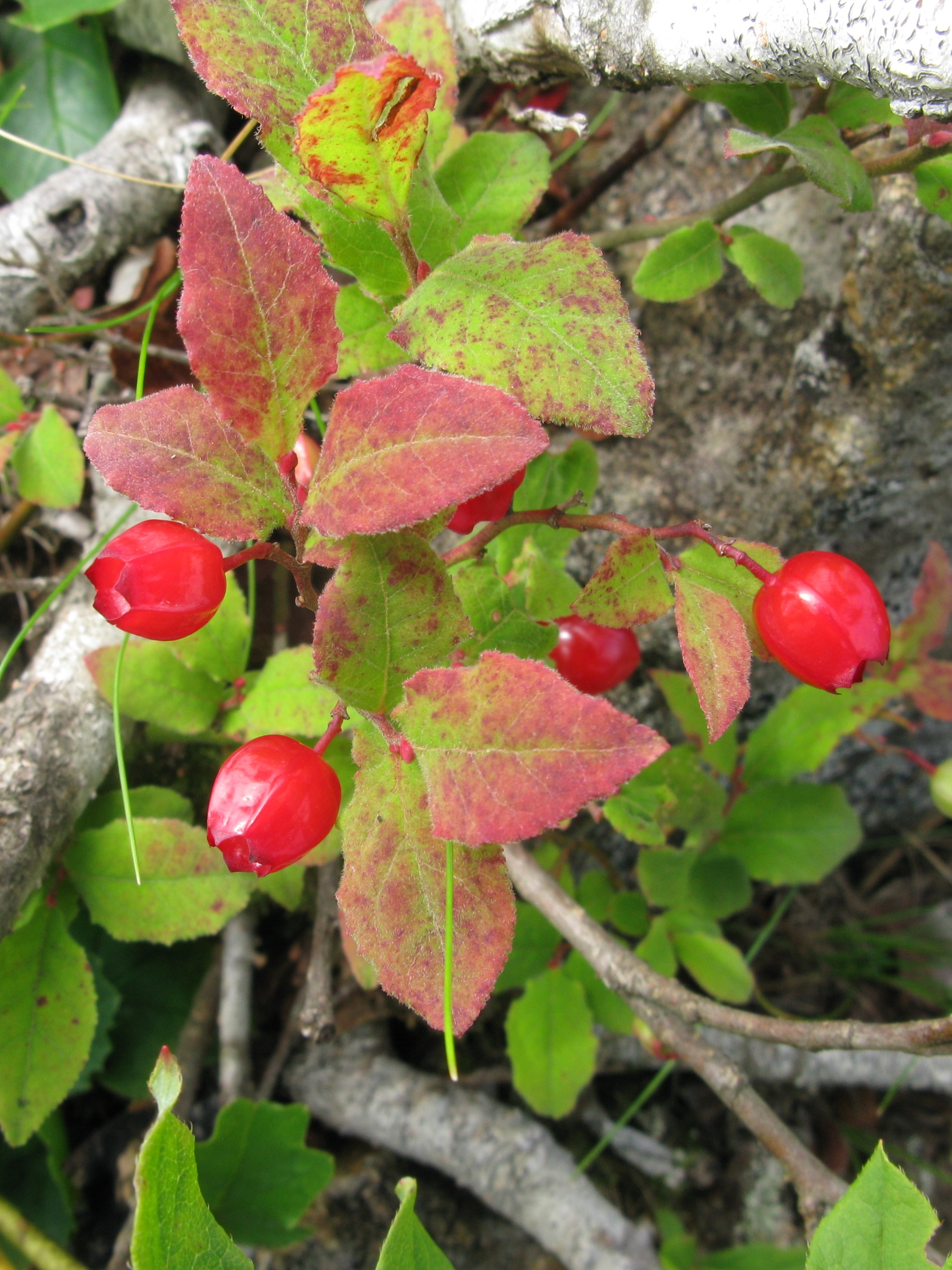

Scientific classification
- Kingdom: Plantae
- Clade: Tracheophytes
- Clade: Angiosperms
- Clade: Eudicots
- Clade: Asterids
- Order: Ericales
- Family: Ericaceae
- Genus: Vaccinium
- Species: V. hirtum

Binomial name
- Vaccinium hirtum Thunb.

Varieties
- Vaccinium hirtum var. hirtum; Vaccinium hirtum var. kiusianum (Koidz.) H.Hara; Vaccinium hirtum var. koreanum (Nakai) Kitam.; Vaccinium hirtum var. pubescens (Koidz.) T.Yamaz.

= Vaccinium hirtum =

Species of flowering plant

Vaccinium hirtum is a species of flowering plant in the family Ericaceae. It is a deciduous shrub native to east Asia. The species was described in 1784.

== Taxonomy ==
The species was described by Carl Peter Thunberg in 1784.

Four varieties are recognised:

- Vaccinium hirtum var. hirtum - native to Japan, the Kuril Islands, and Russia
- Vaccinium hirtum var. kiusianum (Koidz.) H.Hara - native to Japan
- Vaccinium hirtum var. koreanum (Nakai) Kitam. - native to China and Korea
- Vaccinium hirtum var. pubescens (Koidz.) T.Yamaz. - native to Japan

== Distribution ==
Vaccinium hirtum is native to the temperate biome of Japan, Russia (Khabarovsk and Sakhalin), Korea, the Kuril Islands, and Northeast China. The species grows in pine woods and thickets, and on mountains. It prefers moist, acidic soil.

== Description ==
Vaccinium hirtum is a deciduous shrub that grows up to 1 metre (3.3 ft) high. It is a hermaphrodite. The fruit is around 7 millimetres (0.28 in) wide.

== Ecology ==
Vaccinium hirtum is pollinated by insects. The plant is a host of Achrosis paupera, Caloptilia geminata, and Naohidemyces vaccinii.

== Uses ==
The fruit can be eaten raw or cooked.

== Nomenclature ==
In Chinese, Vaccinium hirtum is known as 红果越桔 (hóng guǒ yuè jié). In Japanese, it is known as ウスノキ (usunoki). In Korean, it is known as 산앵도나무 (san aeng do na mu). In Russian, the species is known as черника волосистая.
