= Milesina =

Milesina may refer to:

- Milesina (fungus), a genus of fungi in the family Pucciniastraceae
- Milesina (protist), a genus of foraminifers in the family Discorbinellidae
