= Pucciniastrum coryli =

Scientific classification
- Domain: Eukaryota
- Kingdom: Fungi
- Division: Basidiomycota
- Class: Pucciniomycetes
- Order: Pucciniales
- Family: Pucciniastraceae
- Genus: Pucciniastrum
- Species: P. coryli

Binomial name
- Pucciniastrum coryli Kom., (1899)

Species of fungus

Pucciniastrum coryli is a fungal plant pathogen infecting hazelnuts. It forms ochraceous rust pustules on the leaves. Also commonly known as hazel rust.

It is known to affect Corylus sieboldiana, Corylus colurna and Corylus heterophylla.
