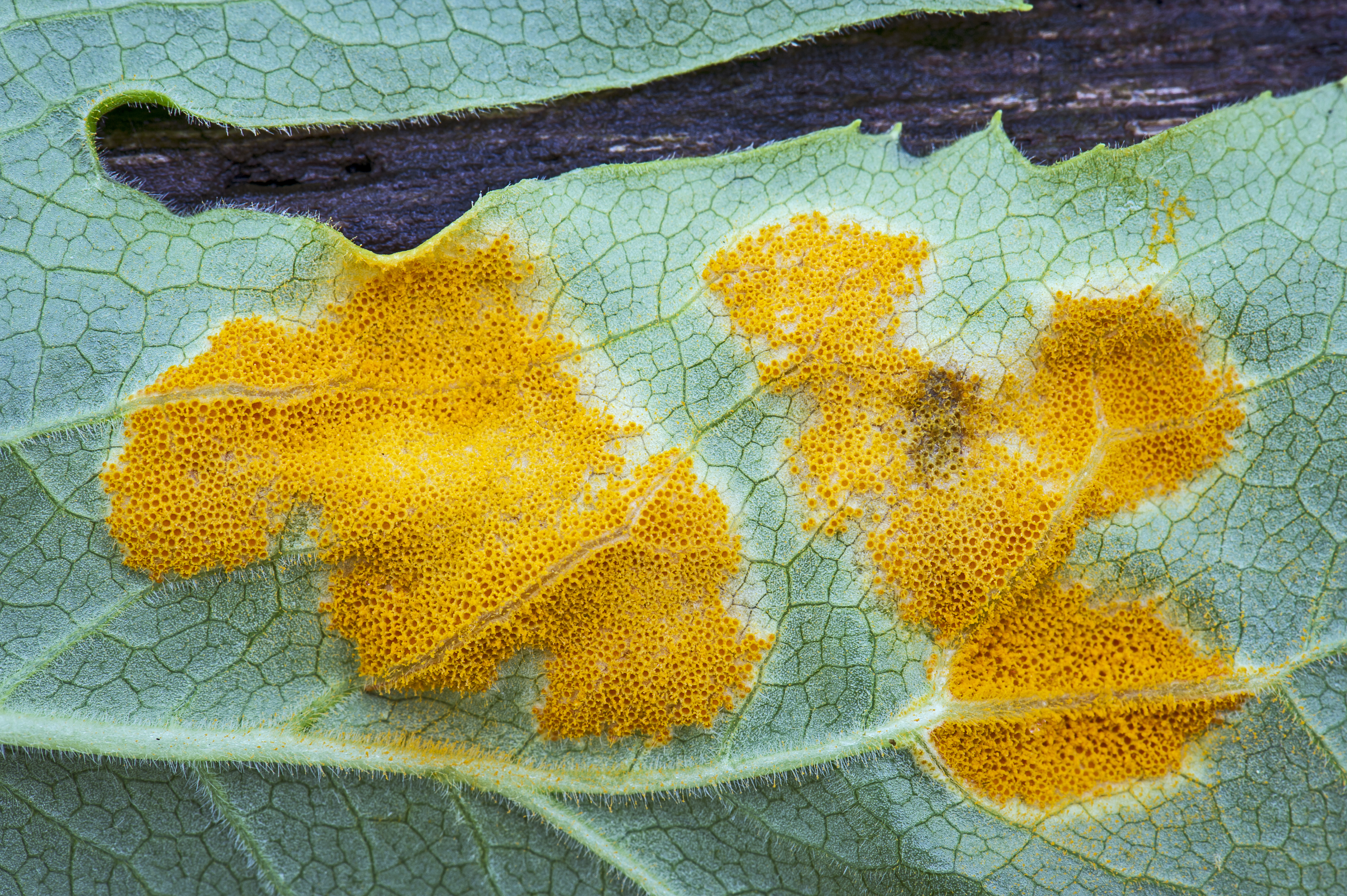

Scientific classification
- Domain: Eukaryota
- Kingdom: Fungi
- Division: Basidiomycota
- Class: Pucciniomycetes
- Order: Pucciniales
- Family: Pucciniastraceae
- Genus: Allodus
- Species: A. podophylli

Binomial name
- Allodus podophylli Schwein. (1822)

Synonyms
- Dicaeoma podophylli (Schwein.) Kuntze (1898); Puccinia podophylli Schwein. (1822); Aecidium podophylli Schwein. (1822); Puccinia podophylli (Schwein.) Link (1825); Puccinia aurea Spreng. (1827); Puccinia aculeata Link (1825); Caeoma podophyllatum Schwein. (1832)

= Allodus podophylli =

Species of fungus

Allodus podophylli, the mayapple rust, is a plant pathogen. This fungal parasite forms tiny bright orange cups on the underside of leaves of mayapple.

While the name Puccinia podophylli is often used, in 2012 the name Allodus podophylli was resurrected based on DNA evidence.
