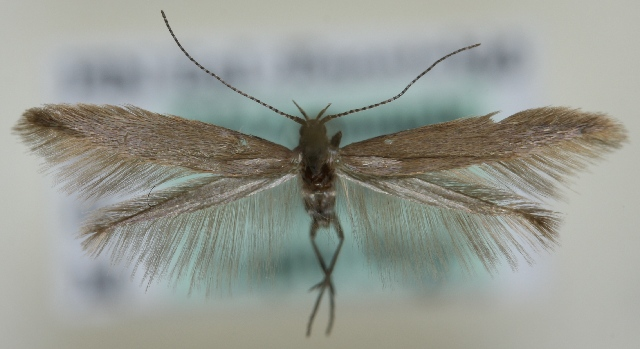

Scientific classification
- Kingdom: Animalia
- Phylum: Arthropoda
- Class: Insecta
- Order: Lepidoptera
- Family: Coleophoridae
- Genus: Coleophora
- Species: C. glitzella

Binomial name
- Coleophora glitzella Hofmann, 1869

= Coleophora glitzella =

Species of moth

Coleophora glitzella is a moth of the family Coleophoridae. It is found from Fennoscandia and northern Russia to Italy and from Great Britain to Romania. It was recently reported from Yukon, Canada.

== Description ==
The wingspan is 10–14 mm (0.39–0.55 in).

The larvae feed on Vaccinium vitis-idaea and Vaccinium uliginosum. Full-grown larvae can be found at the end of April.
