= Aterpia chalybeia =

Scientific classification
- Kingdom: Animalia
- Phylum: Arthropoda
- Class: Insecta
- Order: Lepidoptera
- Family: Tortricidae
- Genus: Aterpia
- Species: A. chalybeia

Binomial name
- Aterpia chalybeia Falkovich, 1966

Species of moth

Aterpia chalybeia is a moth belonging to the family Tortricidae. The species was first described by Mark I. Falkovitsh in 1966.

It is native to Northern Europe.
