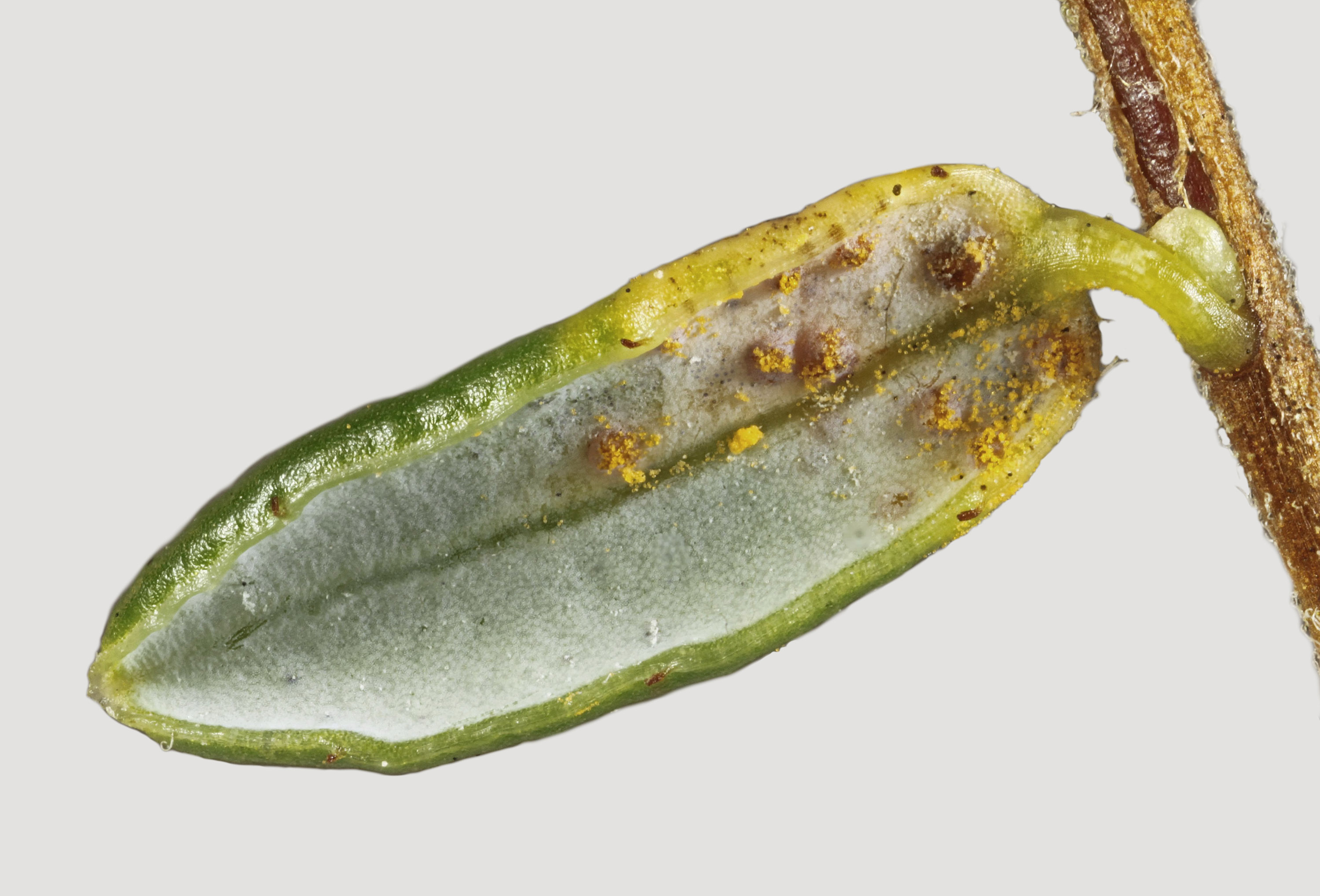
- Naohidemyces vaccinii, formerly Naohidemyces vacciniorum, on leaf of Vaccinium oxycoccos

Scientific classification
- Domain: Eukaryota
- Kingdom: Fungi
- Division: Basidiomycota
- Class: Pucciniomycetes
- Order: Pucciniales
- Family: Pucciniastraceae
- Genus: Naohidemyces; S.Sato, Katsuya & Y.Hirats.

= Naohidemyces =

Genus of fungi

Naohidemyces is a genus of fungi belonging to the family Pucciniastraceae.

The genus has almost cosmopolitan distribution.

Species:

- Naohidemyces fujisanensis S.Sato, Katsuya & Y.Hirats.
- Naohidemyces vaccinii (Jørst.) S.Sato, Katsuya & Y.Hirats. ex Vanderweyen & Fraiture
