= Aterpia sieversiana =

Scientific classification
- Kingdom: Animalia
- Phylum: Arthropoda
- Class: Insecta
- Order: Lepidoptera
- Family: Tortricidae
- Genus: Aterpia
- Species: A. sieversiana

Binomial name
- Aterpia sieversiana (Nolcken, 1870)

Species of moth

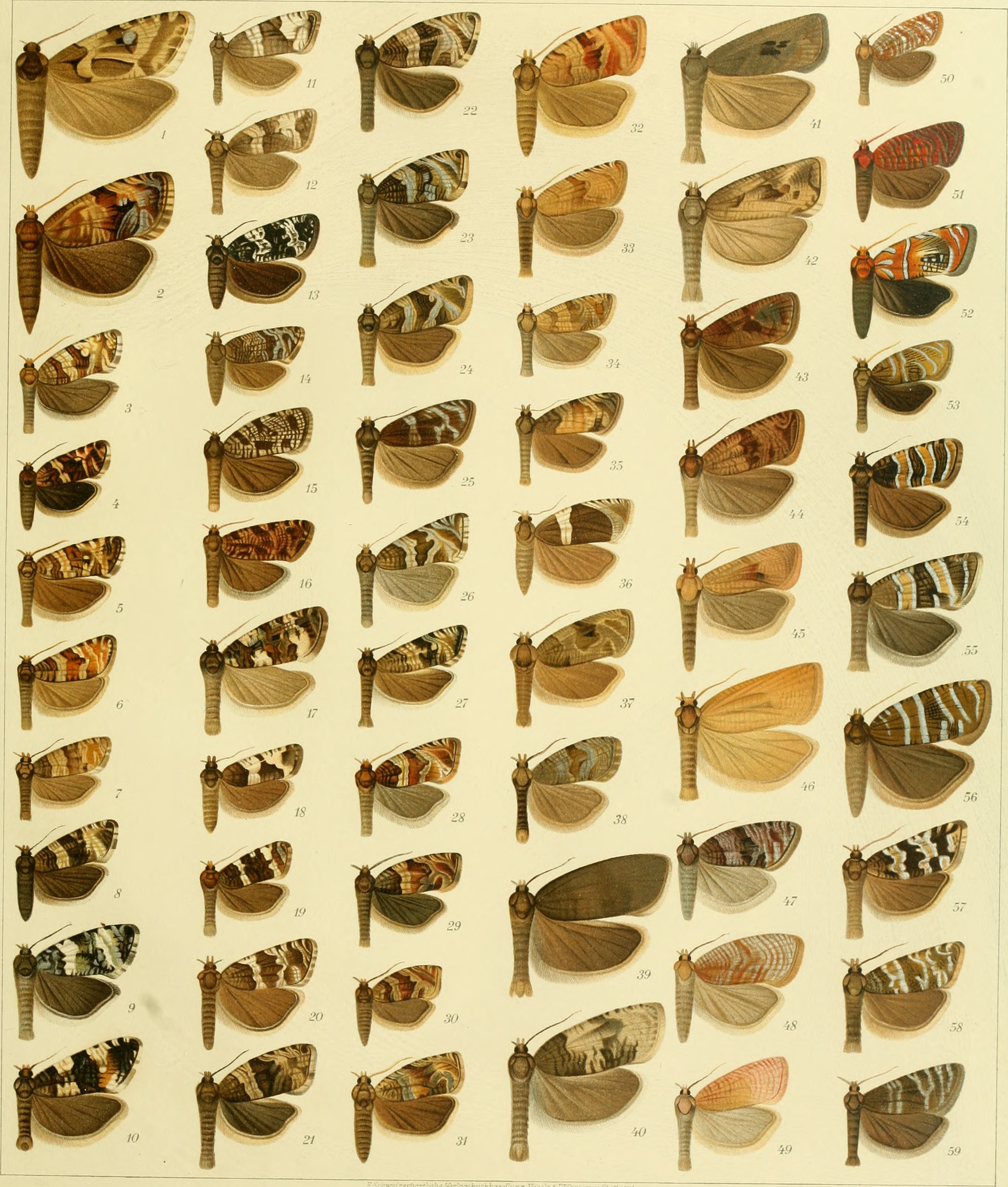

Aterpia sieversiana is a moth belonging to the family Tortricidae. The species was first described by J. H. Wilhelm von Nolcken in 1870.

It is native to Europe.
