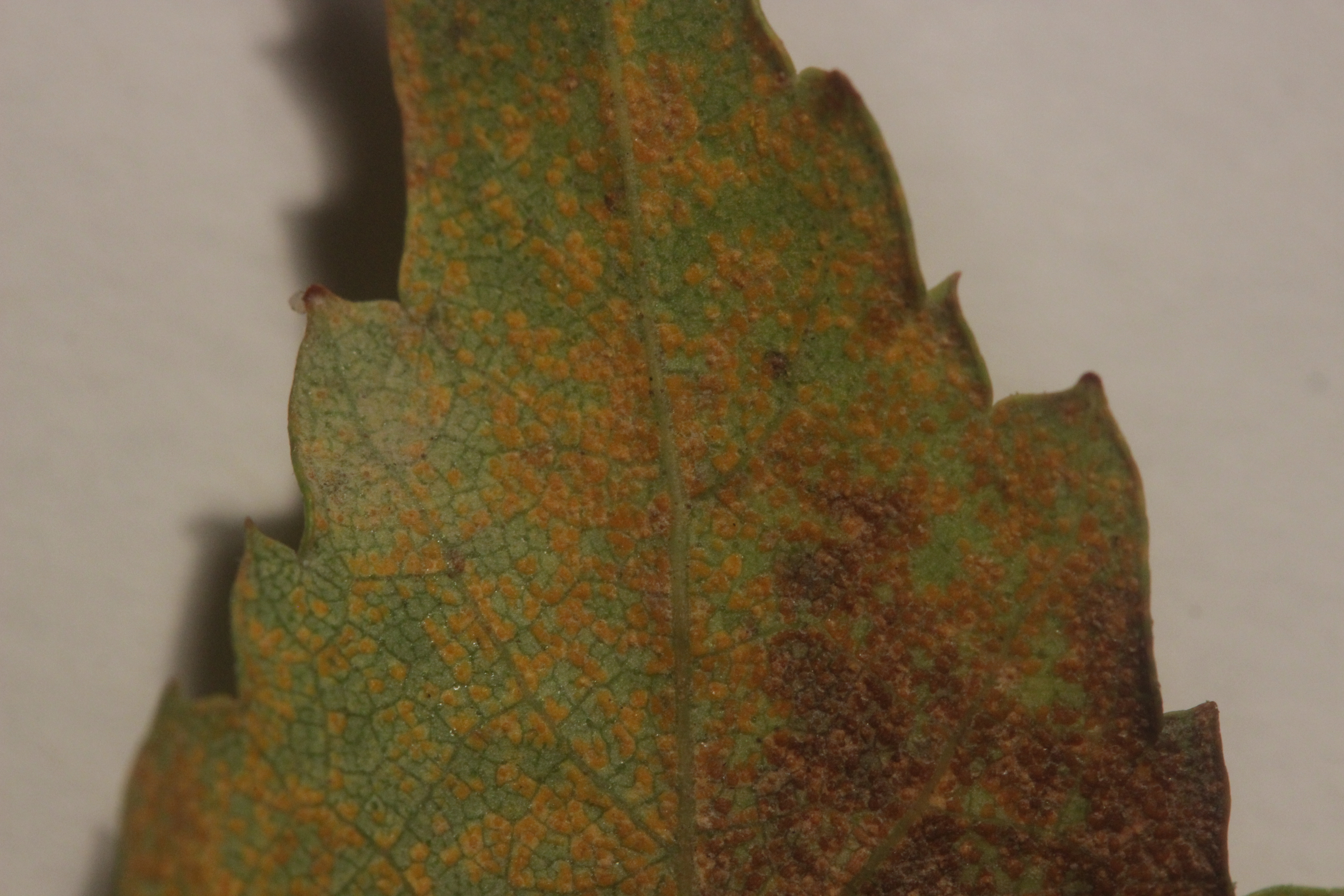
- Birch rust (Melampsoridium betulinum)

Scientific classification
- Kingdom: Fungi
- Division: Basidiomycota
- Class: Pucciniomycetes
- Order: Pucciniales
- Family: Pucciniastraceae
- Genus: Melampsoridium; Kleb.

= Melampsoridium =

Genus of fungi

Melampsoridium is a genus of fungi belonging to the family Pucciniastraceae.

The species of this genus are found in Eurasia, Northern America, and Australia.

== Species ==
Species:

- Melampsoridium alni (Thüm.) Dietel
- Melampsoridium alni-firmae Hirats.f.
- Melampsoridium alni-pendulae Hirats.f.
