= Caloptilia geminata =

Scientific classification
- Kingdom: Animalia
- Phylum: Arthropoda
- Class: Insecta
- Order: Lepidoptera
- Family: Gracillariidae
- Genus: Caloptilia
- Species: C. geminata

Binomial name
- Caloptilia geminata Kumata, 1966

Species of moth

Caloptilia geminata is a moth of the family Gracillariidae. It is known from Japan (Honshū).

The wingspan is 10–13.5 mm.

The larvae feed on Vaccinium hirtum and Vaccinium smallii. They probably mine the leaves of their host plant.
