= Lingonberry juice =

Juice made of lingonberries

- A glass of lingonberry juice
- Type: Fruit juice
- Origin: Sweden
- Color: Light pink to red
- Ingredients: Lingonberries
- Variants: Vargtass cocktail

Lingonberry juice is a type of juice made from lingonberries. Lingonberry juice does not need preservatives, due to the relatively high amount of benzoic acid present in the berries. Vargtass is a cocktail made of vodka and lingonberry juice.

== Health benefits ==
Drinking lingonberry juice can reduce risk of urinary tract infection, according to a study made by the University Hospital in Oulu, Finland. Fermented lingonberry juice can also support oral hygiene. Its high percentage of polyphenol can support cardiovascular health.

== History ==
Lingonberry juice has its deepest roots in the boreal forests of Northern Europe, particularly in Scandinavia/Sweden and Russia. In Sweden and Russia, the earliest form of lingonberry juice was simply "watered lingonberries" (vattlingon). People would harvest lingonberries in autumn, then place them whole into glass bottles or wooden barrels filled with water. The berries would keep the water fresh, creating a tart, refreshing infusion that was used throughout the winter to prevent scurvy.

== Gallery ==
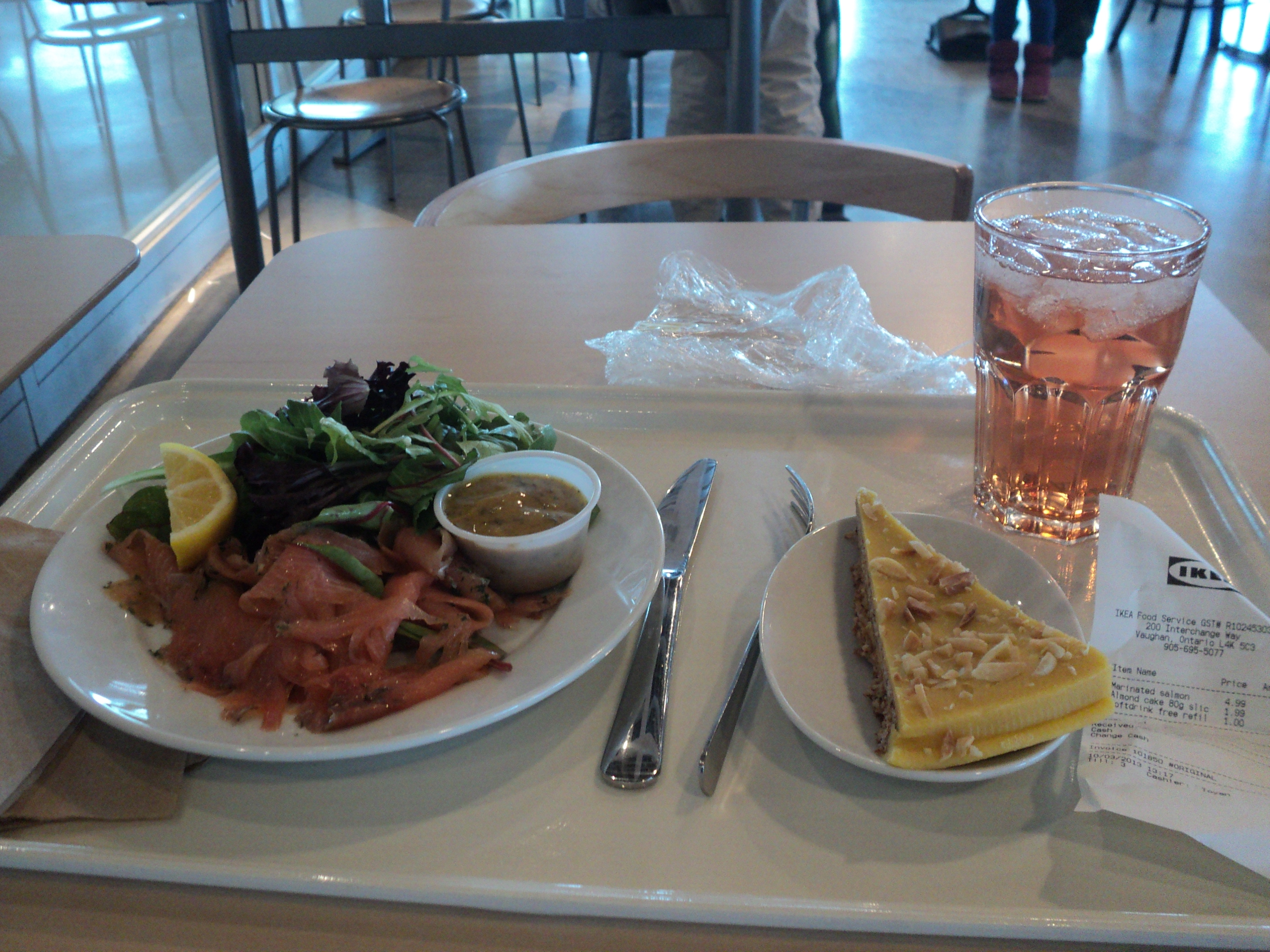
Lingonberry juice served at an IKEA

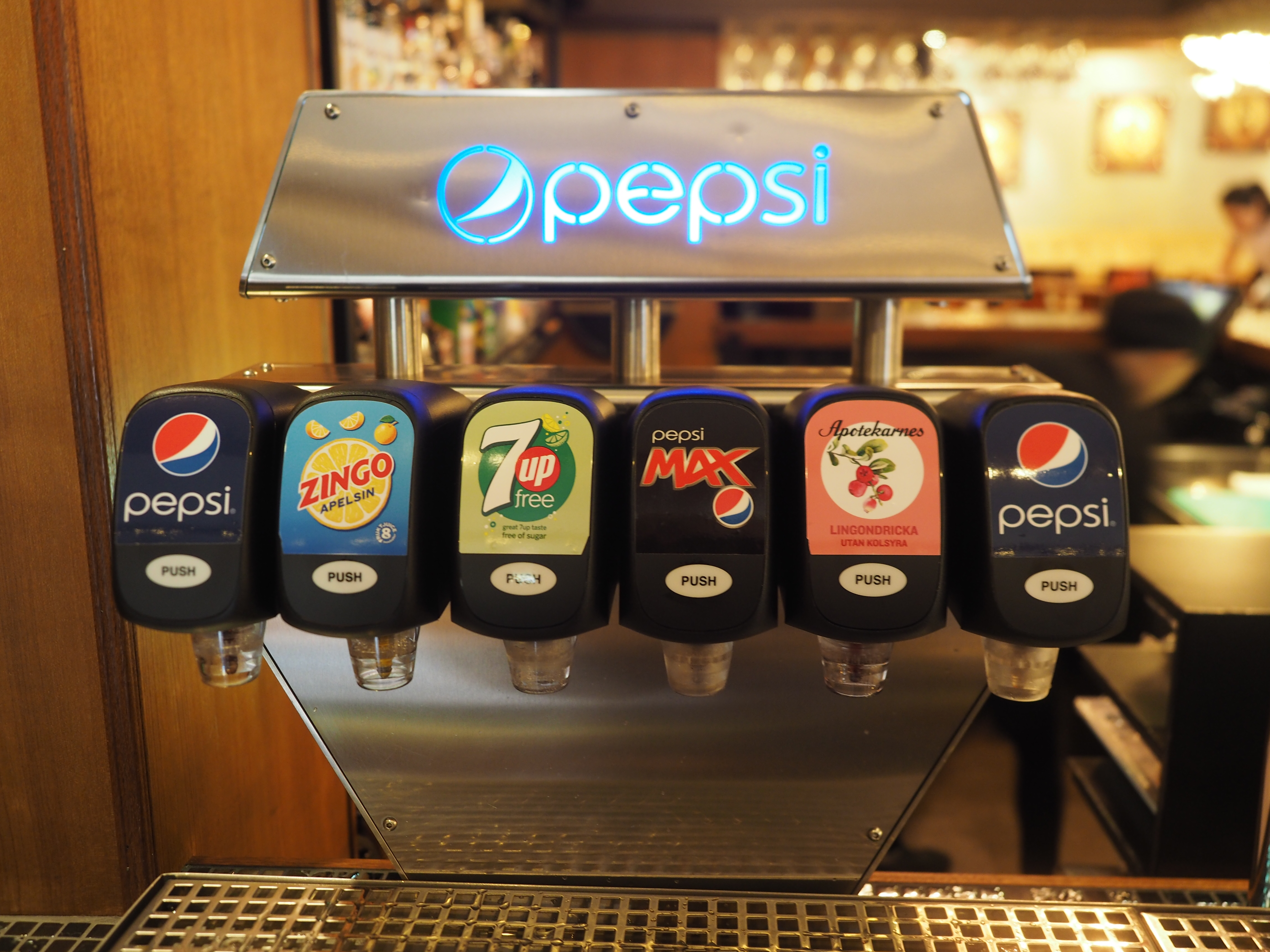
A soft drink dispenser serving lingonberry juice
