= Otthia =

Scientific classification
- Kingdom: Fungi
- Division: Ascomycota
- Class: Dothideomycetes
- Order: Botryosphaeriales
- Family: Botryosphaeriaceae
- Genus: Otthia; Nitschke ex Fuckel

Type species
- Otthia spiraeae (Fuckel) Fuckel

Species
- See text.

Genus of fungi

Otthia is a genus of fungi in the family Botryosphaeriaceae. There are about 76 species.

The genus name of Otthia is in honour of Gustav Heinrich Otth (1806-1874), who was a Swiss mycologist and military officer.

The genus was circumscribed by Theodor Rudolf Joseph Nitschke ex. Karl Wilhelm Gottlieb Leopold Fuckel in Jahrb. Nassauischen Vereins Naturk. vol.23-24 (Symb.Mycol.) on page 169 in 1870.

== Species ==
- Otthia aceris G.Winter
- Otthia alnea
- Otthia alni G.Winter
- Otthia ambiens
- Otthia amelanchieris
- Otthia amica
- Otthia artemisiae Byzova
- Otthia bertioides (Sacc. & Berl.) Höhn.
- Otthia brunaudiana Sacc., 1880
- Otthia buteae S.D.Patil & C.Ramesh
- Otthia caespitosa (Niessl) E.Müll.
- Otthia calligoni Kravtzev
- Otthia cassiae
- Otthia castilloae Syd. & P.Syd.
- Otthia clavata (E.Müll. & S.Ahmad) E.Müll.
- Otthia clematidis Earle
- Otthia coryli
- Otthia corylina
- Otthia deformans Pat.
- Otthia dendrostellerae Kravtzev
- Otthia deviata Syd.
- Otthia diminuta
- Otthia distegiae
- Otthia doberae
- Otthia dryadis L.Holm & Nograsek
- Otthia elaeagni (Rehm) Petr.
- Otthia fendlericola Earle
- Otthia flacourtiae P.Joly
- Otthia fruticola
- Otthia golovinii Frolov
- Otthia halimodendri Kravtzev
- Otthia haloxyli Kravtzev
- Otthia hazslinszkyi
- Otthia helvetica (H.Wegelin) Scheinpflug
- Otthia hungarica
- Otthia ilicis Fabre, 1882
- Otthia indica S.K.Bose & E.Müll.
- Otthia ingae (Henn.) Theiss.
- Otthia jacquemontiae
- Otthia lantanae Rehm
- Otthia lignyodes
- Otthia lilacis
- Otthia lisae (De Not.) Sacc.
- Otthia lycii Zerova
- Otthia lyciicola Urries
- Otthia monodiana
- Otthia nikitinii Kravtzev
- Otthia ostryogena
- Otthia panici
- Otthia pavlovii Schwarzman
- Otthia populina
- Otthia pteleae
- Otthia pulneyensis Subram. & Sekar
- Otthia pyri
- Otthia quercicola
- Otthia rhododendrophila
- Otthia ribis
- Otthia rubi Höhn.
- Otthia rubicola Petr.
- Otthia selaginellae (Racib.) Höhn.
- Otthia shearii Petr.
- Otthia smilacis (Racib.) Höhn.
- Otthia spartii Sibilia
- Otthia spiraeae (Fuckel) Fuckel
- Otthia staphyleae
- Otthia staphylina
- Otthia symphoricarpi
- Otthia tamarindi Tilak & R.Rao
- Otthia taxi Wollenw. & Hochapfel
- Otthia uleana (Sacc., Syd. & P.Syd.) Höhn.
- Otthia ulmi Fabre, 1878
- Otthia urceolata
- Otthia winteri
- Otthia wistariae
- Otthia xylostei
- Otthia ziziphi-jujubae Tilak & S.B.Kale

GBIF accepted species are one with added authors.

== See also ==
- List of Dothideomycetes genera incertae sedis
