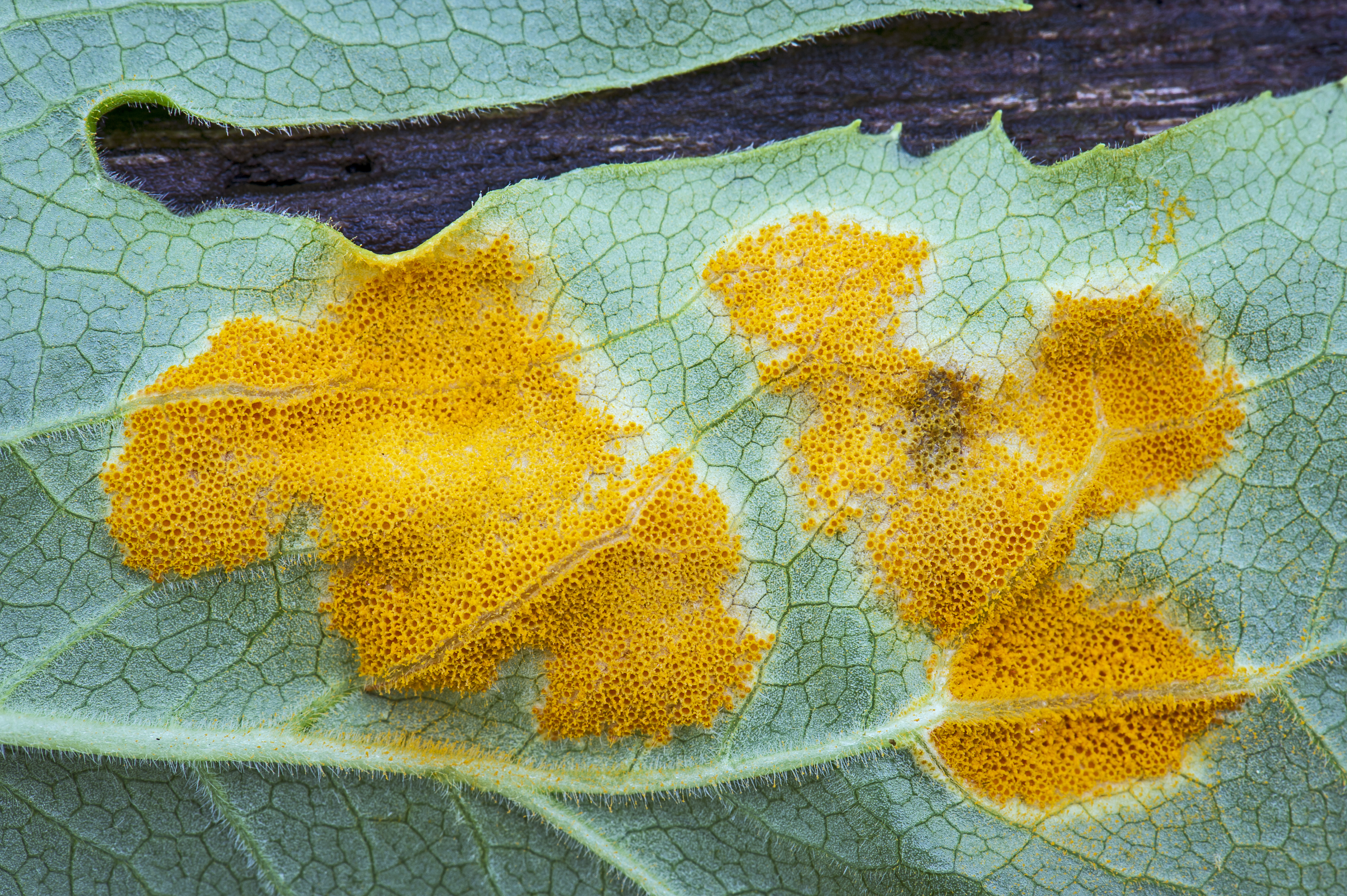
- Allodus podophylli

Scientific classification
- Domain: Eukaryota
- Kingdom: Fungi
- Division: Basidiomycota
- Class: Pucciniomycetes
- Order: Pucciniales
- Family: Pucciniastraceae
- Genus: Allodus; Arthur, 1906

Species
- See text

= Allodus =

Genus of fungi

Allodus is a genus of fungi in the family Pucciniastraceae.

== Species ==
Following a re-evaluation of the genus, a great many species of Allodus were transferred to the Puccinia genus.

The following species are accepted in the genus Allodus;

- Allodus giliae (Peck) Orton (1916)
- Allodus ludwigiae (Ellis & Everh.) Orton (1916)
- Allodus prostii (Moug. ex Duby) S. Ullah, Aime, M. Abbasi & Khalid (2019)
- Allodus rubicunda (Holw.) Arthur & Orton (1921)
- Allodus scaberistipes Arthur & Orton (1921)
- Allodus subangulata (Holw.) Orton (1916)
- Allodus superflua (Holw.) Orton (1916)
