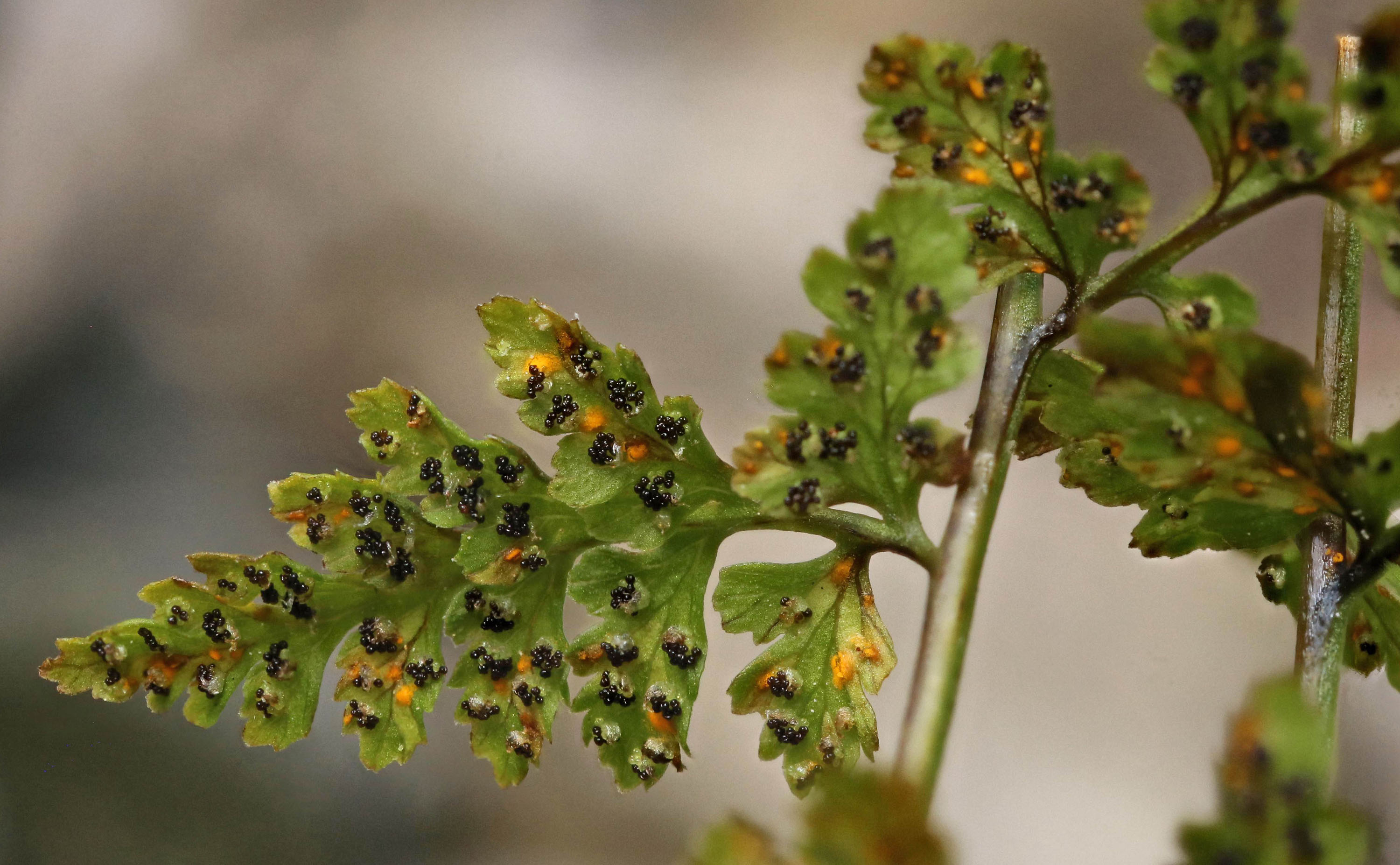
- Hyalopsora polypodii on Cystopteris fragilis, White Sands, North Wales

Scientific classification
- Kingdom: Fungi
- Division: Basidiomycota
- Class: Pucciniomycetes
- Order: Pucciniales
- Family: Pucciniastraceae
- Genus: Hyalopsora; Magnus

= Hyalopsora =

Genus of fungi

Hyalopsora is a genus of fungi belonging to the family Pucciniastraceae.

The species of this genus are found in Europe, Asia and Northern America.

Hyalnopsora is a rust fungus that primarily affects ferns

== Species ==
Species:

- Hyalopsora aculeata Kamei
- Hyalopsora adianti-capilli-veneris (DC.) Syd. & P.Syd.
- Hyalopsora aspidiotus (Peck) Magnus
- Hyalopsora erlangensis
