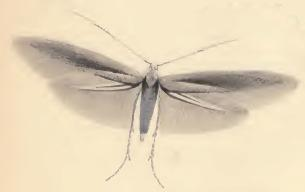

Scientific classification
- Kingdom: Animalia
- Phylum: Arthropoda
- Class: Insecta
- Order: Lepidoptera
- Family: Coleophoridae
- Genus: Coleophora
- Species: C. vitisella

Binomial name
- Coleophora vitisella Gregson, 1856

= Coleophora vitisella =

Species of moth

Coleophora vitisella is a moth of the family Coleophoridae. It is found from Fennoscandia and northern Russia to the Pyrenees and Italy and from Great Britain to Romania. The range extends to the Russian Far East. The species was recently discovered in Canada, with records from Yukon and Manitoba.

== Description ==
The wingspan is 10–13 mm (0.39–0.51 in). Adults are on wing from May to the beginning of July in western Europe.

=== Larva ===
The larvae feed on Pyrola species and Vaccinium vitis-idaea. Full-grown larvae can be found from September to April.

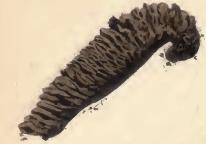
Larval case

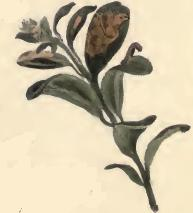
Sprig of Vaccinium vitis-idaea with mined leaves and a larva-case attached

Larva
