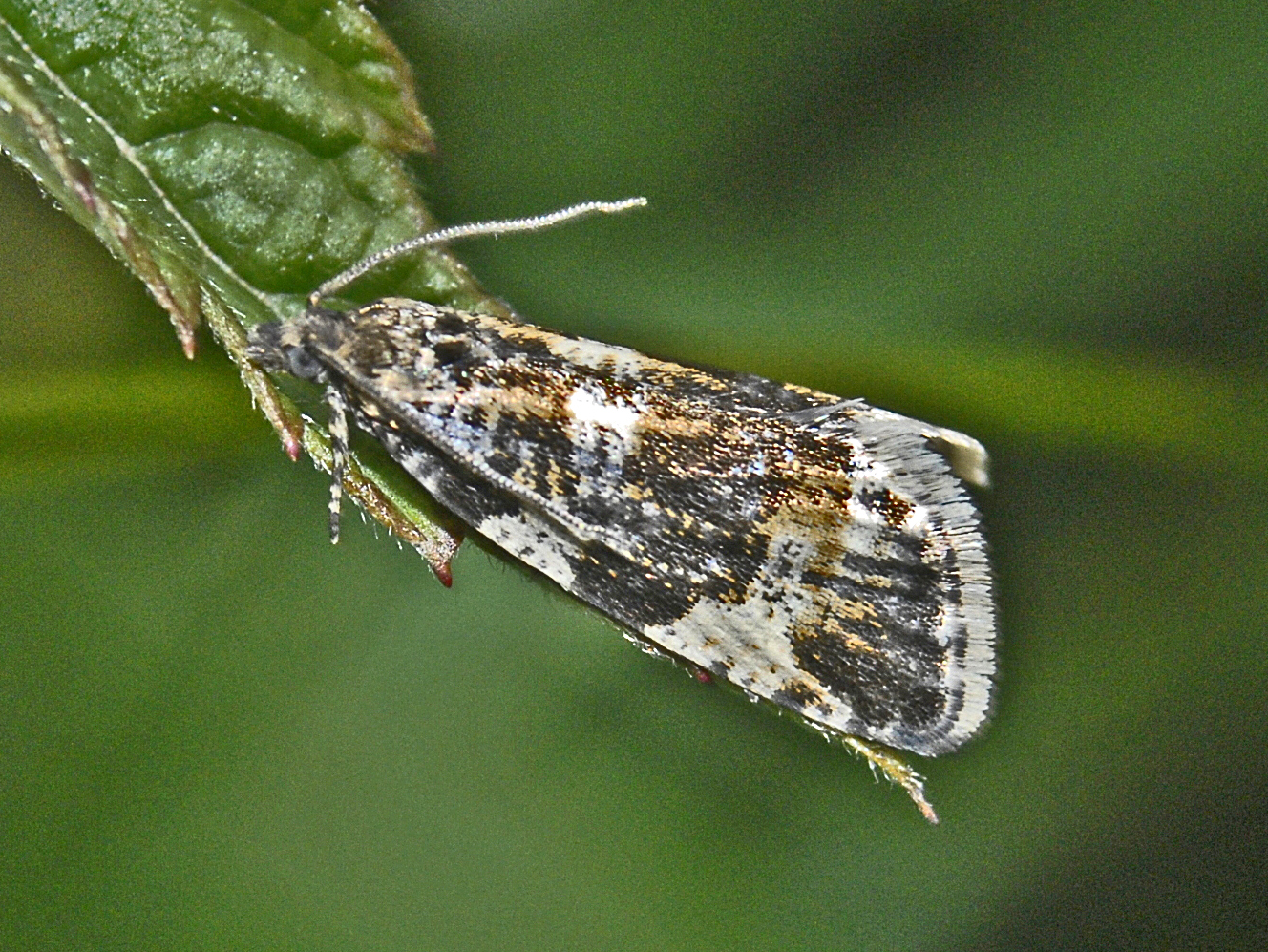
- Aterpia corticana

Scientific classification
- Domain: Eukaryota
- Kingdom: Animalia
- Phylum: Arthropoda
- Class: Insecta
- Order: Lepidoptera
- Family: Tortricidae
- Subfamily: Olethreutinae
- Tribe: Olethreutini
- Genus: Aterpia; Guenée, 1845

= Aterpia =

Genus of tortrix moths

Aterpia is a genus of moths belonging to the subfamily Olethreutinae of the family Tortricidae.

== Species ==
- Aterpia anderreggana (Guenée, 1845)
- Aterpia approximana (Heinrich, 1919)
- Aterpia asema (Diakonoff, 1973)
- Aterpia bicolor (Kawabe, 1978)
- Aterpia catarrhactopa (Meyrick, 1938)
- Aterpia chalybeia (Falkovitsh, 1966)
- Aterpia circumfluxana (Christoph, 1881)
- Aterpia corticana (Denis & Schiffermüller, 1775)
- Aterpia cretata (Diakonoff, 1953)
- Aterpia flavens (Falkovitsh, 1966)
- Aterpia flavipunctana (Christoph, 1882)
- Aterpia gypsopa (Diakonoff, 1953)
- Aterpia haematina (Diakonoff, 1953)
- Aterpia hemicapnodes (Diakonoff, 1953)
- Aterpia hemicyclica (Diakonoff, 1953)
- Aterpia issikii (Kawabe, 1980)
- Aterpia lucifera (Meyrick, 1909)
- Aterpia maturicolor (Diakonoff, 1973)
- Aterpia mensifera (Meyrick, 1916)
- Aterpia microchlamys (Diakonoff, 1983)
- Aterpia monada Razowski, 2013
- Aterpia nobilis (Diakonoff, 1973)
- Aterpia palliata (Meyrick, 1909)
- Aterpia phanerops (Diakonoff, 1960)
- Aterpia praeceps (Meyrick, 1909)
- Aterpia protosema (Diakonoff, 1973)
- Aterpia purpurascens (Diakonoff, 1953)
- Aterpia sappiroflua (Diakonoff, 1953)
- Aterpia semnodryas (Meyrick, 1936)
- Aterpia sieversiana (Nolcken, 1870)

== See also ==
- List of Tortricidae genera
