= Aterpia monada =

Scientific classification
- Kingdom: Animalia
- Phylum: Arthropoda
- Class: Insecta
- Order: Lepidoptera
- Family: Tortricidae
- Genus: Aterpia
- Species: A. monada

Binomial name
- Aterpia monada Razowski, 2013

Species of moth

Aterpia monada is a species of moth of the family Tortricidae first described by Józef Razowski in 2013. It is found on Seram Island in Indonesia. The habitat consists of upper montane forests.

The wingspan is about 19 mm.
