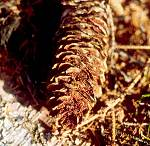
- Pucciniastrum areolatum

Scientific classification
- Domain: Eukaryota
- Kingdom: Fungi
- Division: Basidiomycota
- Class: Pucciniomycetes
- Order: Pucciniales
- Family: Pucciniastraceae
- Genus: Pucciniastrum; G.H.Otth (1861)

Type species
- Pucciniastrum epilobii (Chaillet) G.H.Otth (1861)

Synonyms
- Calyptospora J.G.Kühn (1869); Phragmopsora Magnus (1875)

= Pucciniastrum =

Genus of fungi

Pucciniastrum is a genus of Basidiomycota fungi. Pucciniastrum species, like all rust fungi, are obligate plant parasites.

The genus name of Pucciniastrum is in honour of Tommaso Puccini (died 1735), who was an Italian doctor and botanist who taught anatomy at Hospital of Santa Maria Nuova in Florence.

The genus was circumscribed by Gustav Heinrich Otth in Mitt. Naturf. Ges. Bern 476-479: 61, 71–75, 80–81, 84, 87 in 1861.

== Species ==
As accepted by Species Fungorum;

- Pucciniastrum aceris Syd. (1937)
- Pucciniastrum actinidiae Hirats. f. (1952)
- Pucciniastrum agrimoniae (Dietel) Tranzschel (1895)
- Pucciniastrum alaskanum Mains (1939)
- Pucciniastrum areolatum (Fr.) G.H. Otth (1864)
- Pucciniastrum asterum (Tranzschel) Jørst. (1958)
- Pucciniastrum beringianum Tranzschel (1939)
- Pucciniastrum boehmeriae (Dietel) Syd. & P. Syd. (1903)
- Pucciniastrum brachybotrydis (Tranzschel) Jørst. (1907)
- Pucciniastrum castaneae Dietel (1902)
- Pucciniastrum celastri Syd. & P. Syd. (1907)
- Pucciniastrum circaeae (Schumach.) Speg. (1888)
- Pucciniastrum clemensiae Arthur & Cummins (1937)
- Pucciniastrum corchoropsidis (Dietel) Dietel (1915)
- Pucciniastrum coriariae Dietel (1900)
- Pucciniastrum corni Dietel (1905)
- Pucciniastrum coronisporum Jing X. Ji & Kakish. (2019)
- Pucciniastrum coryli Kom. (1899)
- Pucciniastrum crawfurdiae Syd. (1931)
- Pucciniastrum crawfurdiae-japonicae Hirats. f. (1940)
- Pucciniastrum enkianthi Y.M. Liang & Kakish. (2011)
- Pucciniastrum epilobii G.H. Otth (1861)
- Pucciniastrum epilobii-dodonaei Dietel & Eichhorn (1942)
- Pucciniastrum fagi G. Yamada (1930)
- Pucciniastrum fuchsiae Hirats. f. (1927)
- Pucciniastrum gaultheriae Syd. & P. Syd. (1907)
- Pucciniastrum gentianae Hirats. f. & Hashioka (1935)
- Pucciniastrum goodyerae (Tranzschel) Arthur (1907)
- Pucciniastrum guttatum (J. Schröt.) Hyl., Jørst. & Nannf. (1953)
- Pucciniastrum hakkodense (S. Ito & Hirats. f.) Jørst. (1958)
- Pucciniastrum hikosanense Hirats. f. (1940)
- Pucciniastrum hydrangeae (Magnus) Arthur (1906)
- Pucciniastrum hydrangeae-petiolaris Hirats. f. (1927)
- Pucciniastrum ishikariense Hirats. f. (1936)
- Pucciniastrum ishiuchii Hirats. f. (1943)
- Pucciniastrum kusanoi Dietel (1903)
- Pucciniastrum magnisporum G.F. Laundon (1963)
- Pucciniastrum malloti Hirats. f. (1935)
- Pucciniastrum menziesiae (Hirats. f.) Jørst. (1958)
- Pucciniastrum mussaendae Syd. (1931)
- Pucciniastrum myosotidii McKenzie & Padamsee (2014)
- Pucciniastrum nipponicum (Hirats. f.) Jørst. (1958)
- Pucciniastrum pseudocerasi (Hirats. f.) Jørst. (1958)
- Pucciniastrum pyrolae (J.F. Gmel.) J. Schröt. (1880)
- Pucciniastrum rubiae (Kom.) Jørst. (1958)
- Pucciniastrum sparsum (G. Winter) E. Fisch. (1904)
- Pucciniastrum stachyuri Hirats. f. & Yoshin. (1935)
- Pucciniastrum symphyti (DC.) McKenzie & Padamsee (2014)
- Pucciniastrum tripetaleiae (Hirats. f.) Jørst. (1958)
- Pucciniastrum verruculosum Jing X. Ji & Kakish. (2019)
- Pucciniastrum wikstroemiae Arthur (1925)
- Pucciniastrum yoshinagae Hirats. f. (1931)
