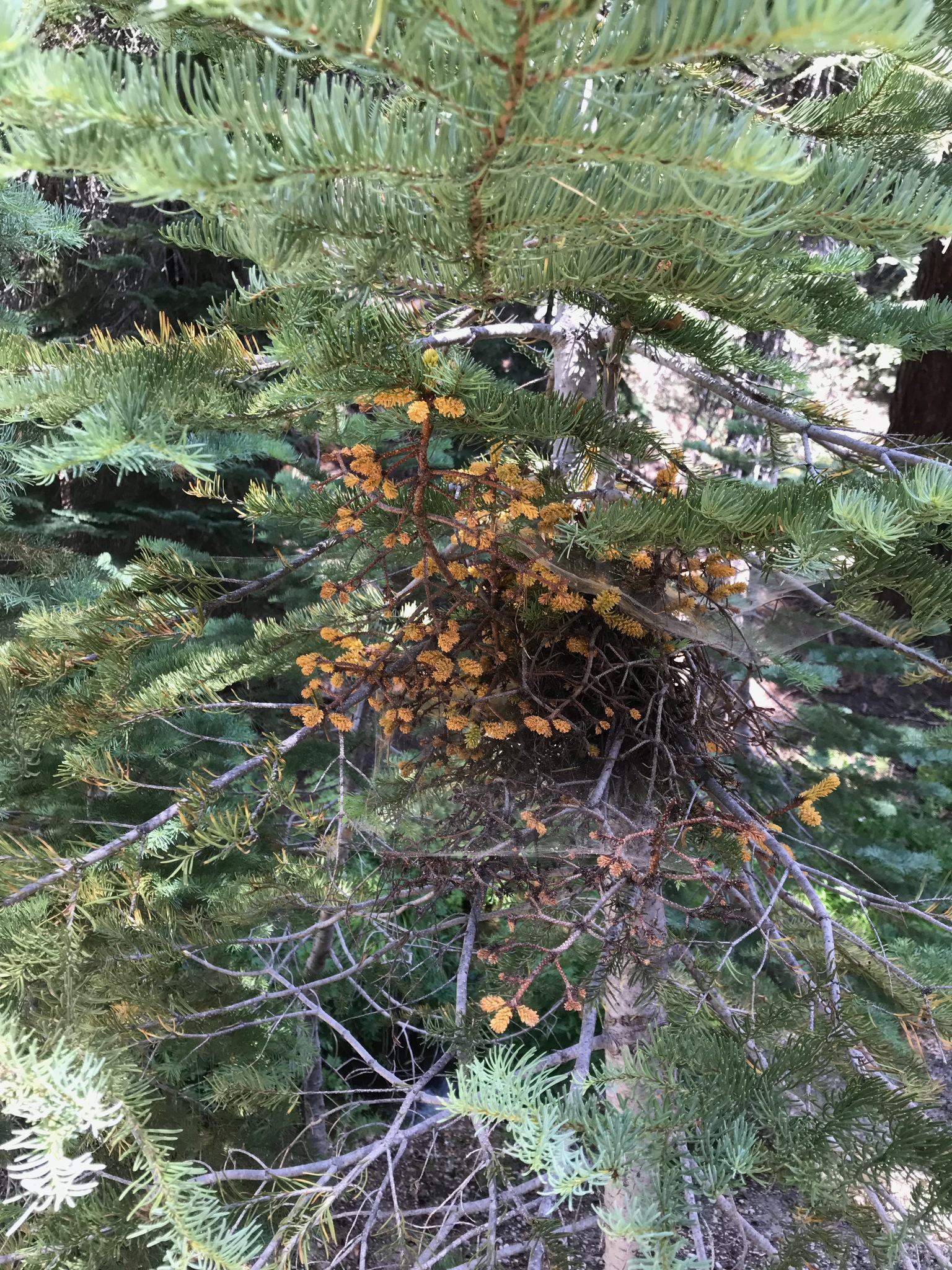
- fir broom rust caused by Melampsorella

Scientific classification
- Kingdom: Fungi
- Division: Basidiomycota
- Class: Pucciniomycetes
- Order: Pucciniales
- Family: Pucciniastraceae
- Genus: Melampsorella; J.Schröt.

= Melampsorella =

Genus of fungi

Melampsorella is a genus of plant pathogenic fungi belonging to the family Pucciniastraceae.

The species of this genus are found in Europe and Northern America.

Species:

- Melampsorella betulina (Fr.) Kleb.
- Melampsorella caryophyllacearum (DC.) J.Schröt.
- Melampsorella itoana (Hirats.f.) S.Ito & Homma
- Melampsorella rigida Har. & Pat.
