= Gustav Heinrich Otth =

Swiss mycologist (1806–1874)

Gustav Heinrich Otth (2 June 1806, in Bern – 8 November 1874) was a Swiss mycologist and military officer. Born in Bern to a family originally from Basel, Otth began his career in the military, serving in Swiss regiments in the Netherlands and Naples where he achieved the rank of captain-adjutant-major and was decorated for bravery. Following his retirement from military service in 1850, he turned to natural history and mycology, making contributions to fungal taxonomy despite lacking formal scientific training. His meticulous drawings, precise descriptions, and extensive herbarium specimens, primarily of fungi from the Bern and Thun regions, became valuable resources for mycological research and gained posthumous recognition in the scientific community.

== Early life and military career ==
Otth was born into a Bernese family originally from Basel, on 2 June 1806. His father, Karl Emanuel Otth, held the office of city accountant in Bern. Gustav Otth initially pursued a military career, beginning as a second lieutenant in Bernese infantry in 1824. He later served in the Swiss regiments in the Netherlands and Naples, advancing to the rank of captain-adjutant-major. During his service, Otth participated in several battles, including the barricade fighting in Naples and campaigns in Messina and Catania, where he was wounded and later decorated for bravery. Disillusioned by political changes in Naples, Otth retired from military service in 1850 and returned to Switzerland.

== Scientific career ==
Otth turned to natural history and mycology in the 1850s, partly influenced by his brother Carl Adolf (1803–1839), who was also a naturalist. He closely collaborated with the noted Swiss mycologist Gabriel Trog. Despite entering the field later in life and lacking formal scientific training, Otth rapidly developed a keen observational skill, exceptional accuracy in fungal taxonomy, and a talent for detailed scientific illustration. His meticulous drawings and extensive herbarium specimens, now housed at the Botanical Institute of the University of Bern, remain valuable resources for mycological research.

Otth's work was primarily descriptive, and he made significant contributions to the understanding of fungi from the regions around Bern and Thun. His comprehensive collections and precise descriptions have provided essential baseline data for later mycologists. An example was his work on the Pyrenomycetes and rust fungi (Uredinales), where he accurately recognised and described numerous species, many of which were later validated by modern studies.

His scientific output was primarily published in the Mitteilungen der Naturforschenden Gesellschaft in Bern, including several additions to Gabriel Trog's catalogue of Swiss fungi. Many species described by Otth went unnoticed for decades until revisited by later mycologists, such as Alexander de Jaczewski and Pier Andrea Saccardo, who praised the precision and quality of his work. Several fungal genera and species, such as Otthia and Agaricus otthii, were named in his honour.

== Legacy ==
Otth's meticulous work in fungal taxonomy eventually gained recognition posthumously, significantly influencing subsequent mycological research. His herbarium and fungal illustrations are recognised today as valuable historical and scientific resources. Despite his initial obscurity, modern fungal taxonomy has validated and integrated much of his original descriptive work.

== Associated publications ==
- "Ueber die Brand- und Rostpilze: vorgetragen den 23. Februar und 9. März 1861", (1861).
- "Gustav Otth ein bernischer Pilzforscher, 1806-1874", (1908, with E. Fischer).
