= Ernst Hofmann (entomologist) =

German entomologist

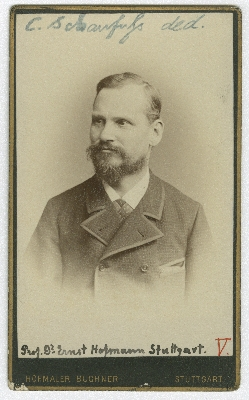
Ernst Hofmann

Ernst Hofmann (1837 Frankfurt am Main – 1892 Stuttgart) was a German entomologist who specialised in Lepidoptera. He is not to be confused with Ottmar Hofmann who was an entomologist specialising in Lepidoptera as well.

Also a zoologist, Ernst Hofmann trained as an apothecary and later became the curator of the Naturalienkabinett in Stuttgart. His collections of Psychidae, Sesiidae, Tortricidae, Tineidae and Pterophoridae are held by Natural History Museum, London. Others (macrolepidoptera) are held by the National Museum of Natural History in Washington. He wrote parts of the multi-volume work Die Schmetterlinge Europas (The Lepidoptera of Europe), published in 1908. This was for decades a standard in the study of Lepidoptera.
