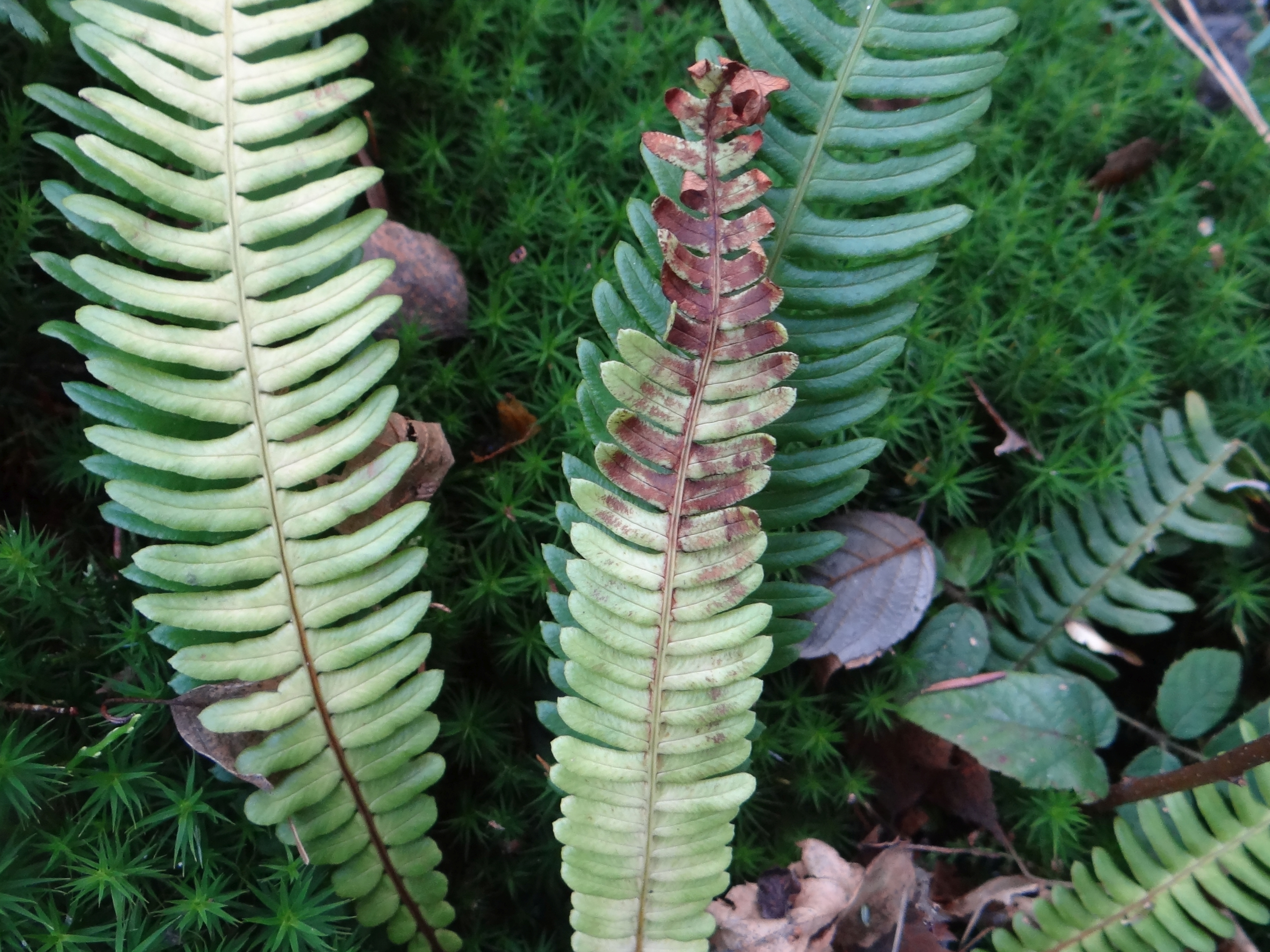
- Milesina blechni on leaf of Blechnum spicant found in Trzciana, Lesser Poland Voivodeship

Scientific classification
- Kingdom: Fungi
- Division: Basidiomycota
- Class: Pucciniomycetes
- Order: Pucciniales
- Family: Pucciniastraceae
- Genus: Milesina; Magnus

= Milesina (fungus) =

Genus of fungi

Milesina is a genus of rust fungi belonging to the family Pucciniastraceae.

These fungi are obligate plant pathogens, mostly known for infecting ferns and conifers, particularly species of the genus Abies (fir trees). They are heteroecious biotrophic parasites alternating between conifer and fern hosts.

The genus has cosmopolitan distribution. Milesina species are important in forest ecosystems as they regulate host populations and contribute to biodiversity through complex host interactions. However, they are not known to cause major economic damage.

== Species ==
Species:

- Milesina andina (Faull) Hirats.
- Milesina arisanense Hirats.
- Milesina asplenii-incisi (Faull) Hirats.
- Mileisna blechni
- Mileisna carpatica
- Mileisna exigua
- Mileisna feurichii
- Mileisna kriegeriana
- Mileisna murariae
- Mileisna polypodii
- Mileisna scolopendrii
- Mileisna thailandica
- Mileisna vogesiaca
- Mileisna scolopendrii
- Mileisna whitei
- Mileisna woodwardiana
