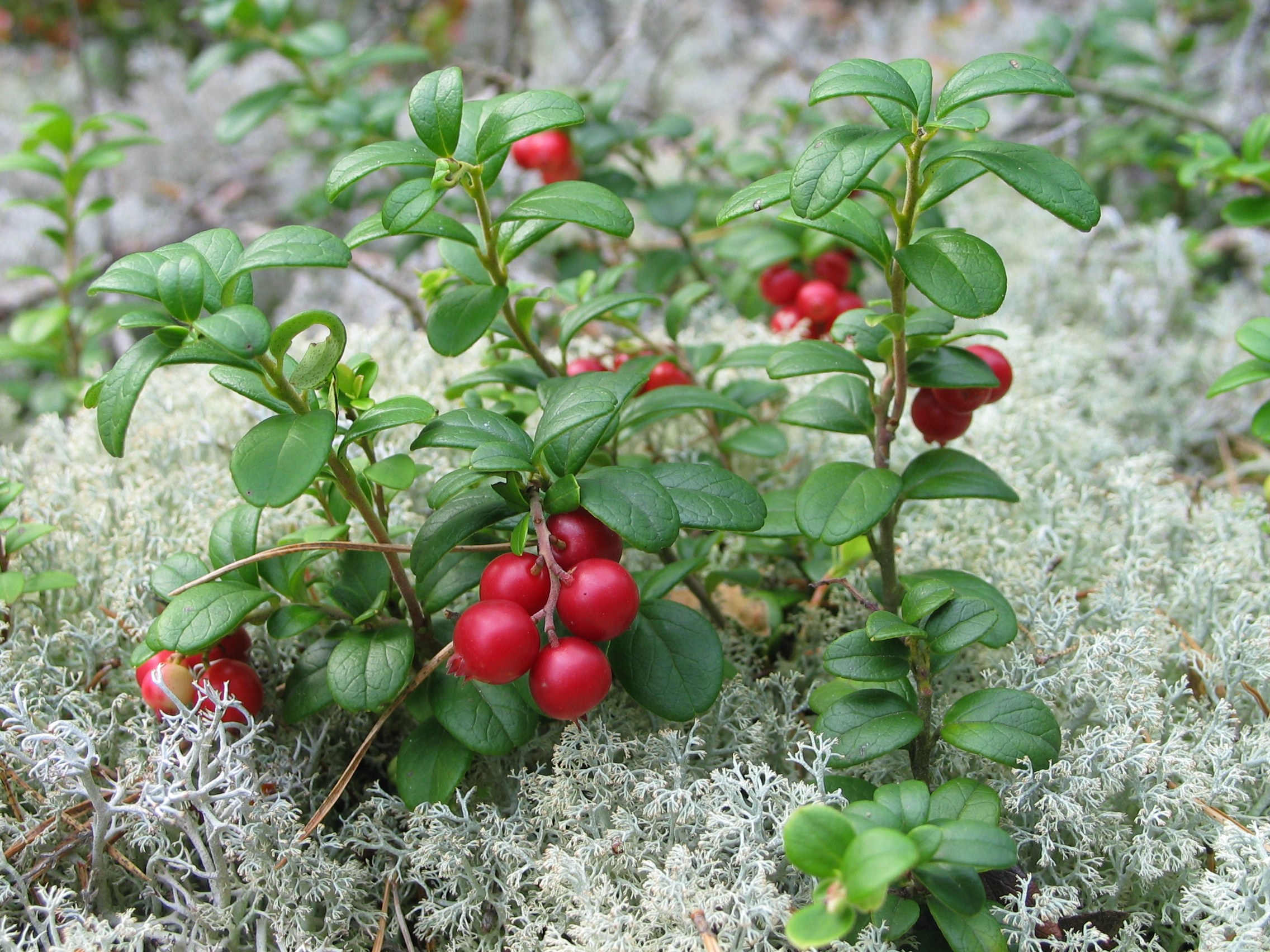
- Vaccinium vitis-idaea var. vitis-idaea surrounded by reindeer lichen

Conservation status
- Least Concern (IUCN 3.1)

- Secure (NatureServe)

Scientific classification
- Kingdom: Plantae
- Clade: Tracheophytes
- Clade: Angiosperms
- Clade: Eudicots
- Clade: Asterids
- Order: Ericales
- Family: Ericaceae
- Genus: Vaccinium
- Species: V. vitis-idaea

Binomial name
- Vaccinium vitis-idaea L. 1753

Synonyms
- Synonymy: Myrtillus exigua Bubani; Rhodococcum vitis-idaea Avrorin; Vaccinium jesoense Miq.; Vitis-idaea punctata Moench; Vitis-idaea punctifolia Gray; Rhodococcum minus (Lodd., G.Lodd. & W.Lodd.) Avrorin; Vaccinium vitis-idaea var. minus Lodd., G.Lodd. & W.Lodd.; Vitis-idaea punctata var. minor (Lodd., G.Lodd. & W.Lodd.) Moldenke

= Vaccinium vitis-idaea =

Lingonberry

Species of shrub with edible fruit

Vaccinium vitis-idaea is a small evergreen shrub in the heath family Ericaceae. It is known colloquially as the lingonberry, partridgeberry, (Note: This name usually refers to Mitchella repens.) foxberry, mountain cranberry, or cowberry. It is native to the boreal forest and Arctic tundra throughout the Northern Hemisphere.

The edible berries are commercially cultivated in the United States and the Netherlands. They are also picked in the wild and used in various cuisines.

== Description ==
Vaccinium vitis-idaea spreads by underground stems to form dense clonal colonies. Slender and brittle roots grow from the underground stems. The stems are rounded in cross-section and grow from 10 to 40 cm (4 to 16 in) in height. Leaves grow alternately and are oval, 5–30 mm (1/4–1 1/8 in) long, with a slightly wavy margin, and sometimes with a notched tip.

The flowers are bell-shaped, white to pale pink, 3–8 mm (1/8–3/8 in) long. V. vitis-idaea begins to produce flowers from five to ten years of age. They are pollinated by multiple insect species, including Andrena lapponica and several species of bumblebee.

The fruit is a red berry 6–10 mm (1/4–3/8 in) across, with an acidic taste, ripening in late summer to autumn. While bitter early in the season, they sweeten if left on the branch through winter. Cytology is 2n = 24. Its fruit persists for an average of 13.4 days, and bears an average of 11.2 seeds per fruit. Fruits average 84.9% water, and their dry weight includes 15.4% carbohydrates and 1.5% lipids.

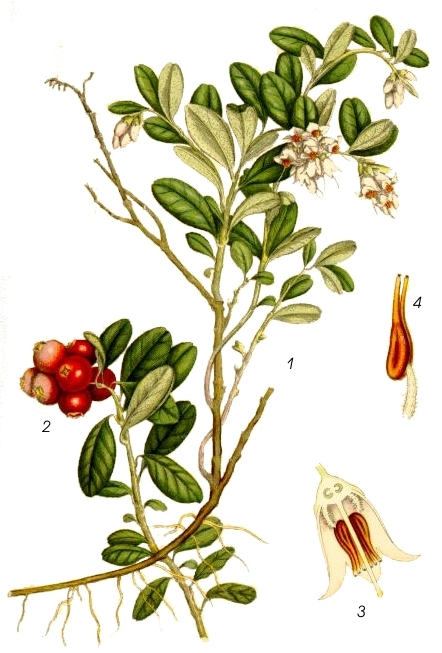
19th-century illustration

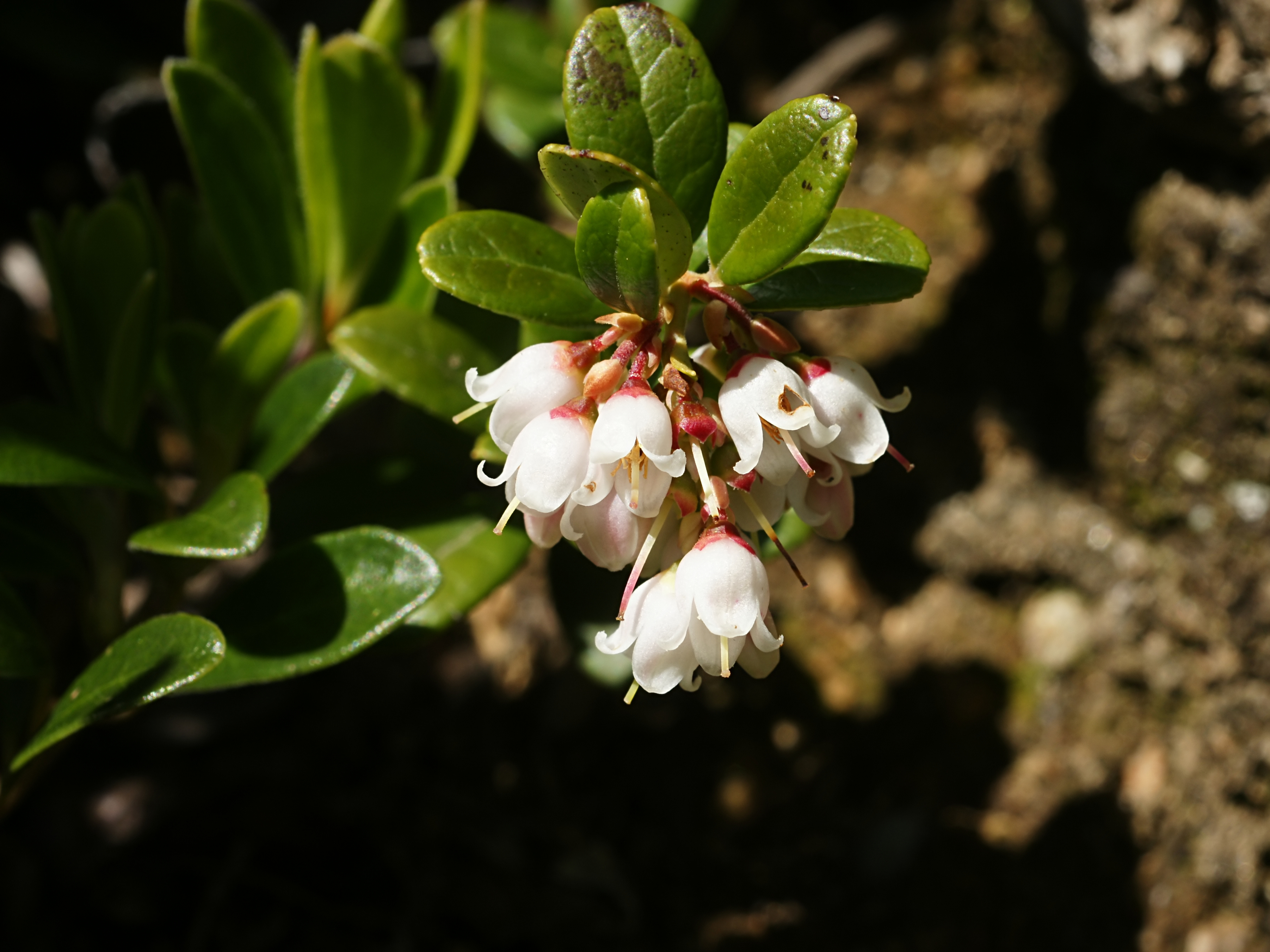
Flowers

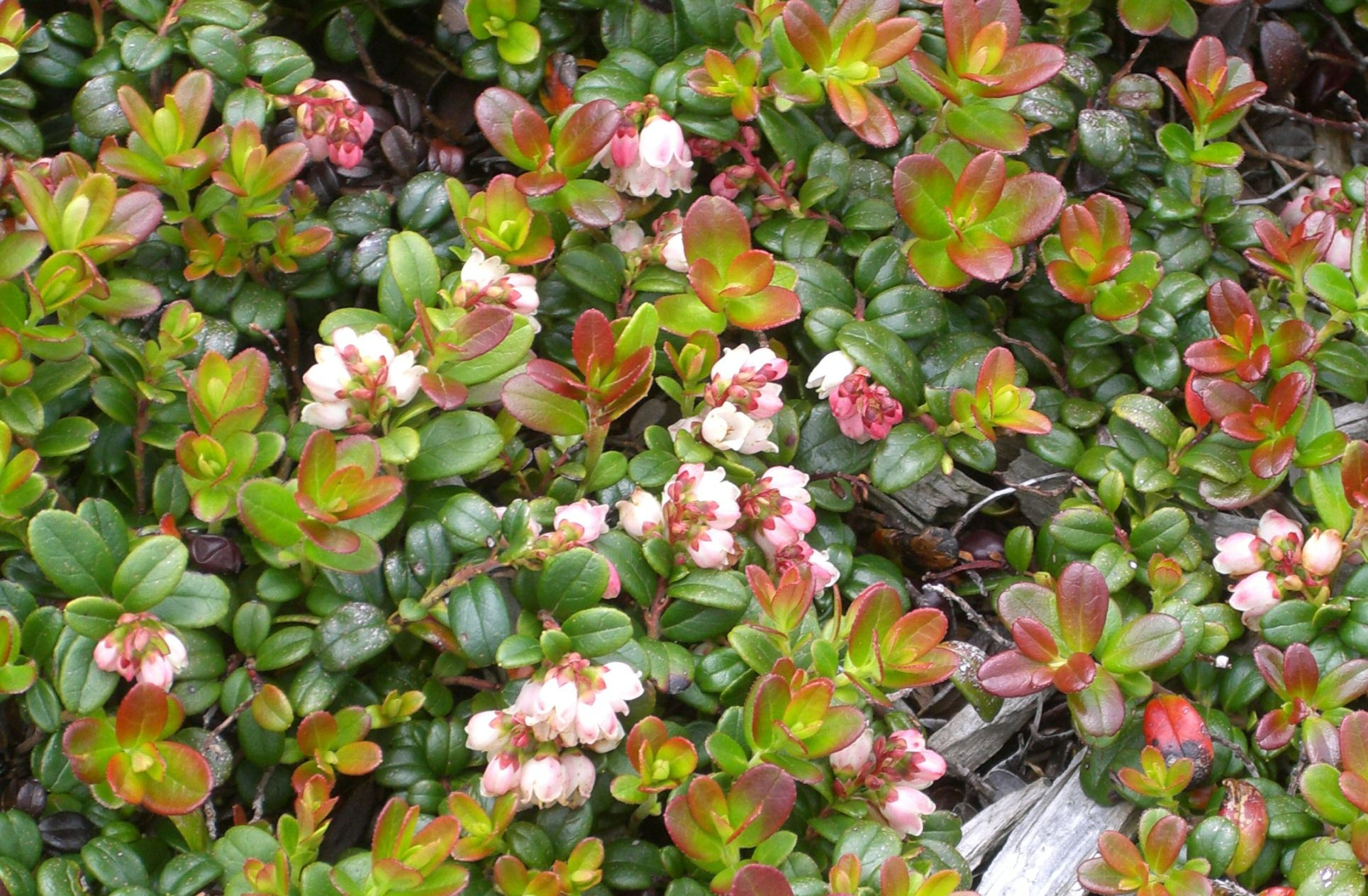
Flowers and young shoots

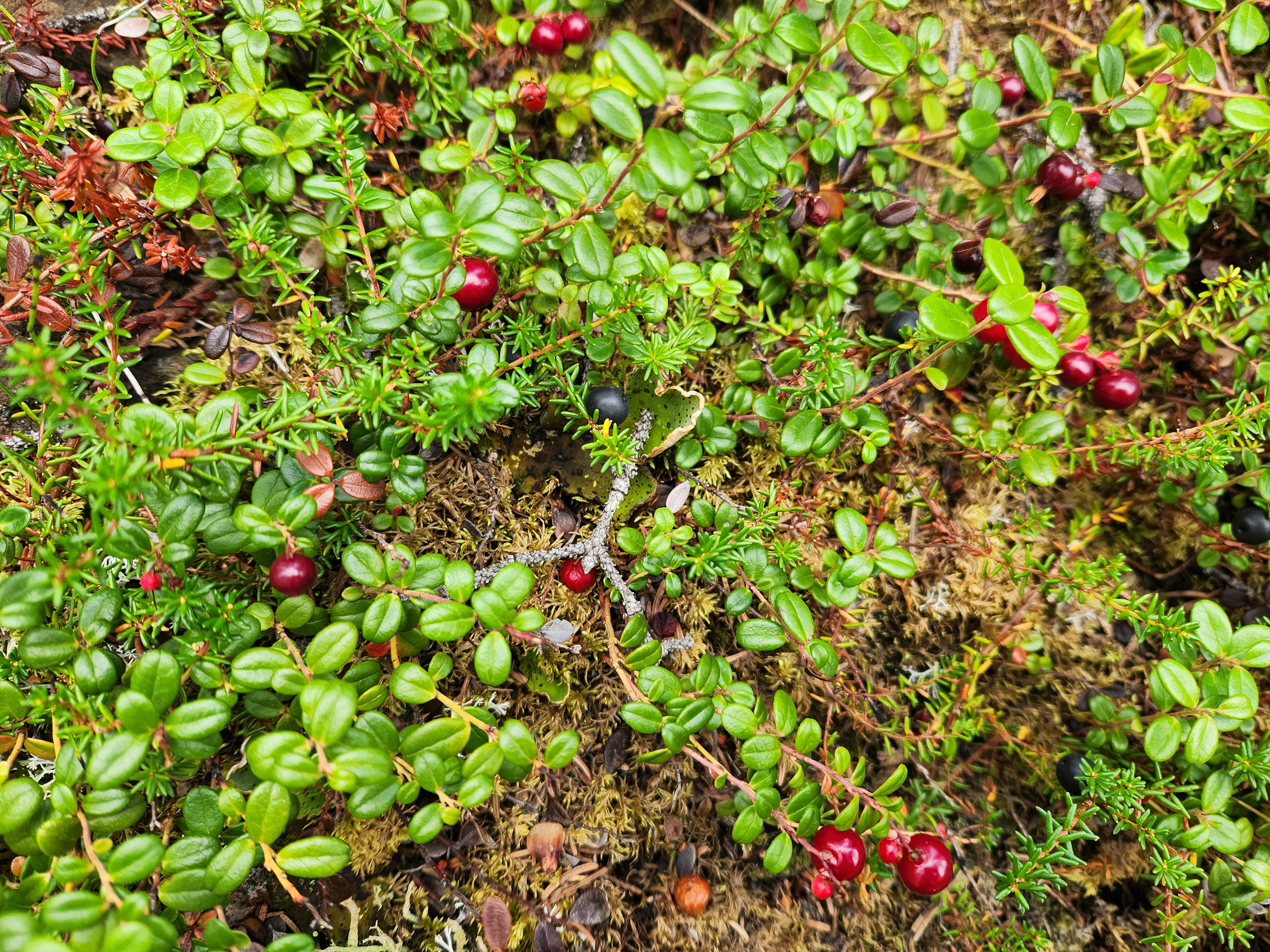
V. vitis-idaea and Empetrum nigrum in Denali National Park

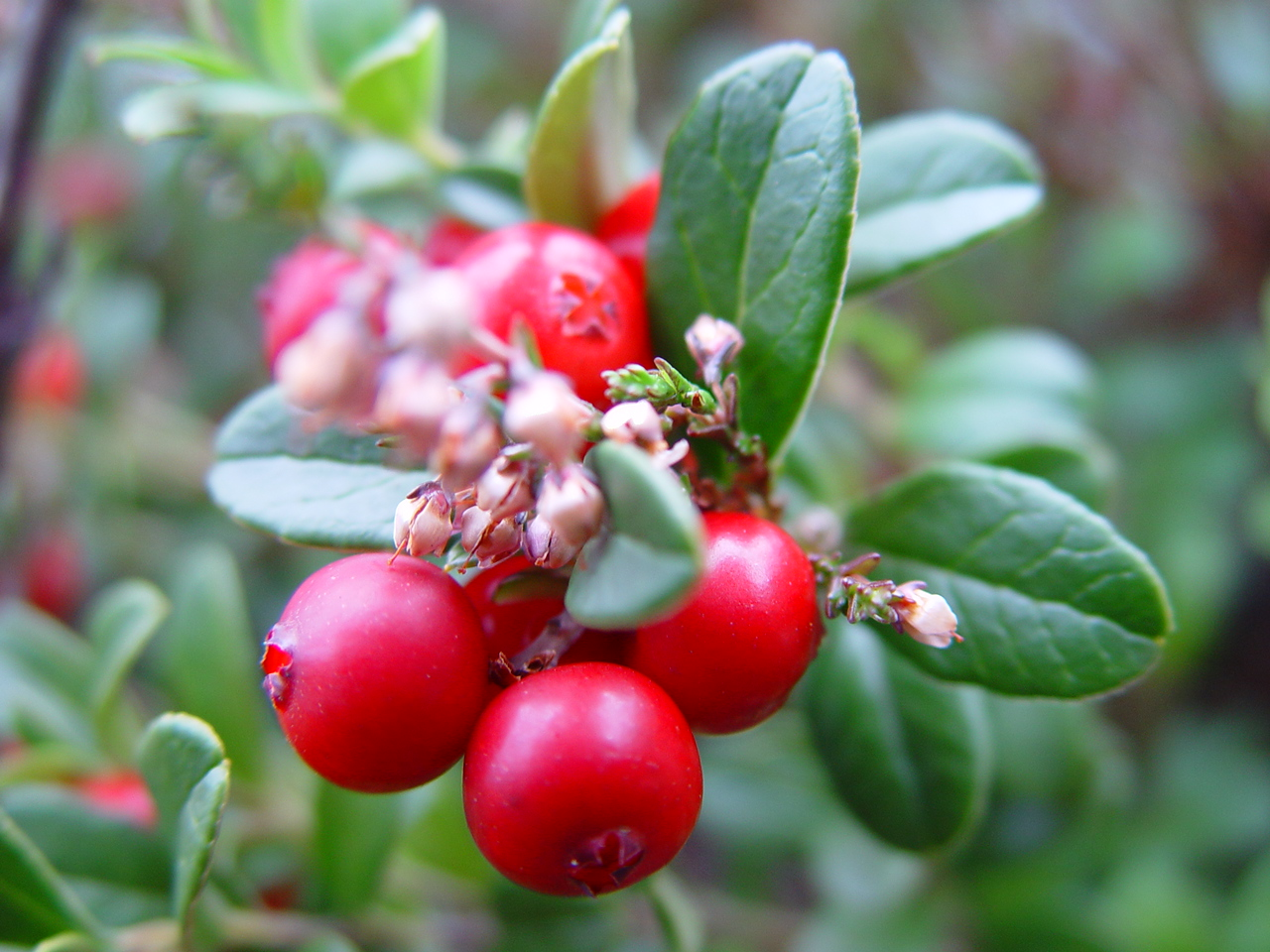
Ripe lingonberries

=== Related species ===
Vaccinium vitis-idaea differs from the related cranberries in having white flowers with petals partially enclosing the stamens and stigma, rather than pink flowers with petals reflexed backwards, and rounder, less pear-shaped berries. Vaccinium oxycoccos is similar.

Hybrids between V. vitis-idaea and V. myrtillus, named Vaccinium × intermedium Ruthe, are occasionally found in Europe.

== Taxonomy ==
=== Varieties ===
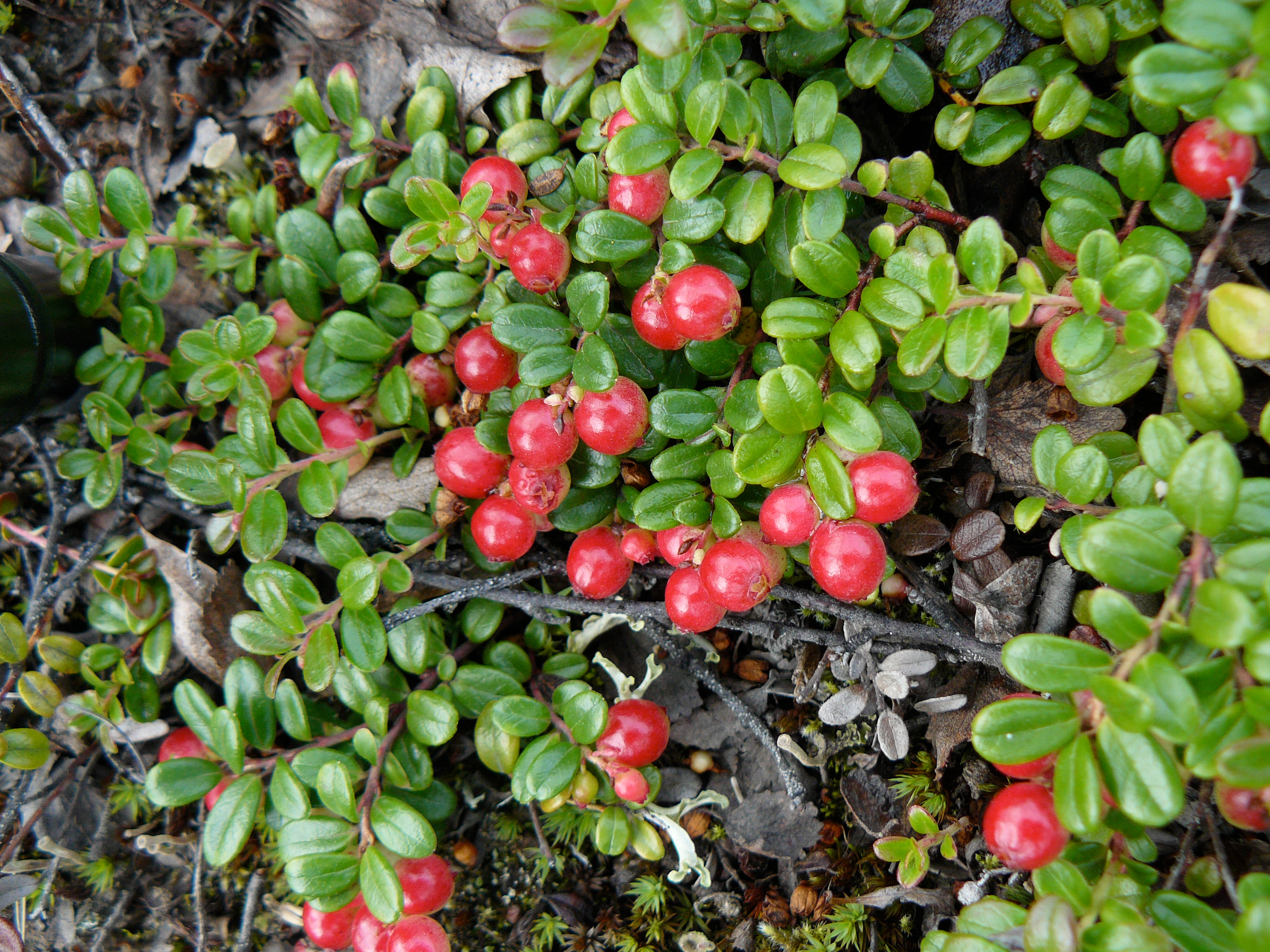
Vaccinium vitis-idaea var. minus

There are two regional varieties or subspecies of V. vitis-idaea, one in Eurasia and one in North America, differing in leaf size:

- V. vitis-idaea var. vitis-idaea L.—syn. V. vitis-idaea subsp. vitis-idaea.
  cowberry. Eurasia. Leaves are 10–30 mm (1/2–1 1/4 in) long.
- V. vitis-idaea var. minus Lodd.—syn. V. vitis-idaea subsp. minus (Lodd.) Hultén.
  lingonberry. North America. Leaves are 5–18 mm (1/4–3/4 in) long.

=== Etymology ===
Vaccinium vitis-idaea is most commonly known in English as 'lingonberry' or 'cowberry'. The name 'lingonberry' originates from the Swedish name lingon ([ˈlɪŋɔn]) for the species deriving from Old Norse lyngr, a cognate (thus also a doublet) to 'ling'.

The genus name Vaccinium is a classical Latin name for a plant, possibly the bilberry or hyacinth, and may be derived from the Latin bacca, 'berry'. The specific name is derived from Latin vitis ('vine') and idaea, the feminine form of idaeus (literally 'from Mount Ida', used in reference to raspberries Rubus idaeus).

Worldwide, Vaccinium vitis-idaea is known by at least 25 other common English names, including:

- bearberry
- beaverberry
- cougarberry
- foxberry
- lowbush cranberry
- mountain bilberry
- mountain cranberry
- partridgeberry (in Newfoundland and Cape Breton Island)
- quailberry
- red whortleberry
- redberry (in Labrador and the Lower North Shore of Quebec)

== Distribution and habitat ==
It is native to boreal forest and Arctic tundra throughout the Northern Hemisphere, including Eurasia and North America.

== Ecology ==
Vaccinium vitis-idaea keeps its leaves all winter even in the coldest years, unusual for a broad-leaved plant, though in its natural habitat it is usually protected from severe cold by snow cover. It is extremely hardy, tolerating temperatures as low as −50 °F (−45 °C) or lower, but grows poorly where summers are hot. It prefers some shade (as from a forest canopy) and constantly moist, acidic soil. Nutrient-poor soils are tolerated but not alkaline soils.

== Conservation ==
The plant is endangered in Michigan. The minus subspecies is listed as a species of special concern and believed extirpated in Connecticut.

== Cultivation ==
Lingonberry has been commercially cultivated in the Netherlands, Germany, Sweden, Poland, the United States (including the Pacific Northwest) and Latvia since the 1960s.

Some cultivars are grown for their ornamental rather than culinary value. In the United Kingdom, the Koralle Group has gained the Royal Horticultural Society's Award of Garden Merit.

== Uses ==
=== Culinary ===
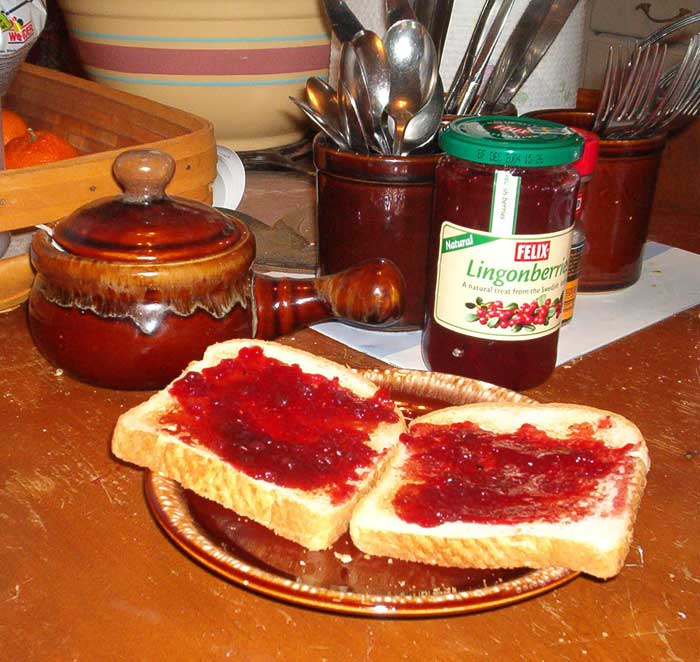
Lingonberry jam on toast.

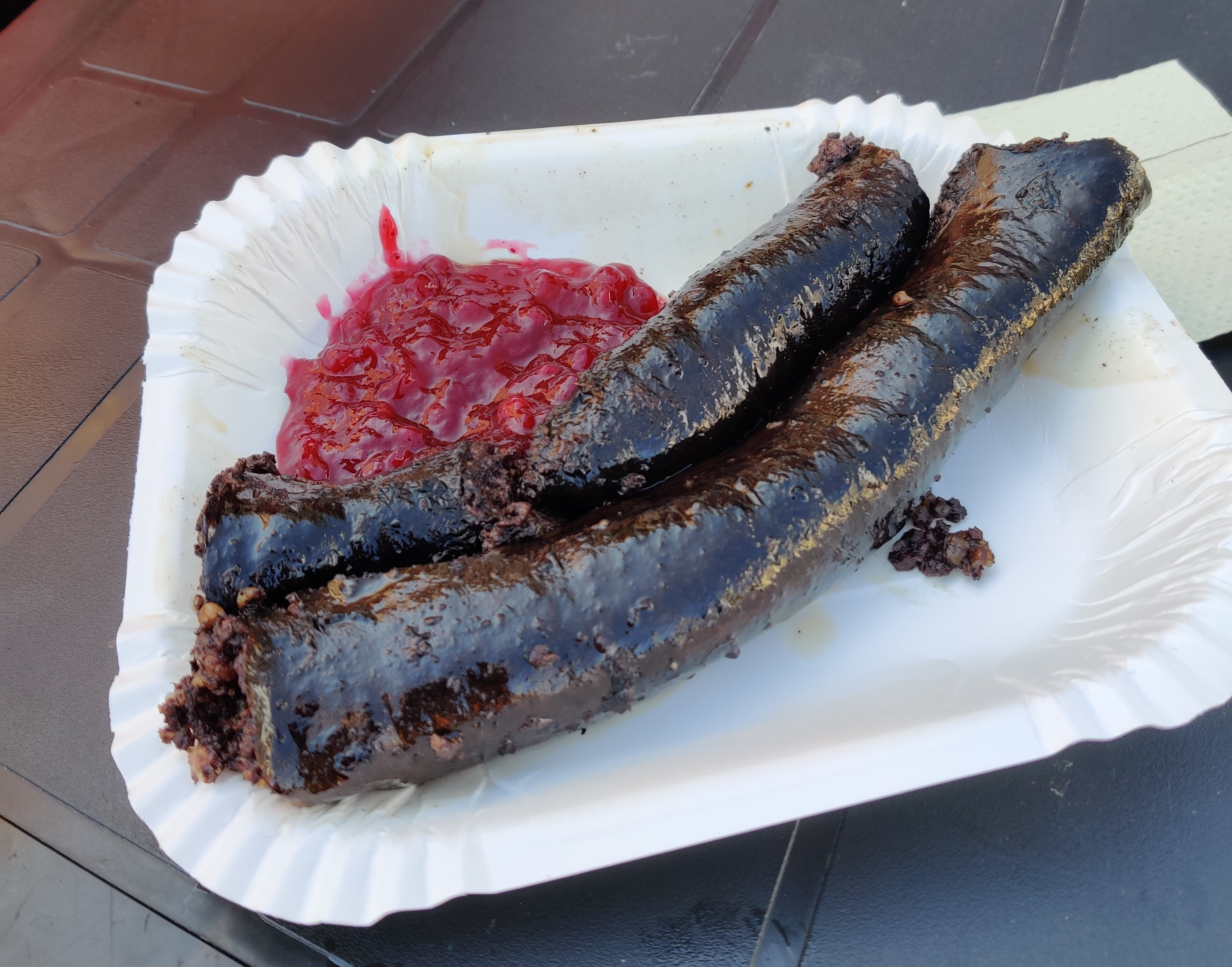
Lingonberry jam with mustamakkara blood sausages, a traditional food in Tampere, Finland.

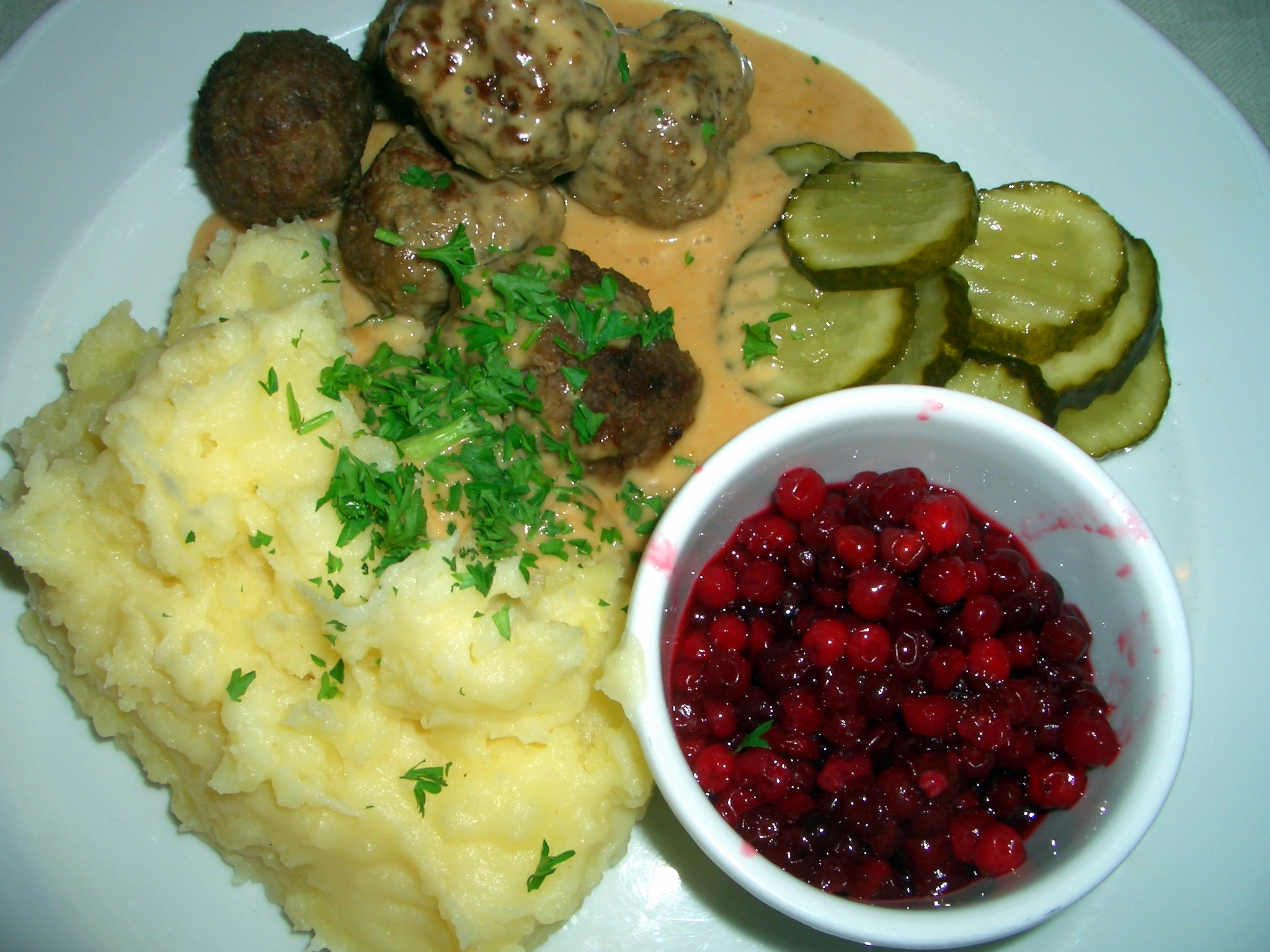
Swedish meatballs served with a side of lingonberry jam.

Raw lingonberries are 86% water, 13% carbohydrates, 1% protein, and contain negligible fat. In a 100-gram (3.5-ounce) reference amount, lingonberries supply 54 kcal, and are low-to-moderate sources of vitamin C, B vitamins, and dietary minerals.

The berries collected in the wild are a popular fruit in northern, central and eastern Europe, notably in the Nordic countries, the Baltic states, and northern and central Europe. In some areas, they can be picked legally on both public and private lands in accordance with the freedom to roam.

The berries are quite tart, so they are often cooked and sweetened before eating as lingonberry jam, compote, juice, smoothie or syrup. The raw fruits are also frequently simply mashed with sugar. Fruit served this way or as compote often accompanies game and liver dishes.

In Sweden the traditional Swedish meatballs are served with lingonberry jam alongside boiled or mashed potatoes and gravy sauce. In Sweden, Finland and Norway, reindeer and elk steaks are traditionally served with gravy and lingonberry sauce. Preserved fruit is commonly eaten with meatballs, as well as potato pancakes. A traditional Swedish dessert is lingonpäron (literally 'lingonberry pears'), consisting of fresh pears which are peeled, boiled and preserved in lingondricka (lingonberry juice) and is commonly eaten during Christmas. This was very common in old times, because it was an easy way to preserve pears. In Sweden and Russia, when sugar was still a luxury item, the berries were usually preserved simply by putting them whole into bottles of water. This was known as vattlingon (watered lingonberries); the procedure preserved them until next season. This was also a home remedy against scurvy.

This traditional Russian soft drink, known as lingonberry water (similar to mors), is mentioned by Alexander Pushkin in Eugene Onegin. In Russian folk medicine, lingonberry water was used as a mild laxative. A traditional Finnish dish is sautéed reindeer (poronkäristys) with mashed potatoes and lingonberries on the side, either raw, thawed or as a jam. In Finland, whipped semolina pudding flavored with lingonberry (puolukkapuuro) is also popular. In Poland, the berries are often mixed with pears to create a sauce served with poultry or game. The berries can also be used to replace redcurrants when creating Cumberland sauce.

The berries are also popular as a wild picked fruit or fruit crop in Newfoundland and Labrador, where they are locally known as partridgeberries or redberries. In this region they are incorporated into jams, syrups, fruit wines, cocktail bitters, sauces, and baked goods, such as pies, scones, cakes, and muffins.

In Sweden lingonberries are often sold as jam and juice, and as a key ingredient in dishes. They are used to make Lillehammer berry liqueur; and, in East European countries, lingonberry vodka is sold, and vodka with lingonberry juice or mors is a cocktail.

The berries are an important food for bears and foxes, and many fruit-eating birds. Caterpillars of the case-bearer moths Coleophora glitzella, Coleophora idaeella and Coleophora vitisella are obligate feeders on V. vitis-idaea leaves.

==== Indigenous North American cuisine ====
Alaska natives mix the berries with rose hip pulp and sugar to make jam, cook the berries as a sauce, and store the berries for future use. The Dakelh use the berries to make jam. The Koyukon freeze the berries for winter use. Inuit dilute and sweeten the juice to make a beverage, freeze and store the berries for spring, and use the berries to make jams and jellies. The Iñupiat use the berries to make two different desserts, one in which the berries are whipped with frozen fish eggs and eaten, and one in which raw berries are mashed with canned milk and seal oil. They also make a dish of the berries cooked with fish eggs, fish (whitefish, sheefish or pike) and blubber.

The Upper Tanana boil the berries with sugar and flour to thicken; eat the raw berries, either plain or mixed with sugar, grease or a combination of the two; fry them in grease with sugar or dried fish eggs; or make them into pies, jam, and jelly. They also preserve the berries alone or in grease and store them in a birchbark basket in an underground cache, or freeze them.

===== Use of the minus subspecies =====
The Anticosti people use the fruit to make jams and jellies. The Nihithawak Cree store the berries by freezing them outside during the winter, mix the berries with boiled fish eggs, livers, air bladders and fat and eat them, eat the berries raw as a snack food, or stew them with fish or meat. The Iñupiat of Nelson Island eat the berries, as do the Iñupiat of the Northern Bering Sea and Arctic regions of Alaska, as well as the Inuvialuit. The Haida people, Hesquiaht First Nation, Wuikinuxv and Tsimshian all use the berries as food.

=== Traditional medicine ===
In traditional medicine, V. vitis-idaea was used as an apéritif and astringent. The Upper Tanana ate the berries or used their juice to treat minor respiratory disorders.

=== Other uses ===
The Nihithawak Cree use the berries of the minus subspecies to color porcupine quills, and put the firm, ripe berries on a string to wear as a necklace. The Western Canadian Inuit use the minus subspecies as a tobacco additive or substitute.

In Newfoundland and Labrador, lingonberries or lingonberry extracts are frequently used in handmade soaps and candles.
