= Ottmar Hofmann =

German entomologist

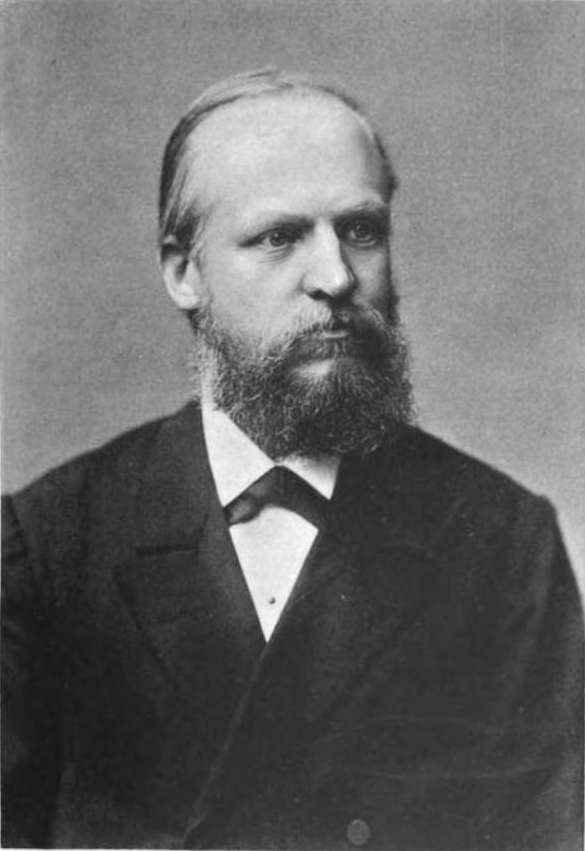
- Born: 20 September 1835; Frankfurt am Main
- Died: 22 February 1900 (aged 64); Regensburg

Ottmar Hofmann (20 September 1835, in Frankfurt am Main – 22 February 1900, in Regensburg) was a German entomologist. He is not to be confused with Ernst Hofmann, also an entomologist specialising in Lepidoptera.

Ottmar Hofmann was a physician. As an entomologist, he worked on Microlepidoptera. His collection was sold to Thomas de Grey, 6th Baron Walsingham and is now in the Natural History Museum (London).
