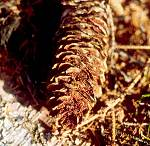
- Pucciniastrum areolatum

Scientific classification
- Kingdom: Fungi
- Division: Basidiomycota
- Class: Pucciniomycetes
- Order: Pucciniales
- Family: Pucciniastraceae; Jülich

Type genus
- Pucciniastrum G.H. Otth

= Pucciniastraceae =

Family of fungi

The Pucciniastraceae are a family of rust fungi in the order Pucciniales. The family contains 11 genera and 158 species.

== Genera ==
- Allodus
- Calyptospora
- Hyalopsora
- Melampsorella
- Melampsoridium
- Milesia
- Milesina
- Naohidemyces
- Peridiopsora
- Pucciniastrum
- Thekopsora
- Uredinopsis
