= List of Lepidoptera of Malta =

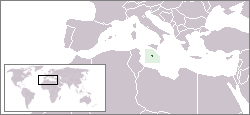
Location of Malta

The Lepidoptera of Malta consist of both the butterflies and moths recorded from the island of Malta.

== Butterflies ==
=== Hesperiidae ===
- Gegenes pumilio (Hoffmannsegg, 1804)

=== Lycaenidae ===
- Aricia agestis (Denis & Schiffermuller, 1775)
- Callophrys rubi (Linnaeus, 1758)
- Celastrina argiolus (Linnaeus, 1758)
- Lampides boeticus (Linnaeus, 1767)
- Leptotes pirithous (Linnaeus, 1767)
- Lycaena phlaeas (Linnaeus, 1761)
- Lysandra bellargus (Rottemburg, 1775)
- Plebejus argus (Linnaeus, 1758)
- Polyommatus icarus (Rottemburg, 1775)
- Zizeeria knysna (Trimen, 1862)

=== Nymphalidae ===
- Aglais io (Linnaeus, 1758)
- Aglais urticae (Linnaeus, 1758)
- Boloria dia (Linnaeus, 1767)
- Coenonympha pamphilus (Linnaeus, 1758)
- Danaus chrysippus (Linnaeus, 1758)
- Hipparchia blachieri (Fruhstorfer, 1908)
- Lasiommata maera (Linnaeus, 1758)
- Lasiommata megera (Linnaeus, 1767)
- Maniola jurtina (Linnaeus, 1758)
- Melitaea cinxia (Linnaeus, 1758)
- Melitaea didyma (Esper, 1778)
- Nymphalis polychloros (Linnaeus, 1758)
- Pararge aegeria (Linnaeus, 1758)
- Polygonia c-album (Linnaeus, 1758)
- Polygonia egea (Cramer, 1775)
- Pyronia tithonus (Linnaeus, 1767)
- Vanessa atalanta (Linnaeus, 1758)
- Vanessa cardui (Linnaeus, 1758)

=== Papilionidae ===
- Iphiclides podalirius (Linnaeus, 1758)
  - Iphiclides podalirius podalirius (Linnaeus, 1758)
- Papilio machaon Linnaeus, 1758

=== Pieridae ===
- Aporia crataegi (Linnaeus, 1758)
- Colias croceus (Fourcroy, 1785)
- Colias hyale (Linnaeus, 1758)
- Euchloe belemia (Esper, 1800)
- Gonepteryx cleopatra (Linnaeus, 1767)
- Gonepteryx rhamni (Linnaeus, 1758)
- Leptidea sinapis (Linnaeus, 1758)
- Pieris brassicae (Linnaeus, 1758)
- Pieris napi (Linnaeus, 1758)
- Pieris rapae (Linnaeus, 1758)

== Moths ==
=== Adelidae ===
- Nemophora raddaella (Hübner, 1793)

=== Alucitidae ===
- Alucita grammodactyla Zeller, 1841
- Alucita hexadactyla Linnaeus, 1758

=== Autostichidae ===
- Apatema mediopallidum Walsingham, 1900
- Dysspastus lilliput Gozmany, 1996
- Holcopogon bubulcellus (Staudinger, 1859)
  - Holcopogon bubulcellus bubulcellus (Staudinger, 1859)
- Oecia oecophila (Staudinger, 1876)
- Oegoconia deauratella (Herrich-Schäffer, 1854)
- Oegoconia deluccai Amsel, 1952
- Pantacordis pallida (Staudinger, 1876)
- Symmoca signatella Herrich-Schäffer, 1854

=== Batrachedridae ===
- Batrachedra parvulipunctella Chretien, 1915

=== Bedelliidae ===
- Bedellia somnulentella (Zeller, 1847)

=== Blastobasidae ===
- Blastobasis phycidella (Zeller, 1839)

=== Choreutidae ===
- Choreutis nemorana (Hübner, 1799)
- Tebenna bjerkandrella (Thunberg, 1784)

=== Coleophoridae ===
- Coleophora binotapennella (Duponchel, 1843)
- Coleophora calycotomella Stainton, 1869
- Coleophora conyzae Zeller, 1868
- Coleophora crepidinella Zeller, 1847
- Coleophora jefreniensis Toll, 1954
- Coleophora luteolella Staudinger, 1880
- Coleophora pyrrhulipennella Zeller, 1839
- Coleophora semicinerea Staudinger, 1859
- Coleophora versurella Zeller, 1849
- Goniodoma limoniella (Stainton, 1884)

=== Cosmopterigidae ===
- Anatrachyntis badia (Hodges, 1962)
- Ascalenia acaciella Chretien, 1915
- Ascalenia echidnias (Meyrick, 1891)
- Bifascioides leucomelanella (Rebel, 1916)
- Coccidiphila gerasimovi Danilevsky, 1950
- Coccidiphila ledereriella (Zeller, 1850)
- Cosmopterix coryphaea Walsingham, 1908
- Cosmopterix pulchrimella Chambers, 1875
- Eteobalea intermediella (Riedl, 1966)
- Eteobalea serratella (Treitschke, 1833)
- Gisilia stereodoxa (Meyrick, 1925)
- Pyroderces argyrogrammos (Zeller, 1847)
- Pyroderces wolschrijni Koster & Sinev, 2003

=== Cossidae ===
- Zeuzera pyrina pyrina (Linnaeus, 1761)
- Zeuzera pyrina (Linnaeus, 1761)

=== Crambidae ===
- Achyra nudalis (Hübner, 1796)
- Agriphila trabeatellus (Herrich-Schäffer, 1848)
- Anania crocealis (Hübner, 1796)
- Anania hortulata (Linnaeus, 1758)
- Anania lancealis (Denis & Schiffermuller, 1775)
- Anania testacealis (Zeller, 1847)
- Ancylolomia inornata Staudinger, 1870
- Ancylolomia pectinatellus (Zeller, 1847)
- Ancylolomia tentaculella (Hübner, 1796)
- Ancylolomia tripolitella Rebel, 1909
- Antigastra catalaunalis (Duponchel, 1833)
- Aporodes floralis (Hübner, 1809)
- Arnia nervosalis Guenee, 1849
- Cataonia erubescens (Christoph, 1877)
- Cornifrons ulceratalis Lederer, 1858
- Cynaeda dentalis (Denis & Schiffermuller, 1775)
- Diasemiopsis ramburialis (Duponchel, 1834)
- Dolicharthria bruguieralis (Duponchel, 1833)
- Duponchelia fovealis Zeller, 1847
- Euchromius cambridgei (Zeller, 1867)
- Euchromius ocellea (Haworth, 1811)
- Euclasta varii Popescu-Gorj & Constantinescu, 1973
- Eudonia angustea (Curtis, 1827)
- Evergestis desertalis (Hübner, 1813)
- Evergestis isatidalis (Duponchel, 1833)
- Hellula undalis (Fabricius, 1781)
- Hodebertia testalis (Fabricius, 1794)
- Hydriris ornatalis (Duponchel, 1832)
- Hyperlais nemausalis (Duponchel, 1834)
- Loxostege sticticalis (Linnaeus, 1761)
- Mecyna asinalis (Hübner, 1819)
- Metacrambus carectellus (Zeller, 1847)
- Metasia corsicalis (Duponchel, 1833)
- Nomophila noctuella (Denis & Schiffermuller, 1775)
- Nymphula nitidulata (Hufnagel, 1767)
- Ostrinia nubilalis (Hübner, 1796)
- Palepicorsia ustrinalis (Christoph, 1877)
- Palpita vitrealis (Rossi, 1794)
- Paracorsia repandalis (Denis & Schiffermuller, 1775)
- Pediasia siculellus (Duponchel, 1836)
- Pleuroptya ruralis (Scopoli, 1763)
- Pyrausta despicata (Scopoli, 1763)
- Pyrausta sanguinalis (Linnaeus, 1767)
- Spoladea recurvalis (Fabricius, 1775)
- Tegostoma comparalis (Hübner, 1796)
- Udea ferrugalis (Hübner, 1796)
- Udea lutealis (Hübner, 1809)
- Uresiphita gilvata (Fabricius, 1794)

=== Elachistidae ===
- Agonopterix adspersella (Kollar, 1832)
- Agonopterix assimilella (Treitschke, 1832)
- Agonopterix propinquella (Treitschke, 1835)
- Agonopterix rutana (Fabricius, 1794)
- Agonopterix subpropinquella (Stainton, 1849)
- Agonopterix thapsiella (Zeller, 1847)
- Agonopterix vendettella (Chretien, 1908)
- Agonopterix yeatiana (Fabricius, 1781)
- Depressaria depressana (Fabricius, 1775)
- Depressaria marcella Rebel, 1901
- Depressaria veneficella Zeller, 1847
- Ethmia bipunctella (Fabricius, 1775)

=== Erebidae ===
- Anumeta cestis (Menetries, 1848)
- Anumeta hilgerti (Rothschild, 1909)
- Araeopteron ecphaea Hampson, 1914
- Autophila dilucida (Hübner, 1808)
- Autophila rosea (Staudinger, 1888)
- Autophila maura (Staudinger, 1888)
- Casama innotata (Walker, 1855)
- Catocala coniuncta (Esper, 1787)
- Catocala elocata (Esper, 1787)
- Catocala nymphaea (Esper, 1787)
- Catocala nymphagoga (Esper, 1787)
- Cerocala algiriae Oberthur, 1876
- Clytie illunaris (Hübner, 1813)
- Coscinia striata (Linnaeus, 1758)
- Cymbalophora pudica (Esper, 1785)
- Dysauxes famula (Freyer, 1836)
- Dysgonia algira (Linnaeus, 1767)
- Dysgonia torrida (Guenee, 1852)
- Eilema caniola (Hübner, 1808)
- Eilema pygmaeola (Doubleday, 1847)
- Eublemma cochylioides (Guenee, 1852)
- Eublemma deleta (Staudinger, 1901)
- Eublemma deserta (Rothschild, 1909)
- Eublemma ostrina (Hübner, 1808)
- Eublemma parva (Hübner, 1808)
- Eublemma scitula Rambur, 1833
- Euproctis chrysorrhoea (Linnaeus, 1758)
- Grammodes bifasciata (Petagna, 1787)
- Grammodes stolida (Fabricius, 1775)
- Heteropalpia acrosticta (Puneler, 1904)
- Hypena lividalis (Hübner, 1796)
- Hypena obsitalis (Hübner, 1813)
- Hypena proboscidalis (Linnaeus, 1758)
- Lithosia quadra (Linnaeus, 1758)
- Lymantria atlantica (Rambur, 1837)
- Metachrostis velocior (Staudinger, 1892)
- Metachrostis velox (Hübner, 1813)
- Minucia lunaris (Denis & Schiffermuller, 1775)
- Nodaria nodosalis (Herrich-Schäffer, 1851)
- Odice suava (Hübner, 1813)
- Ophiusa tirhaca (Cramer, 1773)
- Orgyia trigotephras Boisduval, 1829
- Pandesma robusta (Walker, 1858)
- Pechipogo plumigeralis Hübner, 1825
- Phragmatobia fuliginosa (Linnaeus, 1758)
- Schrankia costaestrigalis (Stephens, 1834)
- Tathorhynchus exsiccata (Lederer, 1855)
- Utetheisa pulchella (Linnaeus, 1758)
- Zebeeba falsalis (Herrich-Schäffer, 1839)

=== Eriocottidae ===
- Eriocottis fuscanella Zeller, 1847

=== Euteliidae ===
- Eutelia adulatrix (Hübner, 1813)

=== Gelechiidae ===
- Anarsia lineatella Zeller, 1839
- Apodia bifractella (Duponchel, 1843)
- Aproaerema anthyllidella (Hübner, 1813)
  - Aproaerema anthyllidella anthylidella (Hübner, 1813)
- Crossobela trinotella (Herrich-Schäffer, 1856)
- Dichomeris acuminatus (Staudinger, 1876)
- Dichomeris lamprostoma (Zeller, 1847)
- Ephysteris iberica Povolny, 1977
- Ephysteris promptella (Staudinger, 1859)
- Epidola melitensis Amsel, 1955
- Eulamprotes nigritella (Zeller, 1847)
- Isophrictis kefersteiniellus (Zeller, 1850)
- Megacraspedus lativalvellus Amsel, 1954
- Mesophleps ochracella (Turati, 1926)
- Metzneria aestivella aestivella (Zeller, 1839)
- Metzneria aestivella (Zeller, 1839)
- Metzneria castiliella (Moschler, 1866)
- Metzneria torosulella (Rebel, 1893)
- Mirificarma eburnella (Denis & Schiffermuller, 1775)
- Ochrodia subdiminutella (Stainton, 1867)
- Ornativalva heluanensis (Debski, 1913)
- Ornativalva plutelliformis (Staudinger, 1859)
- Palumbina guerinii (Stainton, 1858)
- Pectinophora gossypiella (Saunders, 1844)
- Phthorimaea operculella (Zeller, 1873)
- Platyedra subcinerea (Haworth, 1828)
- Pseudotelphusa paripunctella (Thunberg, 1794)
- Ptocheuusa paupella (Zeller, 1847)
- Recurvaria nanella (Denis & Schiffermuller, 1775)
- Scrobipalpa ergasima (Meyrick, 1916)
- Scrobipalpa halymella (Milliere, 1864)
- Scrobipalpa obsoletella (Fischer von Röslerstamm, 1841)
- Scrobipalpa ocellatella (Boyd, 1858)
- Scrobipalpa portosanctana (Stainton, 1859)
- Scrobipalpa traganella (Chretien, 1915)
- Scrobipalpa vicaria (Meyrick, 1921)
- Sitotroga cerealella (Olivier, 1789)
- Stomopteryx basalis (Staudinger, 1876)
- Syncopacma polychromella (Rebel, 1902)
- Tuta absoluta (Meyrick, 1917)

=== Geometridae ===
- Aplocera efformata (Guenee, 1858)
- Apochima flabellaria (Heeger, 1838)
- Ascotis selenaria (Denis & Schiffermuller, 1775)
- Aspitates ochrearia (Rossi, 1794)
- Camptogramma bilineata (Linnaeus, 1758)
- Catarhoe basochesiata (Duponchel, 1831)
- Charissa mucidaria (Hübner, 1799)
- Charissa variegata (Duponchel, 1830)
- Chiasmia aestimaria (Hübner, 1809)
- Coenotephria ablutaria (Boisduval, 1840)
- Cyclophora puppillaria (Hübner, 1799)
- Eucrostes indigenata (de Villers, 1789)
- Eupithecia breviculata (Donzel, 1837)
- Eupithecia centaureata (Denis & Schiffermuller, 1775)
- Eupithecia innotata (Hufnagel, 1767)
- Eupithecia oxycedrata (Rambur, 1833)
- Eupithecia phoeniceata (Rambur, 1834)
- Eupithecia semigraphata Bruand, 1850
- Eupithecia ultimaria Boisduval, 1840
- Eupithecia venosata (Fabricius, 1787)
- Gymnoscelis rufifasciata (Haworth, 1809)
- Horisme exoletata (Herrich-Schäffer, 1838)
- Idaea degeneraria (Hübner, 1799)
- Idaea determinata (Staudinger, 1876)
- Idaea distinctaria (Boisduval, 1840)
- Idaea elongaria (Rambur, 1833)
- Idaea fractilineata (Zeller, 1847)
- Idaea infirmaria (Rambur, 1833)
- Idaea inquinata (Scopoli, 1763)
- Idaea laevigata (Scopoli, 1763)
- Idaea longaria (Herrich-Schäffer, 1852)
- Idaea manicaria (Herrich-Schäffer, 1852)
- Idaea obsoletaria (Rambur, 1833)
- Idaea ochrata (Scopoli, 1763)
- Idaea rainerii Hausmann, 1994
- Idaea rusticata (Denis & Schiffermuller, 1775)
- Idaea seriata (Schrank, 1802)
- Isturgia arenacearia (Denis & Schiffermuller, 1775)
- Isturgia disputaria (Guenee, 1858)
- Isturgia spodiaria (Lefebvre, 1832)
- Larentia clavaria (Haworth, 1809)
- Larentia malvata (Rambur, 1833)
- Lithostege fissurata Mabille, 1888
- Menophra japygiaria (O. Costa, 1849)
- Nycterosea obstipata (Fabricius, 1794)
- Phaiogramma etruscaria (Zeller, 1849)
- Phaiogramma faustinata (Milliere, 1868)
- Rhodometra sacraria (Linnaeus, 1767)
- Scopula asellaria (Herrich-Schäffer, 1847)
- Scopula decolor (Staudinger, 1898)
- Scopula emutaria (Hübner, 1809)
- Scopula imitaria (Hübner, 1799)
- Scopula marginepunctata (Goeze, 1781)
- Scopula minorata (Boisduval, 1833)
- Scopula ornata (Scopoli, 1763)
- Scopula vigilata (Sohn-Rethel, 1929)
- Scotopteryx chenopodiata (Linnaeus, 1758)
- Thera cupressata (Geyer, 1831)
- Xanthorhoe disjunctaria (de La Harpe, 1860)

=== Glyphipterigidae ===
- Glyphipterix equitella (Scopoli, 1763)
  - Glyphipterix equitella equitella (Scopoli, 1763)
- Glyphipterix simpliciella (Stephens, 1834)

=== Gracillariidae ===
- Caloptilia coruscans (Walsingham, 1907)
- Dialectica scalariella (Zeller, 1850)
- Phyllocnistis citrella Stainton, 1856

=== Heliozelidae ===
- Holocacista rivillei (Stainton, 1855)

=== Lasiocampidae ===
- Gastropacha quercifolia (Linnaeus, 1758)
  - Gastropacha quercifolia quercifolia (Linnaeus, 1758)
- Lasiocampa quercus (Linnaeus, 1758)
  - Lasiocampa quercus quercus (Linnaeus, 1758)
- Lasiocampa trifolii (Denis & Schiffermuller, 1775)
  - Lasiocampa trifolii trifolii (Denis & Schiffermuller, 1775)
- Malacosoma neustria (Linnaeus, 1758)
  - Malacosoma neustria neustria (Linnaeus, 1758)

=== Momphidae ===
- Mompha subbistrigella (Haworth, 1828)

=== Nepticulidae ===
- Stigmella aurella (Fabricius, 1775)

=== Noctuidae ===
- Abrostola asclepiadis (Denis & Schiffermuller, 1775)
- Abrostola triplasia (Linnaeus, 1758)
- Acontia lucida (Hufnagel, 1766)
- Acontia trabealis (Scopoli, 1763)
- Aedia leucomelas (Linnaeus, 1758)
- Aegle semicana (Esper, 1798)
- Agrochola lychnidis (Denis & Schiffermuller, 1775)
  - Agrochola lychnidis lychnidis (Denis & Schiffermuller, 1775)
- Agrotis catalaunensis (Milliere, 1873)
  - Agrotis catalaunensis catalaunensis (Milliere, 1873)
- Agrotis haifae Staudinger, 1897
- Agrotis herzogi Rebel, 1911
- Agrotis ipsilon (Hufnagel, 1766)
- Agrotis lasserrei (Oberthur, 1881)
- Agrotis lata Treitschke, 1835
- Agrotis puta (Hübner, 1803)
- Agrotis segetum (Denis & Schiffermuller, 1775)
- Agrotis spinifera (Hübner, 1808)
- Agrotis trux (Hübner, 1824)
- Amphipyra tragopoginis (Clerck, 1759)
- Anarta deserticola (Hampson, 1905)
- Anarta trifolii (Hufnagel, 1766)
- Anarta sabulorum (Alpheraky, 1892)
  - Anarta sabulorum pulverata (A. Bang-Haas, 1907)
- Aporophyla canescens (Duponchel, 1826)
- Aporophyla chioleuca (Herrich-Schäffer, 1850)
  - Aporophyla chioleuca sammuti Fibiger, Yela, Zilli & Ronkay, 2010
- Aporophyla nigra (Haworth, 1809)
  - Aporophyla nigra cinerea Staudinger, 1901
- Athetis hospes (Freyer, 1831)
- Autographa gamma (Linnaeus, 1758)
- Brithys crini (Fabricius, 1775)
- Bryophila raptricula (Denis & Schiffermuller, 1775)
- Callopistria latreillei (Duponchel, 1827)
- Calophasia platyptera (Esper, 1788)
- Caradrina germainii (Duponchel, 1835)
- Caradrina flava Oberthur, 1876
- Caradrina vicina Staudinger, 1870
  - Caradrina vicina castrensis Berio, 1981
- Caradrina clavipalpis Scopoli, 1763
- Caradrina flavirena Guenee, 1852
- Caradrina selini Boisduval, 1840
  - Caradrina selini djebli Rungs, 1972
- Caradrina proxima Rambur, 1837
- Cerastis faceta (Treitschke, 1835)
- Chloantha hyperici (Denis & Schiffermuller, 1775)
- Chrysodeixis chalcites (Esper, 1789)
- Cleonymia chabordis (Oberthur, 1876)
- Condica viscosa (Freyer, 1831)
- Conisania luteago (Denis & Schiffermuller, 1775)
  - Conisania luteago luteago (Denis & Schiffermuller, 1775)
- Cornutiplusia circumflexa (Linnaeus, 1767)
- Cryphia algae (Fabricius, 1775)
- Cryphia pallida (Baker, 1894)
- Ctenoplusia accentifera (Lefebvre, 1827)
- Cucullia biskrana Oberthur, 1918
- Cucullia calendulae Treitschke, 1835
- Cucullia chamomillae (Denis & Schiffermuller, 1775)
- Cucullia syrtana Mabille, 1888
- Cucullia lychnitis Rambur, 1833
- Cucullia verbasci (Linnaeus, 1758)
- Denticucullus pygmina (Haworth, 1809)
- Diloba caeruleocephala (Linnaeus, 1758)
- Dryobotodes tenebrosa (Esper, 1789)
- Episema grueneri Boisduval, 1837
- Eremohadena roseonitens (Oberthur, 1887)
- Euxoa canariensis Rebel, 1902
  - Euxoa canariensis mauretanica (A. Bang-Haas, 1910)
- Euxoa distinguenda (Lederer, 1857)
- Gortyna xanthenes Germar, 1842
- Hadena sancta (Staudinger, 1859)
  - Hadena sancta sancta (Staudinger, 1859)
- Hadena capsincola (Denis & Schiffermuller, 1775)
- Hecatera cappa (Hübner, 1809)
- Hecatera weissi (Draudt, 1934)
- Helicoverpa armigera (Hübner, 1808)
- Heliothis nubigera Herrich-Schäffer, 1851
- Heliothis peltigera (Denis & Schiffermuller, 1775)
- Hoplodrina ambigua (Denis & Schiffermuller, 1775)
- Lacanobia blenna (Hübner, 1824)
- Lacanobia oleracea (Linnaeus, 1758)
- Leucania loreyi (Duponchel, 1827)
- Leucania punctosa (Treitschke, 1825)
- Leucania putrescens (Hübner, 1824)
  - Leucania putrescens vallettai Boursin, 1952
- Leucania zeae (Duponchel, 1827)
- Luperina dumerilii (Duponchel, 1826)
  - Luperina dumerilii dumerilli (Duponchel, 1826)
- Mamestra brassicae (Linnaeus, 1758)
- Melanchra persicariae (Linnaeus, 1761)
  - Melanchra persicariae persicariae (Linnaeus, 1761)
- Mniotype deluccai (Berio, 1976)
- Mormo maura (Linnaeus, 1758)
- Mythimna albipuncta (Denis & Schiffermuller, 1775)
- Mythimna l-album (Linnaeus, 1767)
- Mythimna languida (Walker, 1858)
- Mythimna vitellina (Hübner, 1808)
- Mythimna prominens (Walker, 1856)
- Mythimna unipuncta (Haworth, 1809)
- Mythimna sicula (Treitschke, 1835)
- Noctua comes Hübner, 1813
- Noctua janthe (Borkhausen, 1792)
- Noctua pronuba (Linnaeus, 1758)
- Noctua tirrenica Biebinger, Speidel & Hanigk, 1983
- Nonagria typhae (Thunberg, 1784)
- Nyctobrya muralis (Forster, 1771)
- Nyctobrya segunai Fibiger, Steiner, & Ronkay, 2009
- Ochropleura leucogaster (Freyer, 1831)
- Oria musculosa (Hübner, 1808)
- Peridroma saucia (Hübner, 1808)
- Phlogophora meticulosa (Linnaeus, 1758)
- Protoschinia scutosa (Denis & Schiffermuller, 1775)
- Pseudozarba bipartita (Herrich-Schäffer, 1850)
- Rhabinopteryx subtilis (Mabille, 1888)
- Scythocentropus inquinata (Mabille, 1888)
- Sesamia cretica Lederer, 1857
- Sesamia nonagrioides Lefebvre, 1827
- Spodoptera cilium Guenee, 1852
- Spodoptera exigua (Hübner, 1808)
- Spodoptera littoralis (Boisduval, 1833)
- Synthymia fixa (Fabricius, 1787)
- Thalpophila vitalba (Freyer, 1834)
- Thysanoplusia circumscripta (Freyer, 1831)
- Thysanoplusia daubei (Boisduval, 1840)
- Thysanoplusia orichalcea (Fabricius, 1775)
- Trichoplusia ni (Hübner, 1803)
- Tyta luctuosa (Denis & Schiffermuller, 1775)
- Valeria oleagina (Denis & Schiffermuller, 1775)
- Xanthia ruticilla (Esper, 1791)
- Xanthodes albago (Fabricius, 1794)
- Xestia c-nigrum (Linnaeus, 1758)
- Xestia xanthographa (Denis & Schiffermuller, 1775)
- Xylena solidaginis (Hübner, 1803)
- Xylena exsoleta (Linnaeus, 1758)
  - Xylena exsoleta exsoleta (Linnaeus, 1758)
  - Xylena exsoleta maltensis Fibiger, Sammut, Seguna & Catania, 2006

=== Nolidae ===
- Earias clorana (Linnaeus, 1761)
- Earias insulana (Boisduval, 1833)
- Garella nilotica (Rogenhofer, 1882)
- Nola cristatula (Hübner, 1793)

=== Oecophoridae ===
- Batia lunaris (Haworth, 1828)
- Epicallima formosella (Denis & Schiffermuller, 1775)
- Esperia sulphurella (Fabricius, 1775)

=== Plutellidae ===
- Plutella xylostella (Linnaeus, 1758)

=== Praydidae ===
- Prays citri (Milliere, 1873)
- Prays oleae (Bernard, 1788)

=== Psychidae ===
- Apterona helicinella (Herrich-Schäffer, 1846)
- Oiketicoides tedaldii (Heylaerts, 1881)
- Pachythelia villosella (Ochsenheimer, 1810)
- Penestoglossa dardoinella (Milliere, 1863)
- Phalacropterix apiformis (Rossi, 1790)
- Sciopetris melitensis Rebel, 1919

=== Pterolonchidae ===
- Pterolonche pulverulenta Zeller, 1847
- Pterolonche albescens Zeller, 1847
- Pterolonche vallettae Amsel, 1955

=== Pterophoridae ===
- Adaina microdactyla (Hübner, 1813)
- Agdistis frankeniae (Zeller, 1847)
- Agdistis melitensis Amsel, 1954
- Agdistis meridionalis (Zeller, 1847)
- Agdistis satanas Milliere, 1875
- Agdistis symmetrica Amsel, 1955
- Agdistis tamaricis (Zeller, 1847)
- Amblyptilia acanthadactyla (Hübner, 1813)
- Capperia hellenica Adamczewski, 1951
- Crombrugghia laetus (Zeller, 1847)
- Emmelina monodactyla (Linnaeus, 1758)
- Hellinsia carphodactyla (Hübner, 1813)
- Hellinsia inulae (Zeller, 1852)
- Merrifieldia malacodactylus (Zeller, 1847)
- Merrifieldia tridactyla (Linnaeus, 1758)
- Porrittia galactodactyla (Denis & Schiffermuller, 1775)
- Pterophorus ischnodactyla (Treitschke, 1835)
- Puerphorus olbiadactylus (Milliere, 1859)
- Stenoptilia bipunctidactyla (Scopoli, 1763)
- Stenoptilia pterodactyla (Linnaeus, 1761)
- Stenoptilia zophodactylus (Duponchel, 1840)
- Stenoptilodes taprobanes (Felder & Rogenhofer, 1875)

=== Pyralidae ===
- Achroia grisella (Fabricius, 1794)
- Acrobasis obtusella (Hübner, 1796)
- Aglossa caprealis (Hübner, 1809)
- Aglossa pinguinalis (Linnaeus, 1758)
- Alophia combustella (Herrich-Schäffer, 1855)
- Ancylodes pallens Ragonot, 1887
- Ancylosis convexella (Lederer, 1855)
- Ancylosis faustinella (Zeller, 1867)
- Ancylosis gracilella Ragonot, 1887
- Ancylosis harmoniella (Ragonot, 1887)
- Ancylosis nigripunctella (Staudinger, 1879)
- Ancylosis oblitella (Zeller, 1848)
- Ancylosis ochracea (Staudinger, 1870)
- Ancylosis partitella (Ragonot, 1887)
- Anerastia lotella (Hübner, 1813)
- Apomyelois ceratoniae (Zeller, 1839)
- Bostra obsoletalis (Mann, 1884)
- Bradyrrhoa cantenerella (Duponchel, 1837)
- Bradyrrhoa confiniella Zeller, 1848
- Cadra abstersella (Zeller, 1847)
- Cadra calidella (Guenee, 1845)
- Cadra cautella (Walker, 1863)
- Cadra figulilella (Gregson, 1871)
- Cathayia insularum (Speidel & Schmitz, 1991)
- Ceutholopha isidis (Zeller, 1867)
- Corcyra cephalonica (Stainton, 1866)
- Cryptoblabes gnidiella (Milliere, 1867)
- Delplanqueia dilutella (Denis & Schiffermuller, 1775)
- Denticera divisella (Duponchel, 1842)
- Dioryctria mendacella (Staudinger, 1859)
- Dioryctria pineae (Staudinger, 1859)
- Dioryctria sylvestrella (Ratzeburg, 1840)
- Ematheudes punctella (Treitschke, 1833)
- Endotricha flammealis (Denis & Schiffermuller, 1775)
- Ephestia elutella (Hübner, 1796)
- Ephestia kuehniella Zeller, 1879
- Ephestia unicolorella Staudinger, 1881
  - Ephestia unicolorella woodiella Richards & Thomson, 1932
- Ephestia welseriella (Zeller, 1848)
- Epischnia asteris Staudinger, 1870
- Epischnia illotella Zeller, 1839
- Etiella zinckenella (Treitschke, 1832)
- Euzophera bigella (Zeller, 1848)
- Euzophera lunulella (O. Costa, 1836)
- Euzophera subcribrella Ragonot, 1887
- Euzopherodes vapidella (Mann, 1857)
- Faveria dionysia (Zeller, 1846)
- Galleria mellonella (Linnaeus, 1758)
- Gymnancyla canella (Denis & Schiffermuller, 1775)
- Homoeosoma nimbella (Duponchel, 1837)
- Homoeosoma sinuella (Fabricius, 1794)
- Hypotia corticalis (Denis & Schiffermuller, 1775)
- Hypotia infulalis Lederer, 1858
- Hypotia pectinalis (Herrich-Schäffer, 1838)
- Hypsopygia glaucinalis (Linnaeus, 1758)
- Hypsotropa vulneratella (Zeller, 1847)
- Khorassania compositella (Treitschke, 1835)
- Lamoria anella (Denis & Schiffermuller, 1775)
- Loryma egregialis (Herrich-Schäffer, 1838)
- Maradana fuscolimbalis (Ragonot, 1888)
- Metallostichodes nigrocyanella (Constant, 1865)
- Moitrelia hispanella Staudinger, 1859
- Moitrelia italogallicella (Milliere, 1882)
- Myelois circumvoluta (Fourcroy, 1785)
- Neurotomia coenulentella (Zeller, 1846)
- Nyctegretis ruminella La Harpe, 1860
- Oxybia transversella (Duponchel, 1836)
- Pempelia brephiella (Staudinger, 1879)
- Pempeliella sororiella Zeller, 1839
- Phycita diaphana (Staudinger, 1870)
- Phycita roborella (Denis & Schiffermuller, 1775)
- Phycitodes binaevella (Hübner, 1813)
- Phycitodes inquinatella (Ragonot, 1887)
- Phycitodes lacteella (Rothschild, 1915)
- Phycitodes saxicola (Vaughan, 1870)
- Plodia interpunctella (Hübner, 1813)
- Postemmalocera palaearctella (Turati, 1917)
- Pterothrixidia rufella (Duponchel, 1836)
- Pyralis farinalis (Linnaeus, 1758)
- Stemmatophora brunnealis (Treitschke, 1829)
- Synaphe punctalis (Fabricius, 1775)

=== Sesiidae ===
- Bembecia tunetana (Le Cerf, 1920)
- Chamaesphecia aerifrons (Zeller, 1847)
  - Chamaesphecia aerifrons aerifrons (Zeller, 1847)
- Chamaesphecia anthraciformis (Rambur, 1832)
- Synanthedon myopaeformis (Borkhausen, 1789)
  - Synanthedon myopaeformis cruentata (Mann, 1859)

=== Sphingidae ===
- Acherontia atropos (Linnaeus, 1758)
- Agrius convolvuli (Linnaeus, 1758)
- Daphnis nerii (Linnaeus, 1758)
- Hippotion celerio (Linnaeus, 1758)
- Hyles livornica (Esper, 1780)
- Hyles sammuti Eitschberger, Danner & Surholt, 1998
- Macroglossum stellatarum (Linnaeus, 1758)

=== Stathmopodidae ===
- Neomariania partinicensis (Rebel, 1937)

=== Tineidae ===
- Ateliotum insulare (Rebel, 1896)
- Ceratuncus danubiella (Mann, 1866)
- Monopis obviella (Denis & Schiffermuller, 1775)
- Praeacedes atomosella (Walker, 1863)
- Reisserita mauretanica (Baker, 1885)
- Rhodobates unicolor (Staudinger, 1870)
- Trichophaga bipartitella (Ragonot, 1892)

=== Tischeriidae ===
- Coptotriche angusticollella (Duponchel, 1843)

=== Tortricidae ===
- Acleris variegana (Denis & Schiffermuller, 1775)
- Acroclita subsequana (Herrich-Schäffer, 1851)
- Aethes bilbaensis (Rossler, 1877)
- Aethes deaurana (Peyerimhoff, 1877)
- Aethes francillana (Fabricius, 1794)
- Aphelia peramplana (Hübner, 1825)
- Aphelia unitana (Hübner, [1796-99])
- Archips rosana (Linnaeus, 1758)
- Avaria hyerana (Milliere, 1858)
- Bactra furfurana (Haworth, 1811)
- Bactra lancealana (Hübner, 1799)
- Bactra robustana (Christoph, 1872)
- Bactra venosana (Zeller, 1847)
- Cacoecimorpha pronubana (Hübner, 1799)
- Clepsis consimilana (Hübner, 1817)
- Clepsis neglectana (Herrich-Schäffer, 1851)
- Clepsis spectrana (Treitschke, 1830)
- Clepsis unicolorana (Duponchel, 1835)
- Cnephasia bizensis Real, 1953
- Cnephasia gueneeana (Duponchel, 1836)
- Cnephasia longana (Haworth, 1811)
- Cnephasia orientana (Alpheraky, 1876)
- Cochylidia heydeniana (Herrich-Schäffer, 1851)
- Cochylimorpha decolorella (Zeller, 1839)
- Cochylimorpha straminea (Haworth, 1811)
- Cochylis molliculana Zeller, 1847
- Cochylis moguntiana (Rössler, 1864)
- Crocidosema plebejana Zeller, 1847
- Cydia aldocataniae (Trematerra and Catania), 2019https://lepiforum.org/wiki/page/Cydia_aldocataniae
- Cydia rymarczki (Varenne & Nel), 2013
- Cydia fagiglandana (Zeller, 1841)
- Cydia pomonella (Linnaeus, 1758)
- Cydia sammuti Diakonoff, 1986
- Cydia succedana (Denis & Schiffermuller, 1775)
- Cydia ulicetana (Haworth, [1811])
- Enarmonia formosana (Scopoli, 1763)
- Endothenia marginana (Haworth, 1811)
- Epinotia thapsiana (Zeller, 1847)
- Eucosma cana (Haworth, 1811)
- Eucosma fulvana (Stephens, 1834)
- Fulvoclysia nerminae Koçak, 1982
- Grapholita molesta (Busck, 1916)
- Grapholita compositella (Fabricius, 1775)
- Grapholita lunulana (Denis & Schiffermuller, 1775)
- Gypsonoma dealbana (Frolich, 1828)
- Hedya dimidiana (Clerck, 1759)
- Lobesia botrana (Denis & Schiffermuller, 1775)
- Lobesia indusiana (Zeller, 1847)
- Lobesia limoniana (Millière, 1860)
- Lobesia porrectana (Zeller, 1847)
- Pammene fasciana (Linnaeus, 1761)
- Pelochrista hepatariana (Herrich-Schäffer, 1851)
- Pelochrista mollitana (Zeller, 1847)
- Phalonidia contractana (Zeller, 1847)
- Phtheochroa duponchelana (Duponchel, 1843)
- Phtheochroa ochralana (Chretien, 1915)
- Phtheochroa rectangulana (Chretien, 1915)
- Pseudococcyx tessulatana (Staudinger, 1871)
- Rhyacionia buoliana (Denis & Schiffermuller, 1775)
- Selania capparidana (Zeller, 1847)
- Selania leplastriana (Curtis, 1831)
- Spilonota ocellana (Denis & Schiffermuller, 1775)

=== Yponomeutidae ===
- Yponomeuta evonymella (Linnaeus, 1758)
- Yponomeuta padella (Linnaeus, 1758)
- Zelleria oleastrella (Milliere, 1864)
