= Catocala distorta =

Scientific classification
- Kingdom: Animalia
- Phylum: Arthropoda
- Class: Insecta
- Order: Lepidoptera
- Superfamily: Noctuoidea
- Family: Erebidae
- Genus: Catocala
- Species: C. distorta

Binomial name
- Catocala distorta Butler, 1889

Species of moth

Catocala distorta is a moth in the family Erebidae. It was described by Arthur Gardiner Butler in 1889. It is found in Himachal Pradesh, India. The species is 52 millimetres (2.0 in) long and is different from Catocala nymphaea by being more brown and having much duller thorax and forewing.
