= Epidola semitica =

Scientific classification
- Domain: Eukaryota
- Kingdom: Animalia
- Phylum: Arthropoda
- Class: Insecta
- Order: Lepidoptera
- Family: Gelechiidae
- Genus: Epidola
- Species: E. semitica

Binomial name
- Epidola semitica Amsel, 1942

Species of moth

Epidola semitica is a moth of the family Gelechiidae. It was described by Hans Georg Amsel in 1942. It is found in Palestine.
