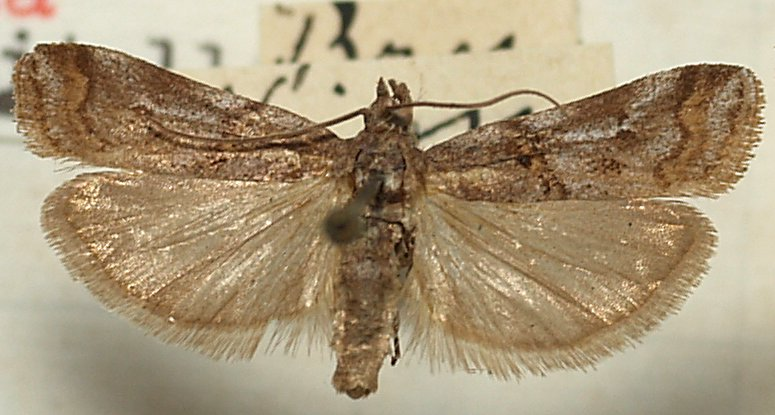
- Khorassania compositella mounted

Scientific classification
- Domain: Eukaryota
- Kingdom: Animalia
- Phylum: Arthropoda
- Class: Insecta
- Order: Lepidoptera
- Family: Pyralidae
- Subfamily: Phycitinae
- Tribe: Phycitini
- Genus: Khorassania; Amsel, 1951

Synonyms
- Abrephia Amsel, 1953; Brephia Heinemann, 1865

= Khorassania =

Genus of moths

Khorassania is a genus of snout moths described by Hans Georg Amsel in 1951

== Species ==
- Khorassania compositella (Treitschke, 1835)
- Khorassania hartigi Amsel, 1951
