= Dysspastus baldizzonei =

Scientific classification
- Kingdom: Animalia
- Phylum: Arthropoda
- Clade: Pancrustacea
- Class: Insecta
- Order: Lepidoptera
- Family: Autostichidae
- Genus: Dysspastus
- Species: D. baldizzonei

Binomial name
- Dysspastus baldizzonei Gozmány, 1977

Species of moth

Dysspastus baldizzonei is a moth of the family Autostichidae. It is found on Crete.
