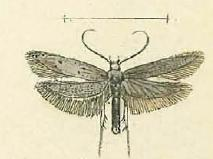

Scientific classification
- Domain: Eukaryota
- Kingdom: Animalia
- Phylum: Arthropoda
- Class: Insecta
- Order: Lepidoptera
- Family: Autostichidae
- Genus: Dysspastus
- Species: D. undecimpunctella

Binomial name
- Dysspastus undecimpunctella (Mann, 1864)

Synonyms
- Symmoca undecimpunctella Mann, 1864

= Dysspastus undecimpunctella =

Species of moth

Dysspastus undecimpunctella is a moth of the family Autostichidae. It is found in Croatia, Albania, North Macedonia, Greece and Turkey.
