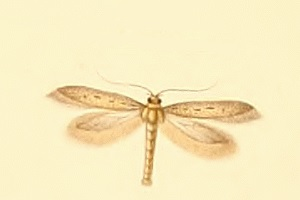

Scientific classification
- Domain: Eukaryota
- Kingdom: Animalia
- Phylum: Arthropoda
- Class: Insecta
- Order: Lepidoptera
- Family: Gelechiidae
- Genus: Epidola
- Species: E. barcinonella

Binomial name
- Epidola barcinonella Milliere, 1867

= Epidola barcinonella =

Species of moth

Epidola barcinonella is a moth of the family Gelechiidae. It was described by Pierre Millière in 1867. It is found in Spain, France, Greece and on Sicily.

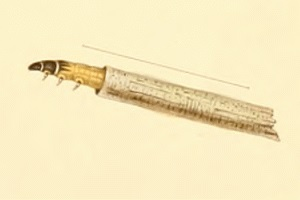
Larva
