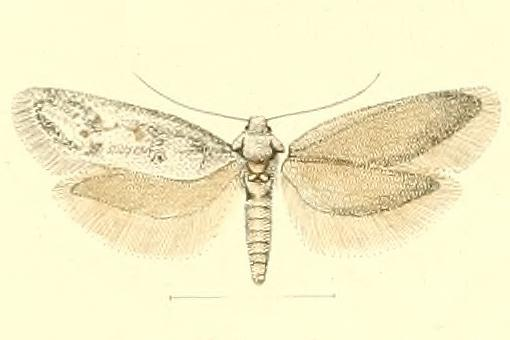
- Dysspastus musculina

Scientific classification
- Kingdom: Animalia
- Phylum: Arthropoda
- Clade: Pancrustacea
- Class: Insecta
- Order: Lepidoptera
- Family: Autostichidae
- Subfamily: Symmocinae
- Genus: Dysspastus; Gozmány, 1964

= Dysspastus =

Genus of moths

Dysspastus is a Palearctic moth genus in the family Autostichidae.

== Species ==
- Dysspastus baldizzonei Gozmány, 1977
- Dysspastus cinerascens Gozmány, 1969
- Dysspastus djinn (Gozmány, 1963)
- Dysspastus erroris (Gozmány, 1962)
- Dysspastus fallax (Gozmány, 1961)
- Dysspastus gracilellus (Turati, 1922)
- Dysspastus hartigi Gozmány, 1977
- Dysspastus hebraicus Gozmány, 2008
- Dysspastus ios Gozmány, 2000
- Dysspastus lilliput Gozmány, 1996
- Dysspastus mediterraneus (Gozmány, 1957)
- Dysspastus mucronatus Gozmány, 2008
- Dysspastus musculina (Staudinger, 1870)
- Dysspastus perpygmaeella (Walsingham, 1901)
- Dysspastus undecimpunctella (Mann, 1864)
