= Khorassania hartigi =

Scientific classification
- Domain: Eukaryota
- Kingdom: Animalia
- Phylum: Arthropoda
- Class: Insecta
- Order: Lepidoptera
- Family: Pyralidae
- Genus: Khorassania
- Species: K. hartigi

Binomial name
- Khorassania hartigi Amsel, 1951

Species of moth

Khorassania hartigi is a species of snout moth in the genus Khorassania. It was described by Hans Georg Amsel in 1951. It is found in Iran.
