= Dysspastus fallax =

Scientific classification
- Kingdom: Animalia
- Phylum: Arthropoda
- Clade: Pancrustacea
- Class: Insecta
- Order: Lepidoptera
- Family: Autostichidae
- Genus: Dysspastus
- Species: D. fallax

Binomial name
- Dysspastus fallax (Gozmány, 1961)

Synonyms
- Donaspastus fallax Gozmány, 1961; Donaspastus demon Gozmány 1963; Dysspastus uncinatus Gozmány, 1976

Species of moth

Dysspastus fallax is a moth of the family Autostichidae. It is found on the Iberian Peninsula and in France.
