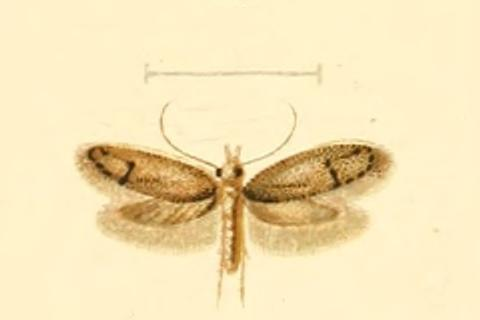
- Pantacordis scotinella

Scientific classification
- Kingdom: Animalia
- Phylum: Arthropoda
- Clade: Pancrustacea
- Class: Insecta
- Order: Lepidoptera
- Family: Autostichidae
- Subfamily: Symmocinae
- Genus: Pantacordis; Gozmány, 1954

= Pantacordis =

Genus of moths

Pantacordis is a moth genus in the family Autostichidae.

== Species ==
- Pantacordis pales Gozmány, 1954
- Pantacordis pallida (Staudinger, 1876)
- Pantacordis klimeschi (Gozmány, 1957)
- Pantacordis pantsa (Gozmány, 1963)
- Pantacordis scotinella (Rebel, 1916)
