= Pantacordis klimeschi =

Scientific classification
- Kingdom: Animalia
- Phylum: Arthropoda
- Clade: Pancrustacea
- Class: Insecta
- Order: Lepidoptera
- Family: Autostichidae
- Genus: Pantacordis
- Species: P. klimeschi

Binomial name
- Pantacordis klimeschi (Gozmány, 1957)

Synonyms
- Eremica klimeschi Gozmány, 1957

Species of moth

Pantacordis klimeschi is a moth in the family Autostichidae. It was described by László Anthony Gozmány in 1957. It is found on Sicily.
