= Dysspastus erroris =

Scientific classification
- Kingdom: Animalia
- Phylum: Arthropoda
- Clade: Pancrustacea
- Class: Insecta
- Order: Lepidoptera
- Family: Autostichidae
- Genus: Dysspastus
- Species: D. erroris

Binomial name
- Dysspastus erroris (Gozmány, 1962)

Synonyms
- Donaspastus erroris Gozmány, 1962

Species of moth

Dysspastus erroris is a moth in the family Autostichidae. It was described by László Anthony Gozmány in 1962. It is found in Algeria.
