= Pantacordis pantsa =

Scientific classification
- Kingdom: Animalia
- Phylum: Arthropoda
- Clade: Pancrustacea
- Class: Insecta
- Order: Lepidoptera
- Family: Autostichidae
- Genus: Pantacordis
- Species: P. pantsa

Binomial name
- Pantacordis pantsa (Gozmány, 1963)

Synonyms
- Eremica pantsa Gozmány, 1963

Species of moth

Pantacordis pantsa is a moth of the family Autostichidae. It is found in Greece and North Macedonia.
