= Epidola stigma =

Scientific classification
- Domain: Eukaryota
- Kingdom: Animalia
- Phylum: Arthropoda
- Class: Insecta
- Order: Lepidoptera
- Family: Gelechiidae
- Genus: Epidola
- Species: E. stigma

Binomial name
- Epidola stigma Staudinger, 1859

Synonyms
- Epidola flava Amsel, 1942

Species of moth

Epidola stigma is a moth of the family Gelechiidae. It was described by Staudinger in 1859. It is found in North Africa, Portugal, Spain, France, Greece and on the Canary Islands and Cyprus.
