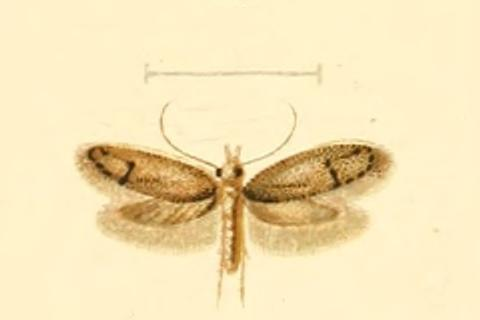

Scientific classification
- Domain: Eukaryota
- Kingdom: Animalia
- Phylum: Arthropoda
- Class: Insecta
- Order: Lepidoptera
- Family: Autostichidae
- Genus: Pantacordis
- Species: P. scotinella

Binomial name
- Pantacordis scotinella (Rebel, 1916)

Synonyms
- Borkhausenia scotinella Rebel, 1916; Pantacordis scotinellum

= Pantacordis scotinella =

Species of moth

Pantacordis scotinella is a moth of the family Autostichidae. It is found on Crete.
