= Dysspastus hebraicus =

Scientific classification
- Kingdom: Animalia
- Phylum: Arthropoda
- Clade: Pancrustacea
- Class: Insecta
- Order: Lepidoptera
- Family: Autostichidae
- Genus: Dysspastus
- Species: D. hebraicus

Binomial name
- Dysspastus hebraicus Gozmány, 2008

Species of moth

Dysspastus hebraicus is a moth in the family Autostichidae. It was described by László Anthony Gozmány in 2008. It is found in Israel.
