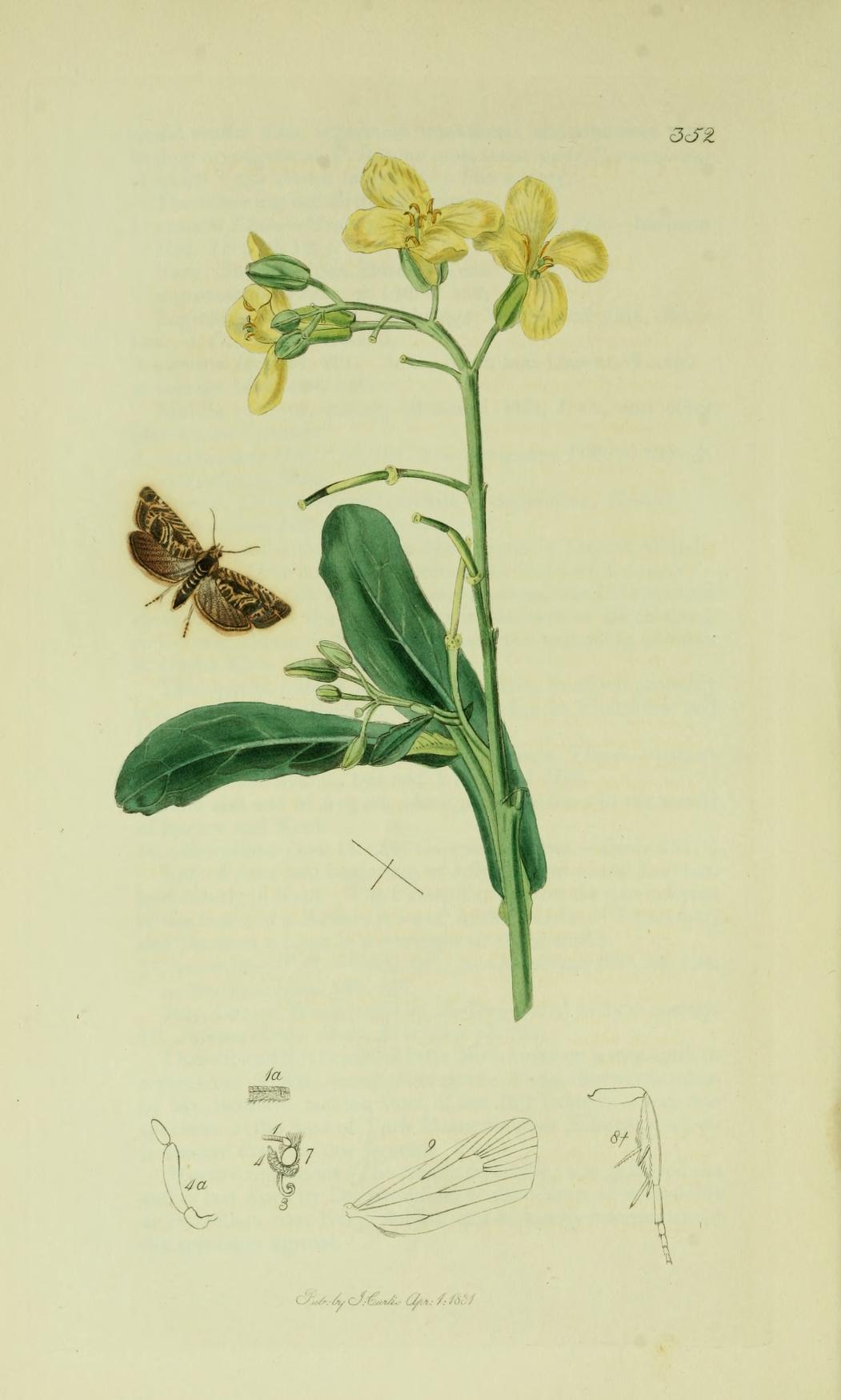
- An illustration from British Entomology

Scientific classification
- Kingdom: Animalia
- Phylum: Arthropoda
- Class: Insecta
- Order: Lepidoptera
- Family: Tortricidae
- Tribe: Grapholitini
- Genus: Selania; Stephens, 1834

Synonyms
- Chretienia Obraztsov, 1968; Mevlanaia Kocak, 1981

= Selania =

Genus of tortrix moths

Selania is a genus of moths belonging to the subfamily Olethreutinae of the family Tortricidae.

== Species ==
- Selania acquiescens Diakonoff, 1976
- Selania aeologramma (Meyrick, 1916)
- Selania bengalica (Obraztsov, 1968)
- Selania capparidana (Zeller, 1847)
- Selania costifuscana Aarvik, 2004
- Selania detrita (Meyrick, 1928)
- Selania diplosperma (Diakonoff, 1984)
- Selania exornata (Diakonoff, 1969)
- Selania friganosa Kuznetzov, in Danilevsky & Kuznetsov, 1968
- Selania leplastriana (Curtis, 1831)
- Selania macella Diakonoff, 1976
- Selania minuta (Obraztsov, 1968)
- Selania planifrontana (Rebel, 1912)
- Selania resedana (Obraztsov, 1959)

== See also ==
- List of Tortricidae genera
