= Coleophora jefreniensis =

Scientific classification
- Kingdom: Animalia
- Phylum: Arthropoda
- Class: Insecta
- Order: Lepidoptera
- Family: Coleophoridae
- Genus: Coleophora
- Species: C. jefreniensis

Binomial name
- Coleophora jefreniensis Toll, 1954

Synonyms
- Coleophora incanella Toll, 1952 (Junior primary homonym of Coleophora incanella Tengström, 1848); Coleophora percanella Oudejans, 1971 (Replacement name for Coleophora incanella Toll, 1952)

Species of moth

Coleophora jefreniensis is a moth of the family Coleophoridae. It is found in Tunisia and on Malta.
