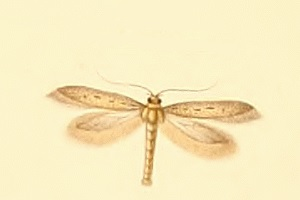
- Epidola barcinonella

Scientific classification
- Domain: Eukaryota
- Kingdom: Animalia
- Phylum: Arthropoda
- Class: Insecta
- Order: Lepidoptera
- Family: Gelechiidae
- Subfamily: Apatetrinae
- Tribe: Apatetrini
- Genus: Epidola; Staudinger, 1859

= Epidola =

Genus of moths

Epidola is a genus of moths in the family Gelechiidae.

== Species ==
- Epidola barcinonella Milliere, 1867
- Epidola lilyella Lucas, 1945
- Epidola melitensis Amsel, 1955
- Epidola nuraghella Hartig, 1939
- Epidola semitica Amsel, 1942
- Epidola stigma Staudinger, 1859

== Status unknown ==
- Epidola grisea Amsel, 1942, described from Sardinia.
