= Dysspastus mediterraneus =

Scientific classification
- Kingdom: Animalia
- Phylum: Arthropoda
- Clade: Pancrustacea
- Class: Insecta
- Order: Lepidoptera
- Family: Autostichidae
- Genus: Dysspastus
- Species: D. mediterraneus

Binomial name
- Dysspastus mediterraneus (Gozmány, 1957)

Synonyms
- Donaspastus mediterraneus Gozmány, 1957

Species of moth

Dysspastus mediterraneus is a moth of the family Autostichidae and subfamily Symmocinae . It is found on Sicily.
