= Pantacordis pales =

Scientific classification
- Kingdom: Animalia
- Phylum: Arthropoda
- Clade: Pancrustacea
- Class: Insecta
- Order: Lepidoptera
- Family: Autostichidae
- Genus: Pantacordis
- Species: P. pales

Binomial name
- Pantacordis pales Gozmány, 1954

Species of moth

Pantacordis pales is a moth of the family Autostichidae. It is found in Croatia, Slovakia, Hungary and Romania.

The wingspan is 12-13.5 mm.
