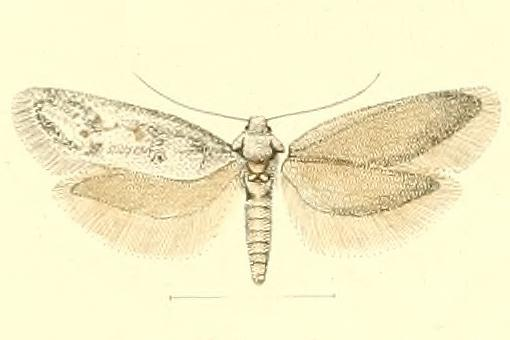

Scientific classification
- Domain: Eukaryota
- Kingdom: Animalia
- Phylum: Arthropoda
- Class: Insecta
- Order: Lepidoptera
- Family: Autostichidae
- Genus: Dysspastus
- Species: D. musculina

Binomial name
- Dysspastus musculina (Staudinger, 1870)

Synonyms
- Symmoca musculina Staudinger, 1870; Dysspastus musculinus

= Dysspastus musculina =

Species of moth

Dysspastus musculina is a moth of the family Autostichidae. It is found in Greece.

The wingspan is about 10.5 mm. The forewings appear uniform dark grey, but are in fact ash grey with brownish black scales. The hindwings are black.
