= Metallostichodes bicolorella =

Scientific classification
- Kingdom: Animalia
- Phylum: Arthropoda
- Clade: Pancrustacea
- Class: Insecta
- Order: Lepidoptera
- Family: Pyralidae
- Genus: Metallostichodes
- Species: M. bicolorella

Binomial name
- Metallostichodes bicolorella (Heinemann, 1864)

Synonyms
- Myelois bicolorella Heinemann, 1864

Species of moth

Metallostichodes bicolorella is a species of snout moth. It is found in France and Turkey.
