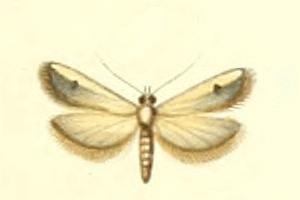
- Metallostichodes nigrocyanella

Scientific classification
- Kingdom: Animalia
- Phylum: Arthropoda
- Class: Insecta
- Order: Lepidoptera
- Family: Pyralidae
- Tribe: Phycitini
- Genus: Metallostichodes; Roesler, 1967

= Metallostichodes =

Genus of moths

Metallostichodes is a genus of snout moths.

== Species ==
- Metallostichodes bicolorella (Heinemann, 1864)
- Metallostichodes nigrocyanella (Constant, 1865)
- Metallostichodes povolnyi Roesler, 1983
- Metallostichodes vinaceella (Ragonot, 1895)
