= Dysspastus hartigi =

Scientific classification
- Kingdom: Animalia
- Phylum: Arthropoda
- Clade: Pancrustacea
- Class: Insecta
- Order: Lepidoptera
- Family: Autostichidae
- Genus: Dysspastus
- Species: D. hartigi

Binomial name
- Dysspastus hartigi Gozmány, 1977

Species of moth

Dysspastus hartigi is a moth of the family Autostichidae. It is found in Italy.
