= Dysspastus perpygmaeella =

Scientific classification
- Domain: Eukaryota
- Kingdom: Animalia
- Phylum: Arthropoda
- Class: Insecta
- Order: Lepidoptera
- Family: Autostichidae
- Genus: Dysspastus
- Species: D. perpygmaeella

Binomial name
- Dysspastus perpygmaeella (Walsingham, 1901)

Synonyms
- Symmoca perpygmaeella Walsingham, 1901; Symmocoides similis Amsel 1939; Symmocoides albella Amsel, 1939

Species of moth

Dysspastus perpygmaeella is a moth of the family Autostichidae. It is found on Corsica and Sardinia.

The wingspan is 9–10 mm. The forewings are stone-grey, thickly sprinkled with pale greyish fuscous scaling. The hindwings are dull grey.
