= Metallostichodes vinaceella =

Scientific classification
- Kingdom: Animalia
- Phylum: Arthropoda
- Class: Insecta
- Order: Lepidoptera
- Family: Pyralidae
- Genus: Metallostichodes
- Species: M. vinaceella

Binomial name
- Metallostichodes vinaceella (Ragonot, 1895)

Synonyms
- Cateremna vinaceella

Species of moth

Metallostichodes vinaceella is a species of snout moth. It is found in Syria and Turkey.
