= Epidola nuraghella =

Scientific classification
- Domain: Eukaryota
- Kingdom: Animalia
- Phylum: Arthropoda
- Class: Insecta
- Order: Lepidoptera
- Family: Gelechiidae
- Genus: Epidola
- Species: E. nuraghella

Binomial name
- Epidola nuraghella Hartig, 1939

Species of moth

Epidola nuraghella is a moth of the family Gelechiidae. It was described by Friedrich Hartig in 1939. It is found on Corsica, Sardinia and Sicily.
