= Metallostichodes povolnyi =

Scientific classification
- Kingdom: Animalia
- Phylum: Arthropoda
- Class: Insecta
- Order: Lepidoptera
- Family: Pyralidae
- Genus: Metallostichodes
- Species: M. povolnyi

Binomial name
- Metallostichodes povolnyi Roesler, 1983

Species of moth

Metallostichodes povolnyi is a species of snout moth. It is found on Sumatra.
