= Dysspastus gracilellus =

Scientific classification
- Domain: Eukaryota
- Kingdom: Animalia
- Phylum: Arthropoda
- Class: Insecta
- Order: Lepidoptera
- Family: Autostichidae
- Genus: Dysspastus
- Species: D. gracilellus

Binomial name
- Dysspastus gracilellus (Turati, 1922)

Synonyms
- Symmoca gracilellus Turati, 1922; Symmoca desertella Turati, 1924

Species of moth

Dysspastus gracilellus is a moth of the family Autostichidae. It is found on Sicily.
