= Dysspastus cinerascens =

Scientific classification
- Kingdom: Animalia
- Phylum: Arthropoda
- Clade: Pancrustacea
- Class: Insecta
- Order: Lepidoptera
- Family: Autostichidae
- Genus: Dysspastus
- Species: D. cinerascens

Binomial name
- Dysspastus cinerascens Gozmány, 1969

Species of moth

Dysspastus cinerascens is a moth in the family Autostichidae. It was described by László Anthony Gozmány in 1969. It is found in Asia Minor.
