= Dysspastus djinn =

Scientific classification
- Kingdom: Animalia
- Phylum: Arthropoda
- Clade: Pancrustacea
- Class: Insecta
- Order: Lepidoptera
- Family: Autostichidae
- Genus: Dysspastus
- Species: D. djinn

Binomial name
- Dysspastus djinn (Gozmány, 1963)

Synonyms
- Donaspastus djinn Gozmány, 1963

Species of moth

Dysspastus djinn is a moth in the family Autostichidae. It was described by László Anthony Gozmány in 1963. It is found in Lebanon.
