= Coleophora crepidinella =

Scientific classification
- Kingdom: Animalia
- Phylum: Arthropoda
- Clade: Pancrustacea
- Class: Insecta
- Order: Lepidoptera
- Family: Coleophoridae
- Genus: Coleophora
- Species: C. crepidinella

Binomial name
- Coleophora crepidinella Zeller, 1847

Synonyms
- Coleophora betae Falkovitsh, 1978; Coleophora flavogrisea Toll, 1942

Species of moth

Coleophora crepidinella is a moth of the family Coleophoridae. It is found on the Iberian Peninsula, Mallorca, Sardinia, Sicily and in Greece.

The larvae feed on Beta maritima. At flowering time the larvae feed on the ground leaves. Later, they feed on the fruits.
