= Agonopterix thapsiella =

Scientific classification
- Kingdom: Animalia
- Phylum: Arthropoda
- Clade: Pancrustacea
- Class: Insecta
- Order: Lepidoptera
- Family: Depressariidae
- Genus: Agonopterix
- Species: A. thapsiella

Binomial name
- Agonopterix thapsiella (Zeller, 1847)

Synonyms
- Depressaria thapsiella Zeller, 1847; Depressaria feruliphila Milliere, 1866; Depressaria linolotella Chrétien, 1929

Species of moth

Agonopterix thapsiella is a moth of the family Depressariidae. It is found in France, Spain, Portugal, Italy, Hungary, Greece and on Sardinia, Sicily and Crete.
