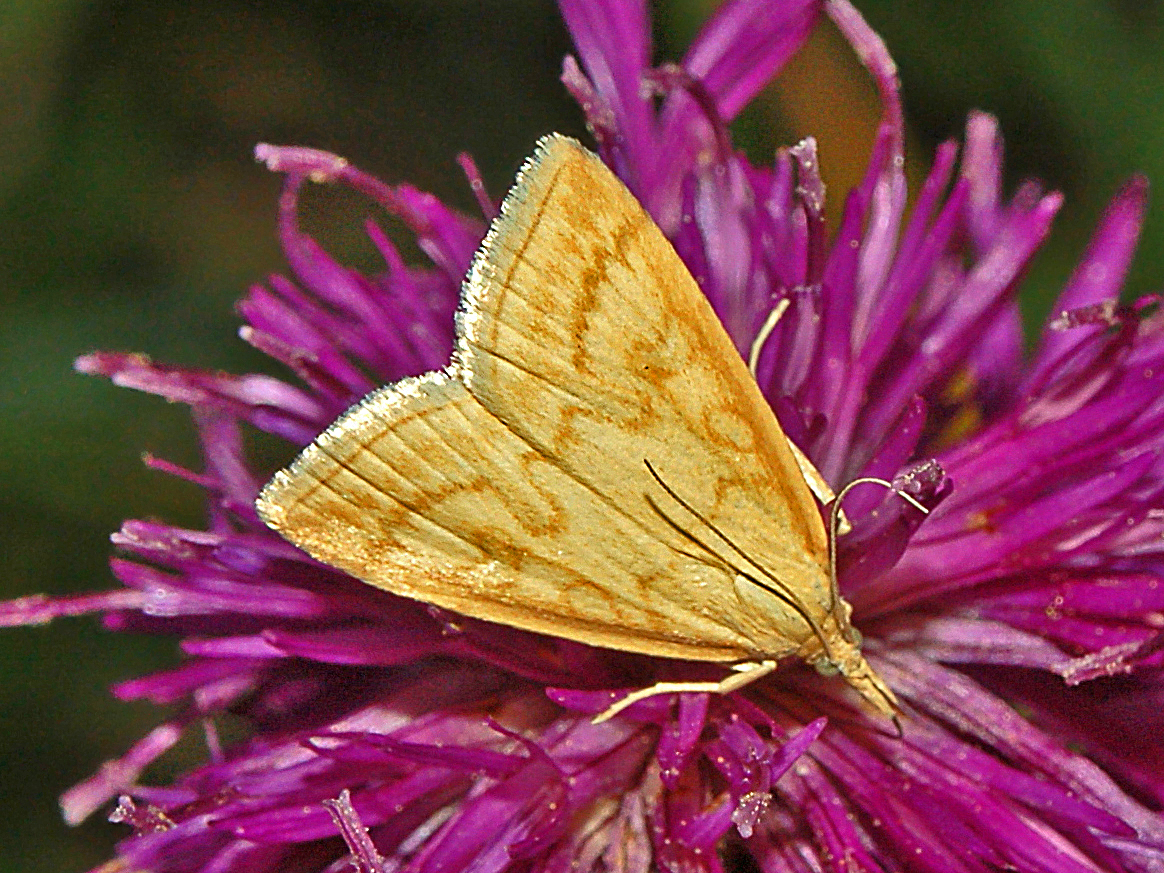
- Dorsal view
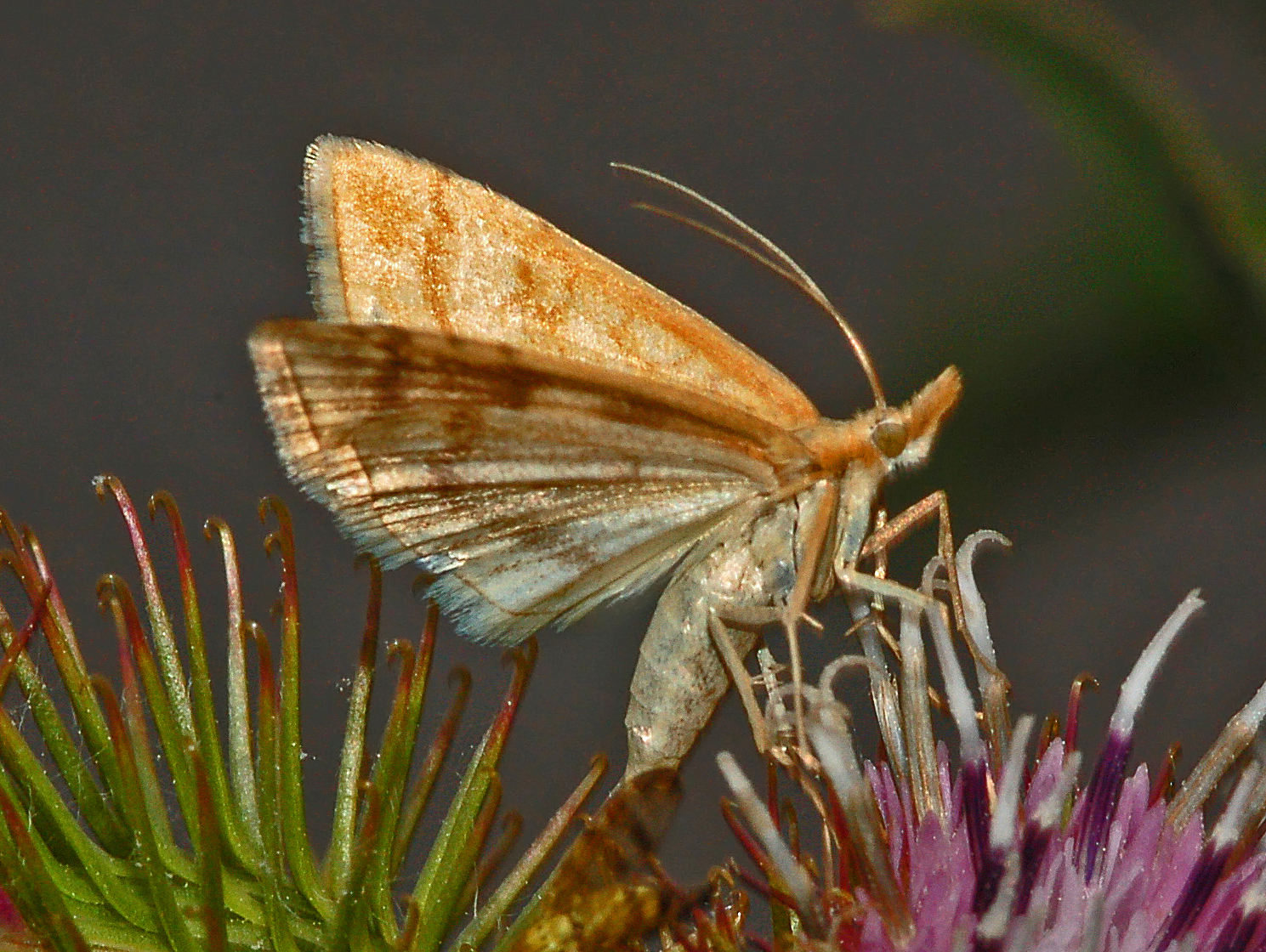
- Ventral view

Scientific classification
- Kingdom: Animalia
- Phylum: Arthropoda
- Clade: Pancrustacea
- Class: Insecta
- Order: Lepidoptera
- Family: Crambidae
- Genus: Udea
- Species: U. lutealis

Binomial name
- Udea lutealis (Hübner, 1809)

Synonyms
- Pyralis lutealis Hübner, 1809; Botys pascualis Lienig & Zeller, 1846; Scopula aetialis Guenée, 1850; Scopula etialis Guenée, 1854; Botys perochrealis Christoph in Romanoff, 1887

= Udea lutealis =

Species of moth

Udea lutealis is a species of moth of the family Crambidae described by Jacob Hübner in 1809.

== Description ==
Udea lutealis has a wingspan of 23–26 mm. Forewings are pale creamy or yellow ocher with darker undulating cross. The hindwings are light gray to whitish on the underside, while the body is whitish. These moths fly at night from June to August depending on the location, in one generation.

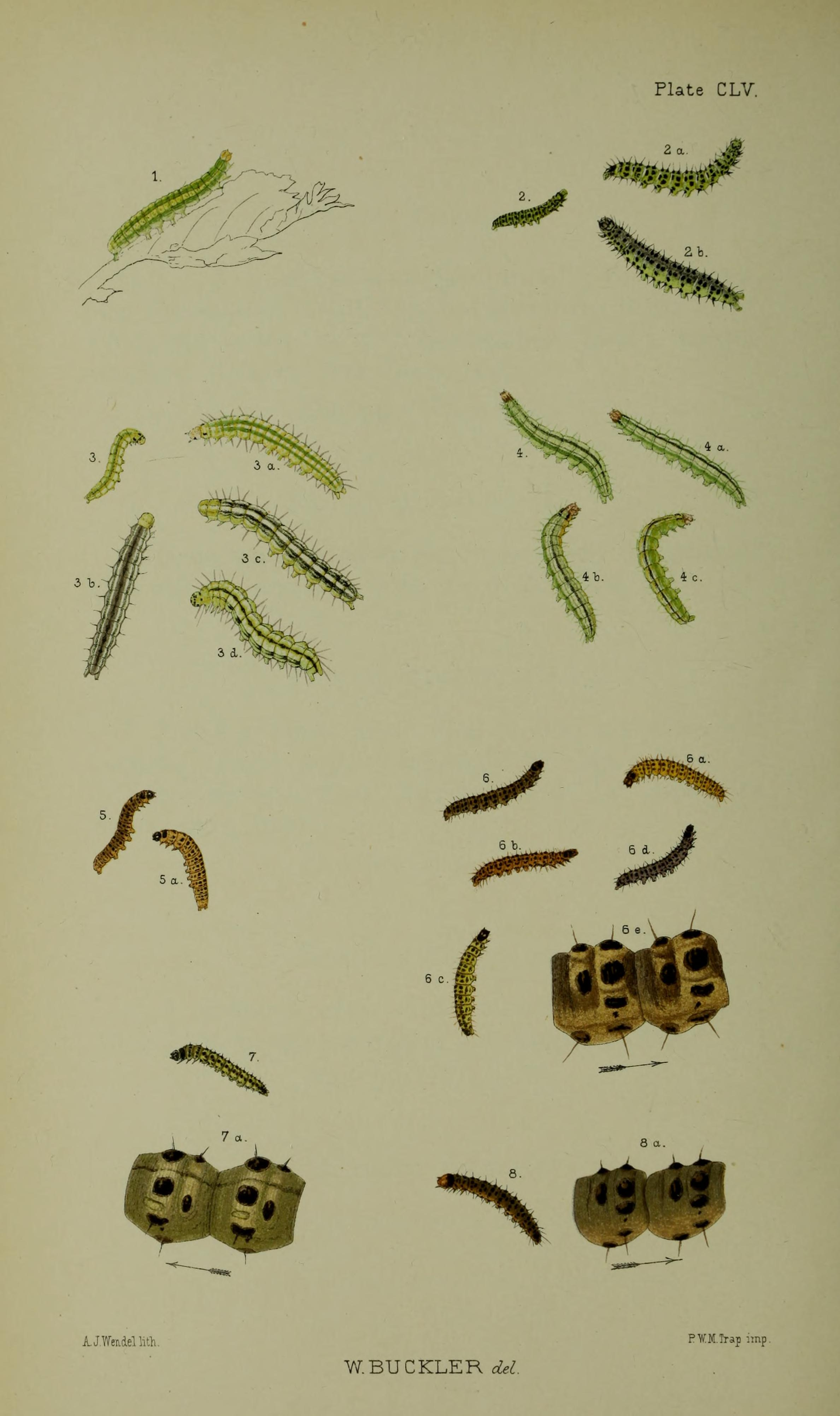
Figs.1 larva after final moult

The larvae are polyphagous, feeding on various herbaceous plants, mainly Rubus, Centaurea, Plantago, Cirsium and Artemisia.

== Distribution ==
Udea lutealis is present in most of Europe.

== Habitat ==
This species prefers humid areas such as fresh meadows, clearings, forest roads, etc.
