= Pantacordis pallida =

Scientific classification
- Domain: Eukaryota
- Kingdom: Animalia
- Phylum: Arthropoda
- Class: Insecta
- Order: Lepidoptera
- Family: Autostichidae
- Genus: Pantacordis
- Species: P. pallida

Binomial name
- Pantacordis pallida (Staudinger, 1876)

Synonyms
- Symmoca pallida Staudinger, 1876; Pantacordis pallidum; Symmoca exiguella Chrétien, 1915; Symmoca minutella Chrétien in Oberthür, 1922

Species of moth

Pantacordis pallida is a moth of the family Autostichidae. It is found in mainland Italy and on Malta and Sicily. It is also found in Morocco and Algeria.

The wingspan is 10–12 mm. Adults are dirty yellowish with a very light darker sprinkling on the forewings.
