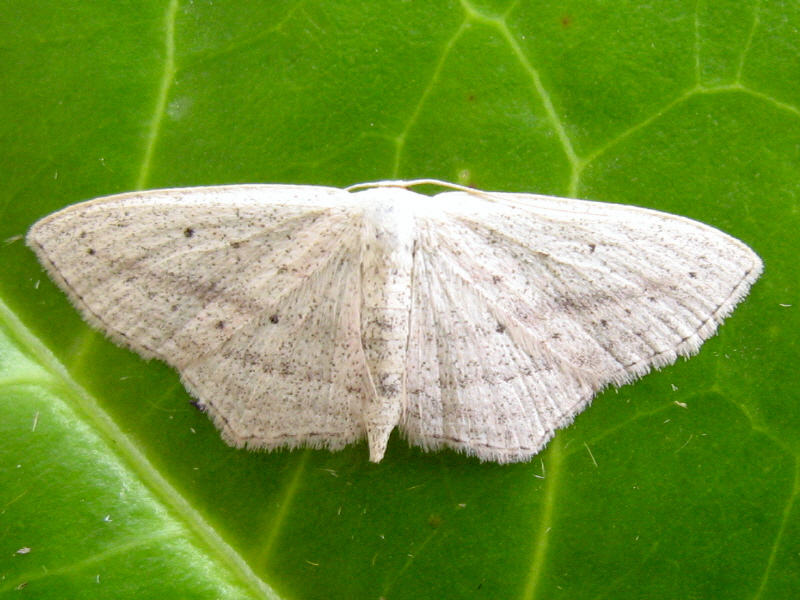

Scientific classification
- Domain: Eukaryota
- Kingdom: Animalia
- Phylum: Arthropoda
- Class: Insecta
- Order: Lepidoptera
- Family: Geometridae
- Genus: Scopula
- Species: S. emutaria

Binomial name
- Scopula emutaria (Hübner, 1809)

Synonyms
- Geometra emutaria Hübner, 1809; Phalaena subroseata Haworth, 1809

= Scopula emutaria =

Rosy wave

Species of geometer moth in subfamily Sterrhinae

Scopula emutaria, the rosy wave, is a species of moth in the family Geometridae. It is found in western and south-western Europe and Romania. Also in North Africa.

The wingspan is 23–26 millimetres (0.91–1.02 in) (sometimes 20–24 millimetres (0.79–0.94 in)). Easy to distinguish by its whitish ground-colour, slight or rather strong pink flush. Most striking is the straight broad line over the wing towards the wing tip.

Adults are on wing from June to July.

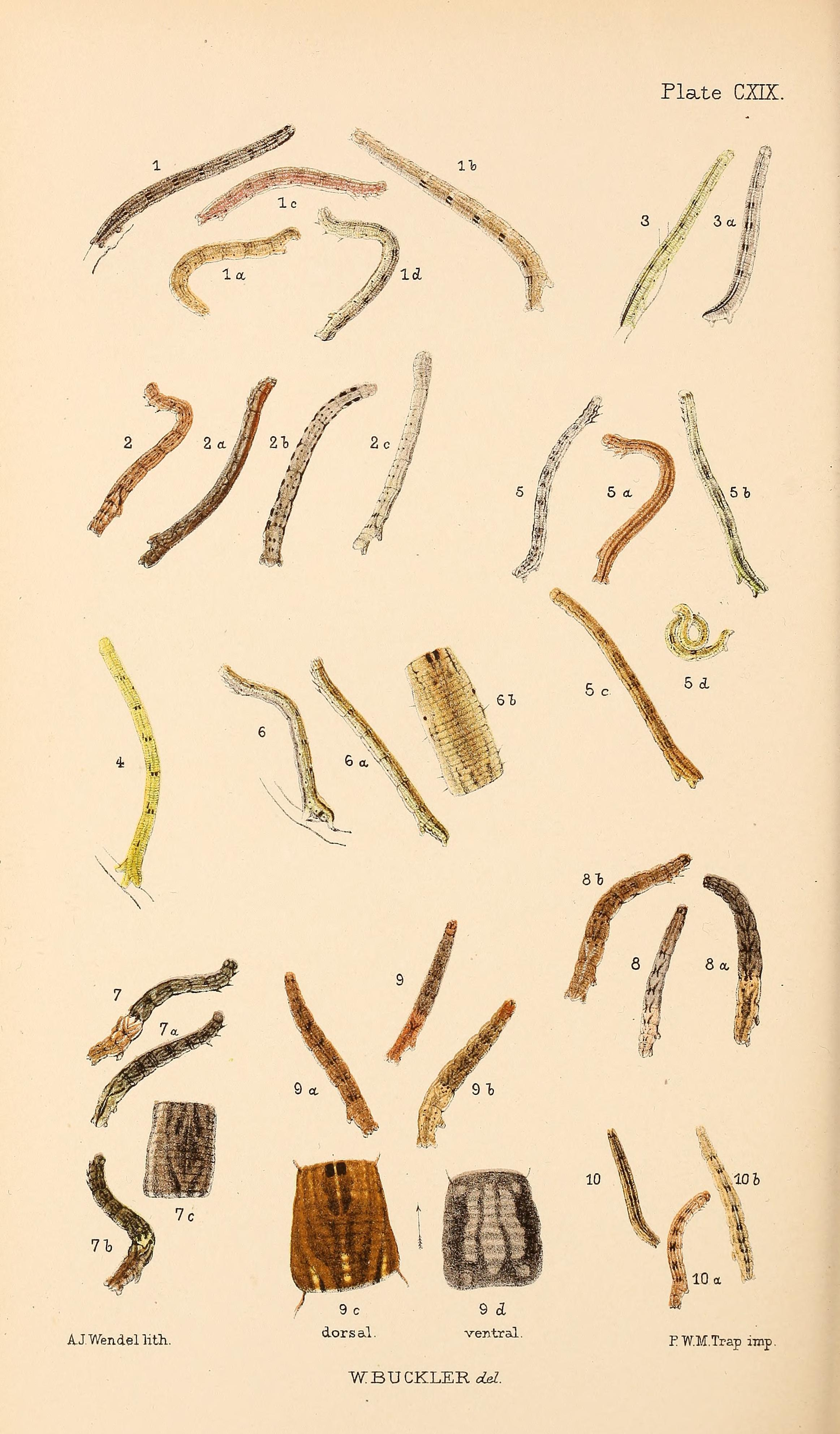
Figs.6, 6a larvae after final moult

It is a coastal species. The larvae feed on sea beet and Armeria maritima.

== Subspecies ==
- Scopula emutaria emutaria
- Scopula emutaria subroseata (Haworth, 1809)
