= Acrobasis obtusella =

Scientific classification
- Kingdom: Animalia
- Phylum: Arthropoda
- Clade: Pancrustacea
- Class: Insecta
- Order: Lepidoptera
- Family: Pyralidae
- Genus: Acrobasis
- Species: A. obtusella

Binomial name
- Acrobasis obtusella (Hübner, 1796)

Synonyms
- Tinea obtusella Hübner, 1796; Nephopterix obtusalis Hübner, 1825; Phycis obtusa Haworth, 1811; Tinea noctuana Hübner, 1793

Species of moth

Acrobasis obtusella is a species of snout moth in the genus Acrobasis. It was described by Jacob Hübner in 1796. It is found in most of Europe.

The wingspan is 15–17 mm.

The larvae feed on Pyrus species. They feed on the tissues of the leaf which they fold irregularly.
