= Selania capparidana =

Scientific classification
- Kingdom: Animalia
- Phylum: Arthropoda
- Class: Insecta
- Order: Lepidoptera
- Family: Tortricidae
- Genus: Selania
- Species: S. capparidana

Binomial name
- Selania capparidana (Zeller, 1847)

Synonyms
- Grapholitha capparidana Zeller, 1847; Laspeyresia capparidana; Grapholitha rhezelana Chrétien, 1915

Species of moth

Selania capparidana is a moth of the family Tortricidae. It was described by Philipp Christoph Zeller in 1847 and is found in Europe.

== Description ==
The wingspan is 9–10 mm.

The larvae feed on the caper bush (Capparis spinosa), mining the leaves of their host plant.

== Distribution ==
The moth is found in the Balearic Islands, Spain, Sardinia, Italy and Greece.
