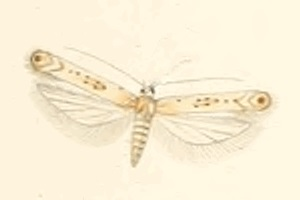

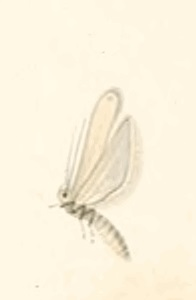

Scientific classification
- Domain: Eukaryota
- Kingdom: Animalia
- Phylum: Arthropoda
- Class: Insecta
- Order: Lepidoptera
- Family: Gelechiidae
- Genus: Scrobipalpa
- Species: S. halymella

Binomial name
- Scrobipalpa halymella (Milliere, [1864])

Synonyms
- Gelechia halymella Milliere, [1864]

= Scrobipalpa halymella =

Species of moth

Scrobipalpa halymella is a moth of the family Gelechiidae. It was described by Milliere in 1864. It is found on the Canary Islands and Malta as well as in Portugal, France and Italy. Outside of Europe, it is found in Morocco, Tunisia and Israel.

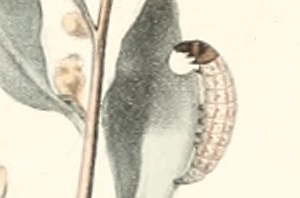
Larva

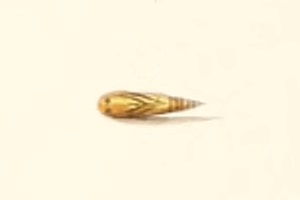
Pupa
