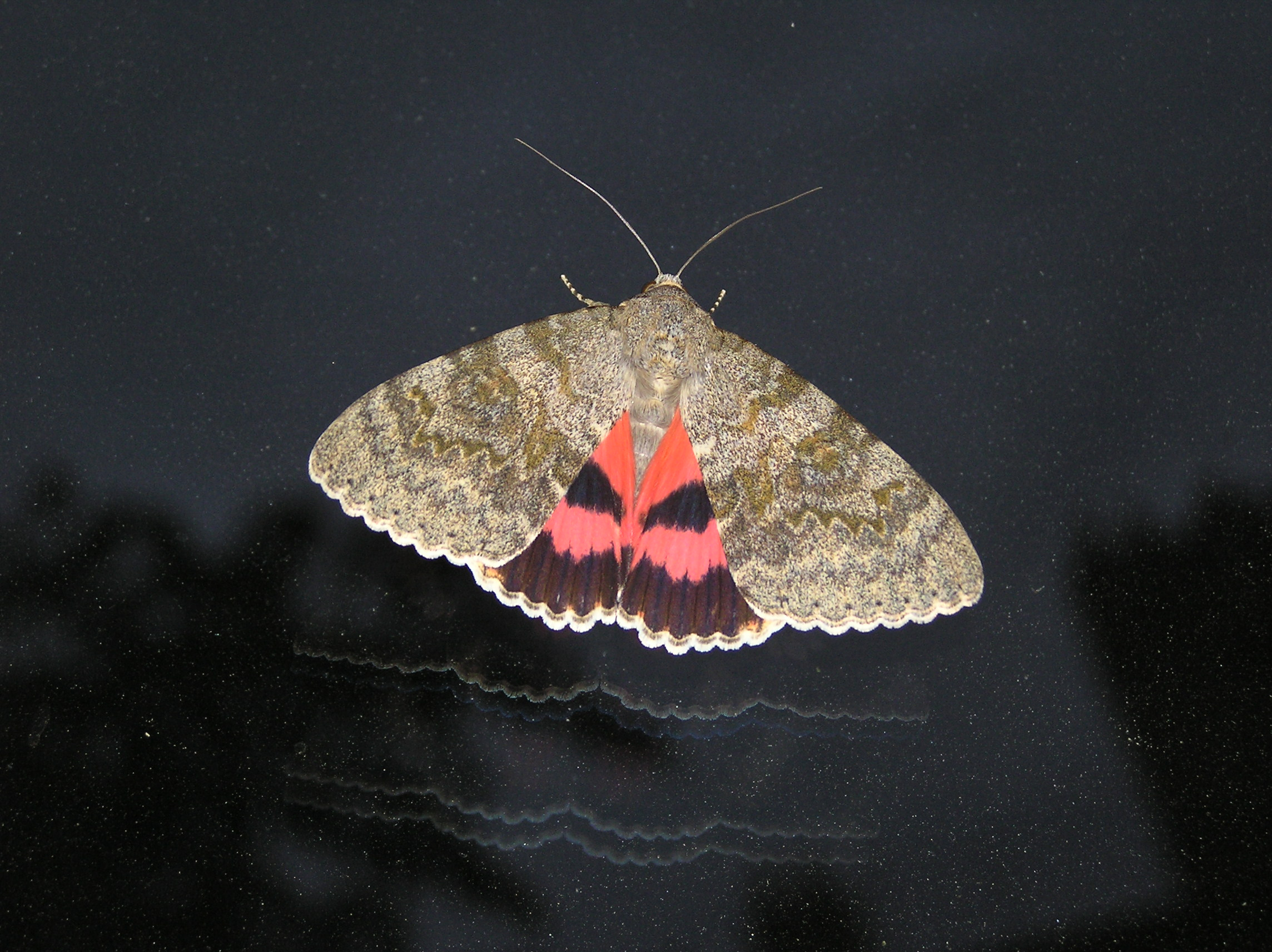

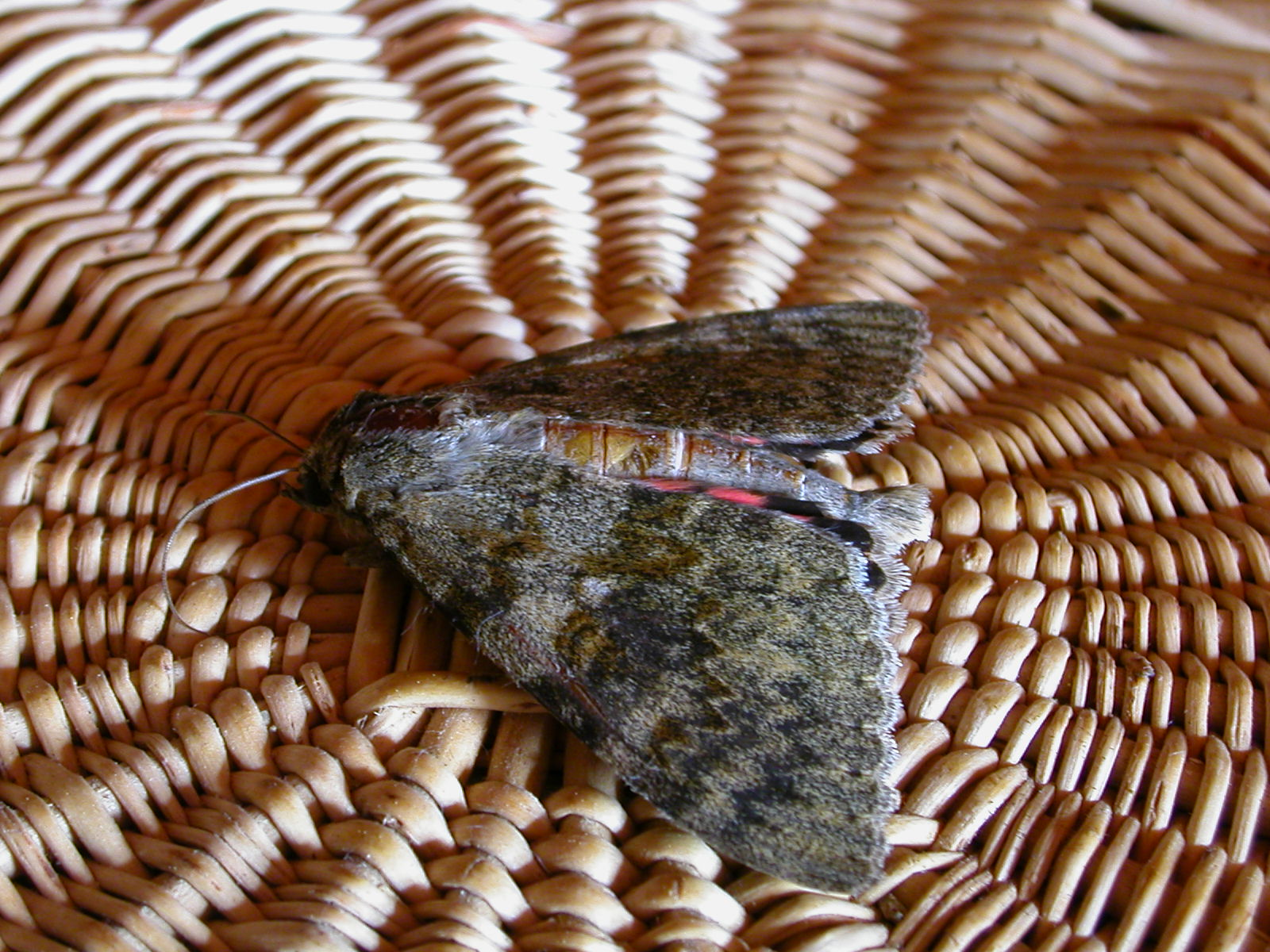

Scientific classification
- Kingdom: Animalia
- Phylum: Arthropoda
- Class: Insecta
- Order: Lepidoptera
- Superfamily: Noctuoidea
- Family: Erebidae
- Genus: Catocala
- Species: C. elocata

Binomial name
- Catocala elocata (Esper, 1787)

Synonyms
- Noctua elocata Esper, 1787; Noctua marita Hübner, [1813]; Noctua nurus Hübner, [1822]; Catocala elocata var. locata Staudinger, [1892]

= Catocala elocata =

French red underwing

Species of moth

Catocala elocata, the French red underwing, is a moth of the family Erebidae. It is found in Central Europe, Southern Europe, North Africa, Anatolia, Uzbekistan, and Kazakhstan.

The larvae feed on poplar and willow.

== Subspecies ==
- Catocala elocata elocata
- Catocala elocata locata Staudinger, [1892] (Uzbekistan)
