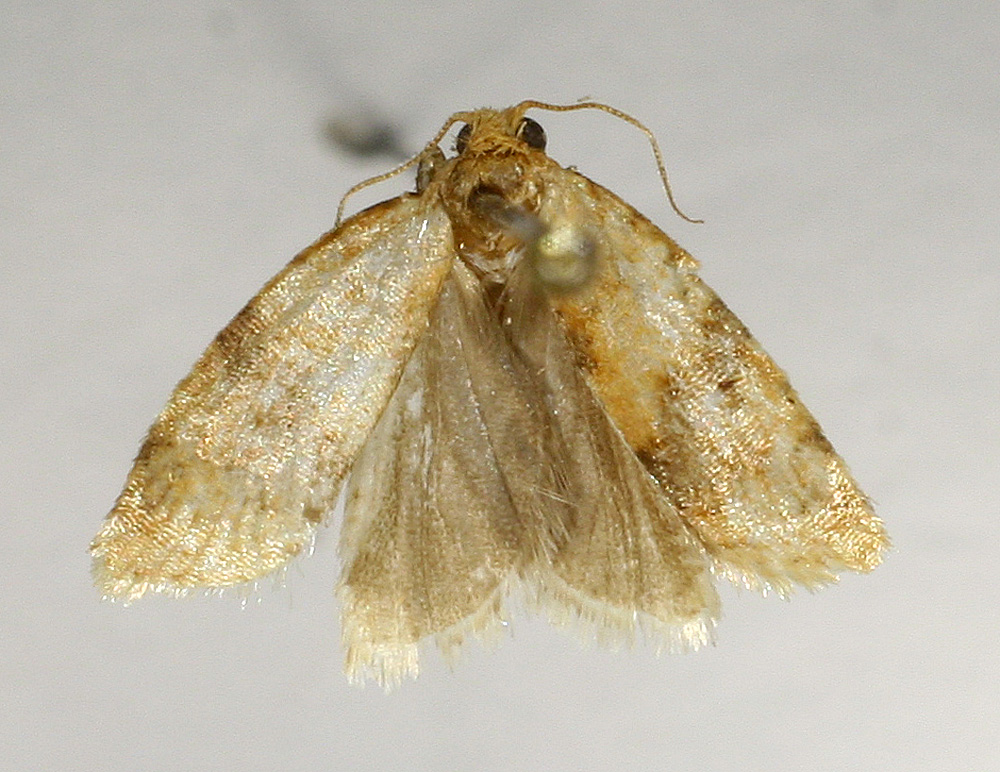

Scientific classification
- Kingdom: Animalia
- Phylum: Arthropoda
- Clade: Pancrustacea
- Class: Insecta
- Order: Lepidoptera
- Family: Tortricidae
- Genus: Clepsis
- Species: C. neglectana

Binomial name
- Clepsis neglectana (Herrich-Schäffer, 1851)

Synonyms
- Tortrix (Lozotaenia) neglectana Herrich-Schäffer, 1851; Tortrix (Heterognomon) betulifoliana Lederer, 1859; Cacoecia delibatana Rothschild, 1912; Tortrix dorana Kennel, 1919; Tortrix flavana Duponchel, in Godart, 1834; Tortrix neglectana Herrich-Schäffer, 1847; Tortrix severana Kennel, 1901; Tortrix striolana Ragonot, 1879; Tortrix xylotoma Meyrick, 1891

= Clepsis neglectana =

Species of moth

Clepsis neglectana is a moth of the family Tortricidae. It is found in most of Europe, as well as the Ural Mountains, North Africa, Near East and Central Asia.

The wingspan is 12–16 mm. Adults are on wing in April and again from June to July in Europe.

The larvae feed on Fragaria species.
