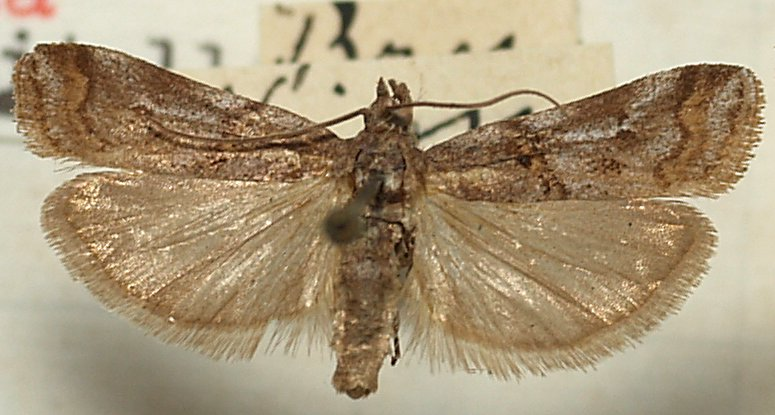

Scientific classification
- Kingdom: Animalia
- Phylum: Arthropoda
- Clade: Pancrustacea
- Class: Insecta
- Order: Lepidoptera
- Family: Pyralidae
- Genus: Khorassania
- Species: K. compositella

Binomial name
- Khorassania compositella (Treitschke, 1835)

Synonyms
- Phycis compositella Treitschke, 1835; Khorassania compositella kalischiella (Staudinger, 1870)

= Khorassania compositella =

Species of moth

Khorassania compositella is a moth of the family Pyralidae. It is found in Europe.

The wingspan is 20–24 mm. In Belgium, the moth flies from May to October.

The larvae feed on Artemisia campestris.
