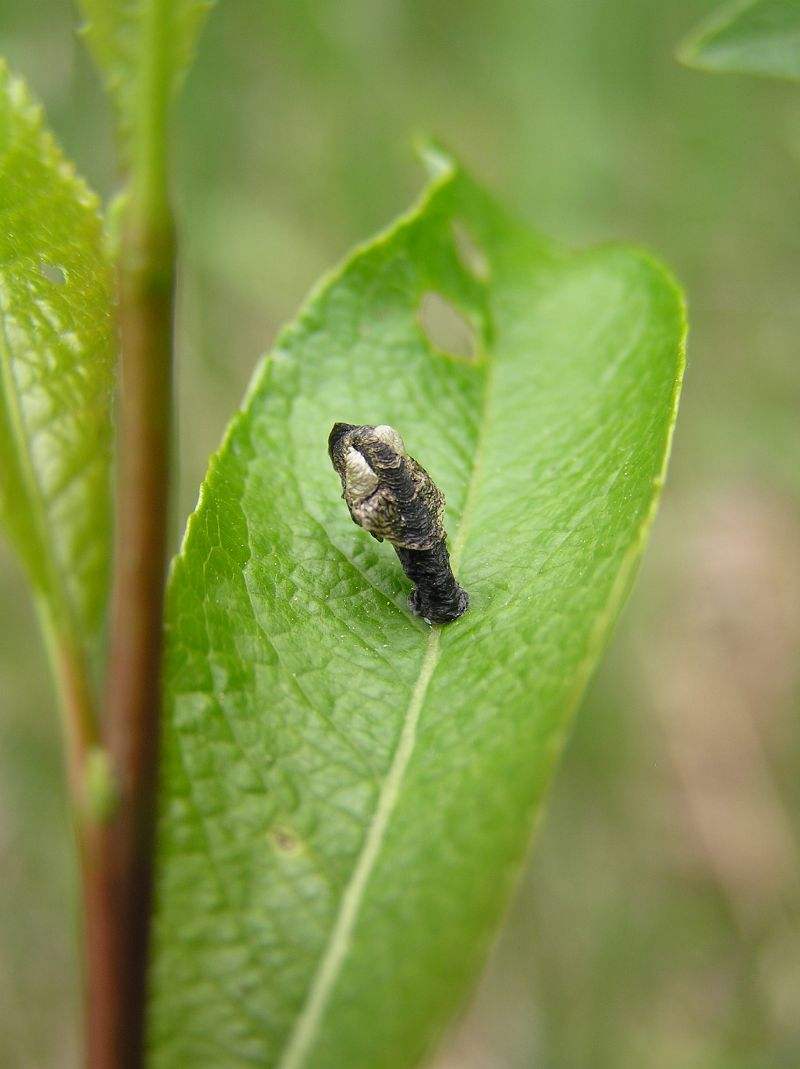

Scientific classification
- Kingdom: Animalia
- Phylum: Arthropoda
- Class: Insecta
- Order: Lepidoptera
- Family: Coleophoridae
- Genus: Coleophora
- Species: C. albidella

Binomial name
- Coleophora albidella (Denis & Schiffermüller, 1775)

Synonyms
- List: Tinea albidella Denis & Schiffermüller, 1775; Phalena (Tinea) trembleyella Villers, 1789; Coleophora incanella Tengström, 1848; Coleophora anatipennella Pierce & Metcalfe, 1935 (non Hübner, 1796: preoccupied); Coleophora razowskii Capuse, 1971

= Coleophora albidella =

Species of moth

Coleophora albidella is a moth of the family Coleophoridae found in Europe. It was first described in 1775 by Michael Denis and Ignaz Schiffermüller,

== Description ==
The wingspan is 13–16 mm. White with sparse, sometimes obscure, darker speckling. Forewing ground colour white. Apical cilia greyish fuscous. Antennal scape with a well-developed basal tuft. Only reliably identified by dissection and microscopic examination of the genitalia.

Adults are on wing from June to July.

The larvae feed on various species of willow including, Salix repens, Salix aurita, Salix cinerea and sometimes Salix caprea.

== Distribution ==
It is found in all of Europe, except the Balkan Peninsula.

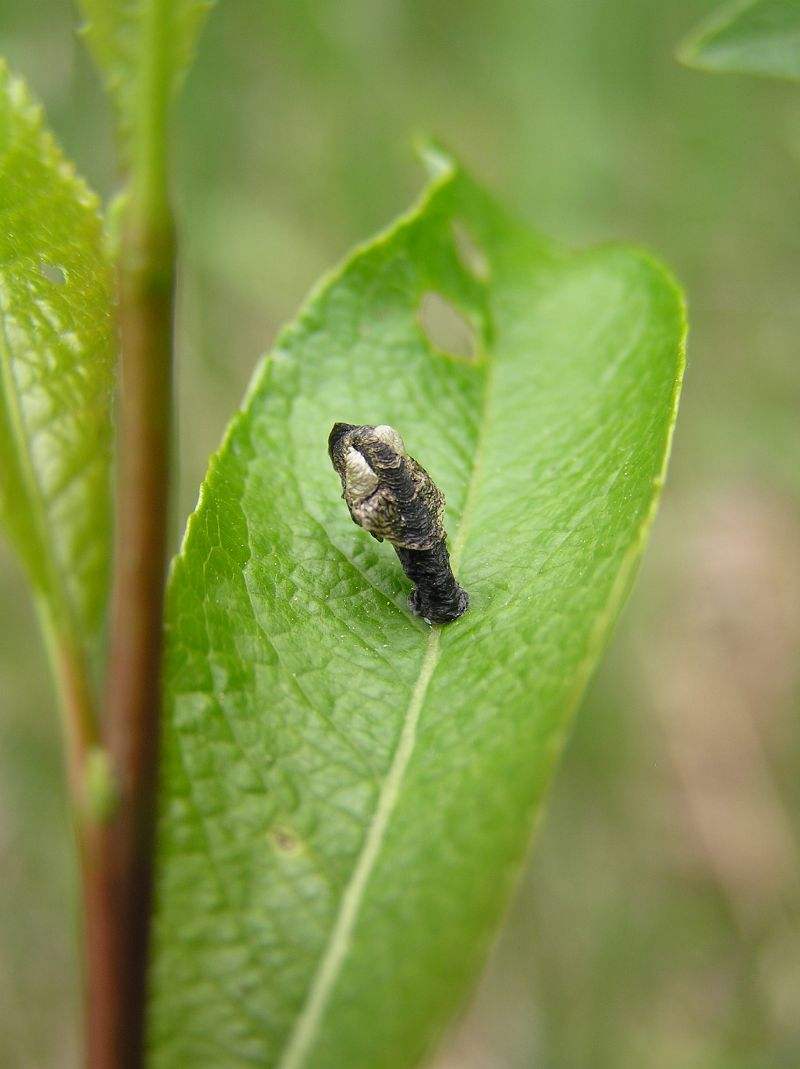
Case

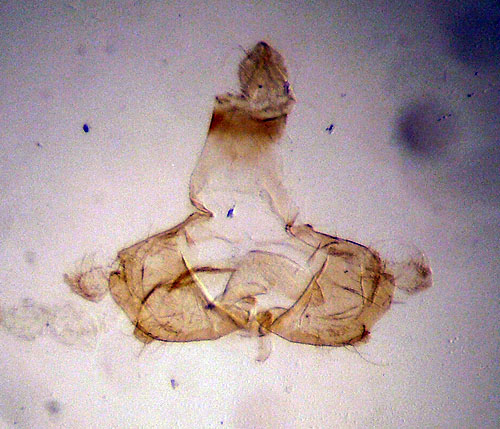
