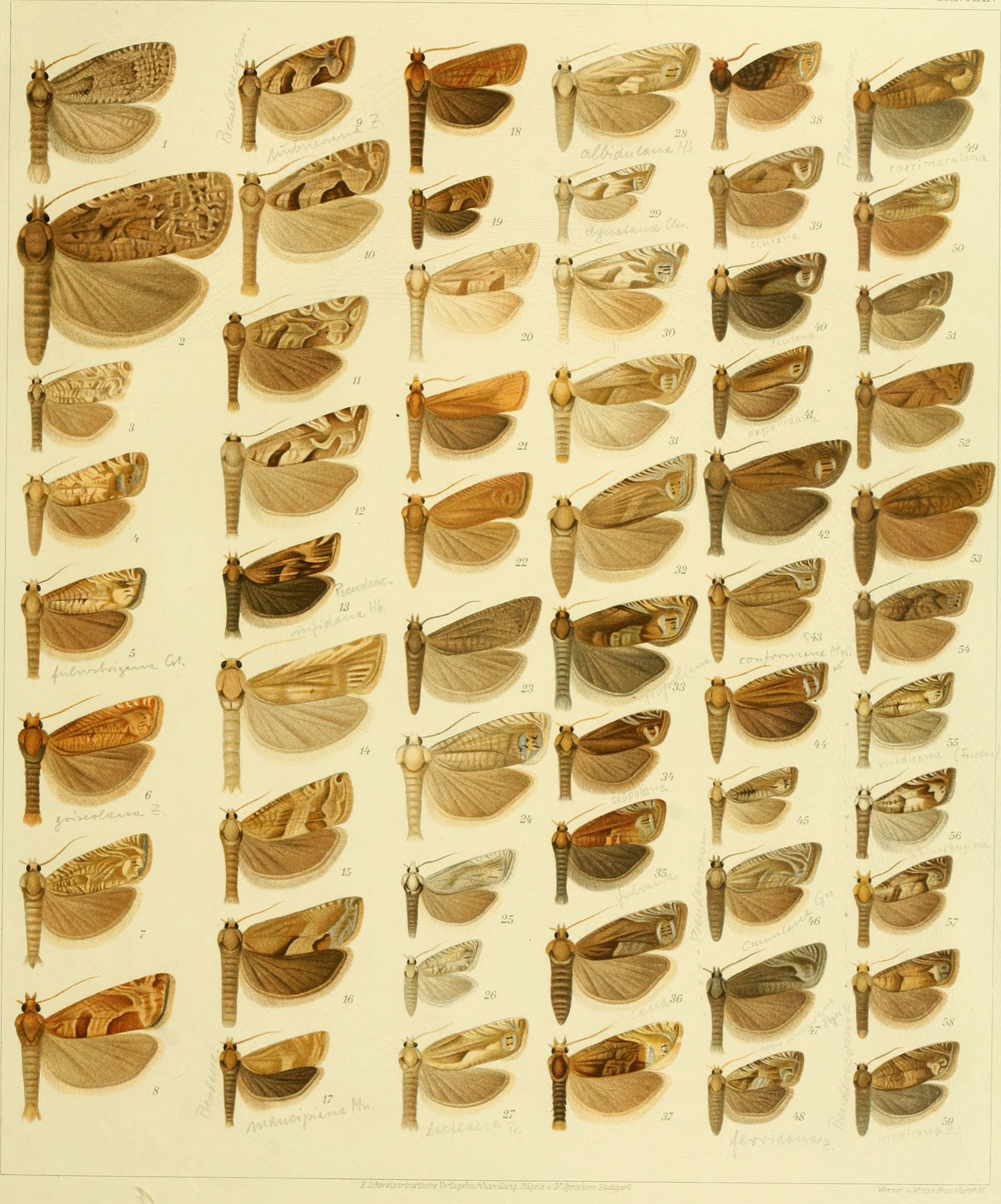
- Fig. 35 male

Scientific classification
- Kingdom: Animalia
- Phylum: Arthropoda
- Clade: Pancrustacea
- Class: Insecta
- Order: Lepidoptera
- Family: Tortricidae
- Genus: Eucosma
- Species: E. fulvana

Binomial name
- Eucosma fulvana Stephens, 1834

= Eucosma fulvana =

Species of moth

Eucosma fulvana is a species of moth, belonging to the genus Eucosma.

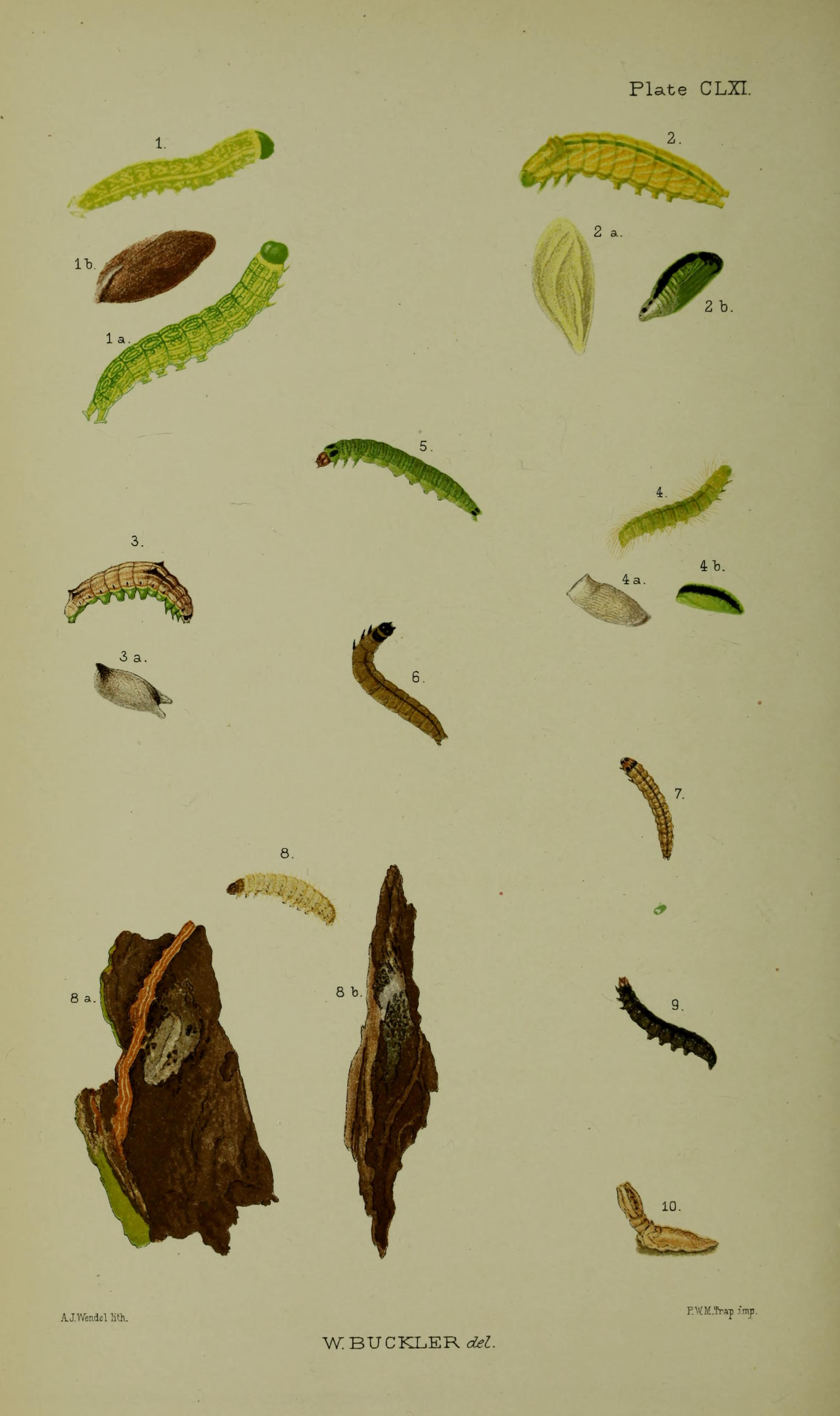
Figs. 6 larva after final moult

It is native to Europe. where it has a limited distribution (from Great Britain, Germany, Estonia and the Nordic countries except Iceland). Julius von Kennel provides a full description. The larvae feed on the flower heads of Centaurea spp.
