= Agonopterix vendettella =

Scientific classification
- Kingdom: Animalia
- Phylum: Arthropoda
- Clade: Pancrustacea
- Class: Insecta
- Order: Lepidoptera
- Family: Depressariidae
- Genus: Agonopterix
- Species: A. vendettella

Binomial name
- Agonopterix vendettella (Chretien, 1908)

Synonyms
- Depressaria vendettella Chretien, 1908; Agonopterix kotalella Amsel, 1972

Species of moth

Agonopterix vendettella is a moth of the family Depressariidae. It is found in France and Portugal and on Corsica and the Canary Islands.

The wingspan is 18–21 mm.

The larvae feed on Smyrnium olusatrum.
