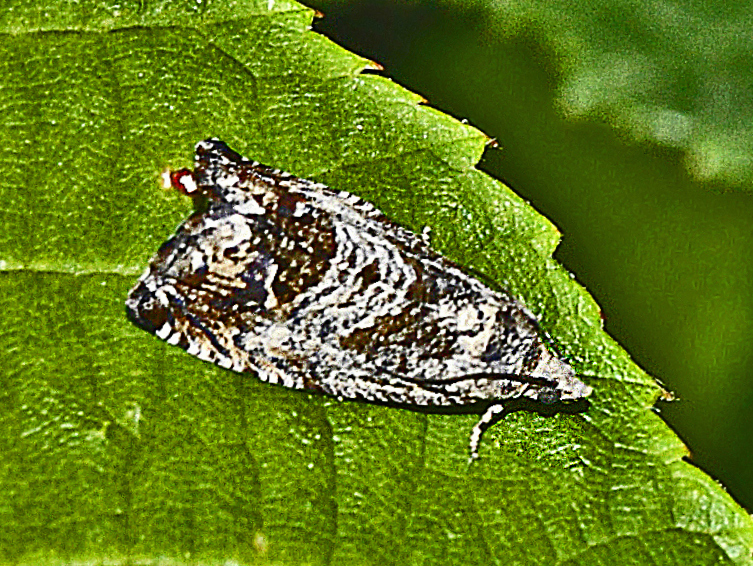
- Adult of Cydia fagiglandana

Scientific classification
- Kingdom: Animalia
- Phylum: Arthropoda
- Clade: Pancrustacea
- Class: Insecta
- Order: Lepidoptera
- Family: Tortricidae
- Genus: Cydia
- Species: C. fagiglandana

Binomial name
- Cydia fagiglandana (Zeller, 1841)

Synonyms
- Kenneliola fagiglandana Zeller, 1841; Cydia grossana Haworth, 1811; Tortrix fagiglandana Zeller, 1841; Cydia fagiglandana corsica Gibeaux, 1999; Tortrix grossana Haworth, [1811]; Cydia fagiglandana subsp. corsica Gibeaux, 1999; Cydia nimbana Pierce & Metcalfe, 1922

= Cydia fagiglandana =

Beech moth

Species of moth

Cydia fagiglandana, the beech moth, is a moth of the family Tortricidae.

== Distribution and habitat ==
This species is present in most of Europe. These moths mainly occur in beech woodland since it is a specialist with beech seeds as the major food of its larvae.

== Description ==
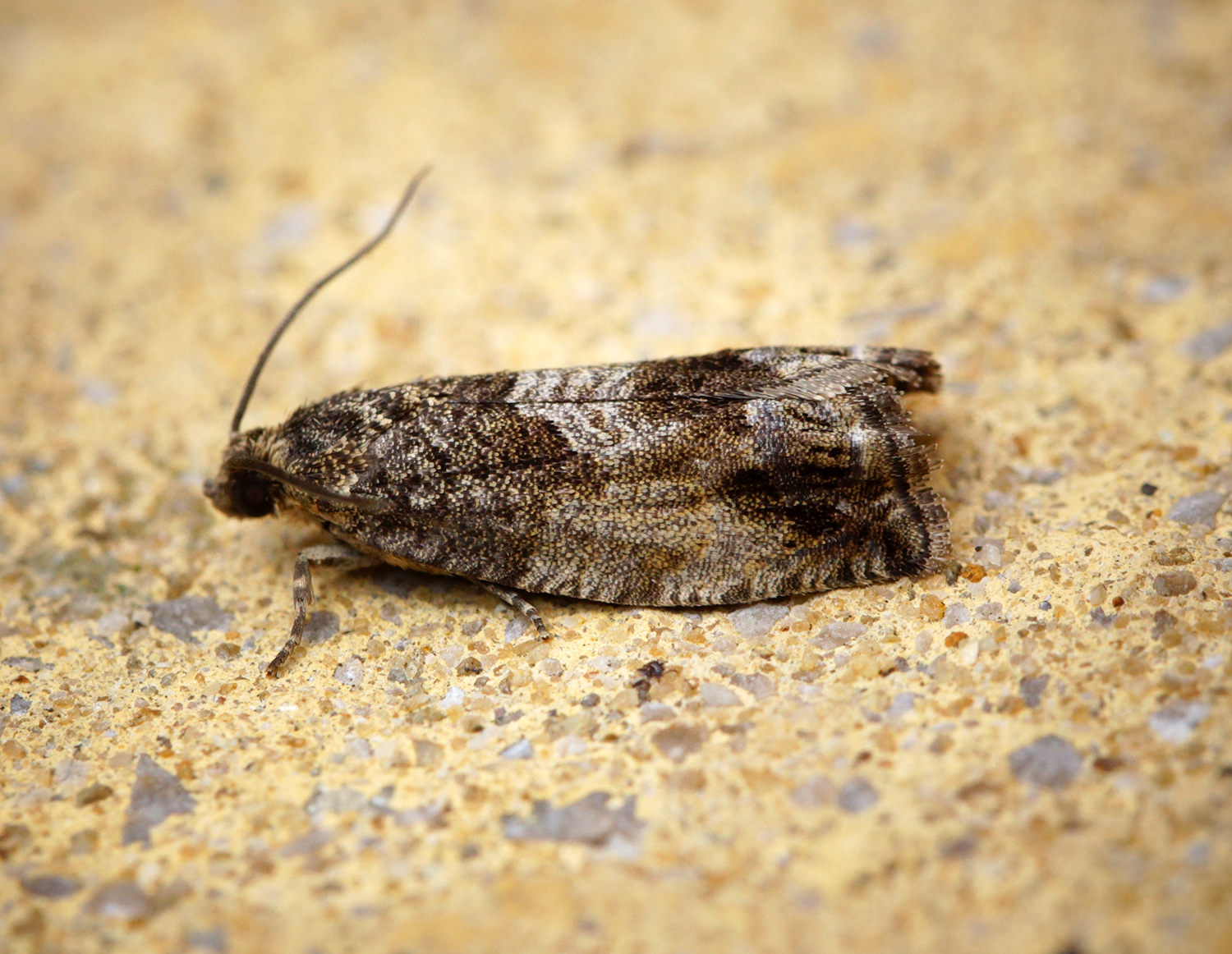
Side view

Cydia fagiglandana can reach a wingspan of 12–16 mm. The forewings are brown-black irrorated with whitish, crossed by pairs of fine dark brown stripes. The basal patch is slightly darker, the edge sharply angulated. There are two leaden-metallic streaks from costa posteriorly and a large darker coppery-tinged terminal patch hardly reaching costa. The ocellus within this patch is edged with leaden-metallic, enclosing some blackish marks. The hindwings are fuscous. The larvae are light yellowish or whitish, longitudinally clouded with orange; spots orange; head pale brownish; plate of 2 pale ochreous. This species is rather similar to Cydia splendana.

== Biology ==
The moth flies from April to September depending on the location. They are active in the evening. The larvae feed sometimes on oak (Quercus ilex, Quercus robur), but usually on beech nuts (Fagus sylvatica). The larval stage may last for two years. Pupation usually occurs in a cocoon spun in the soil or in rotten wood. The first adults emerge in late spring.
