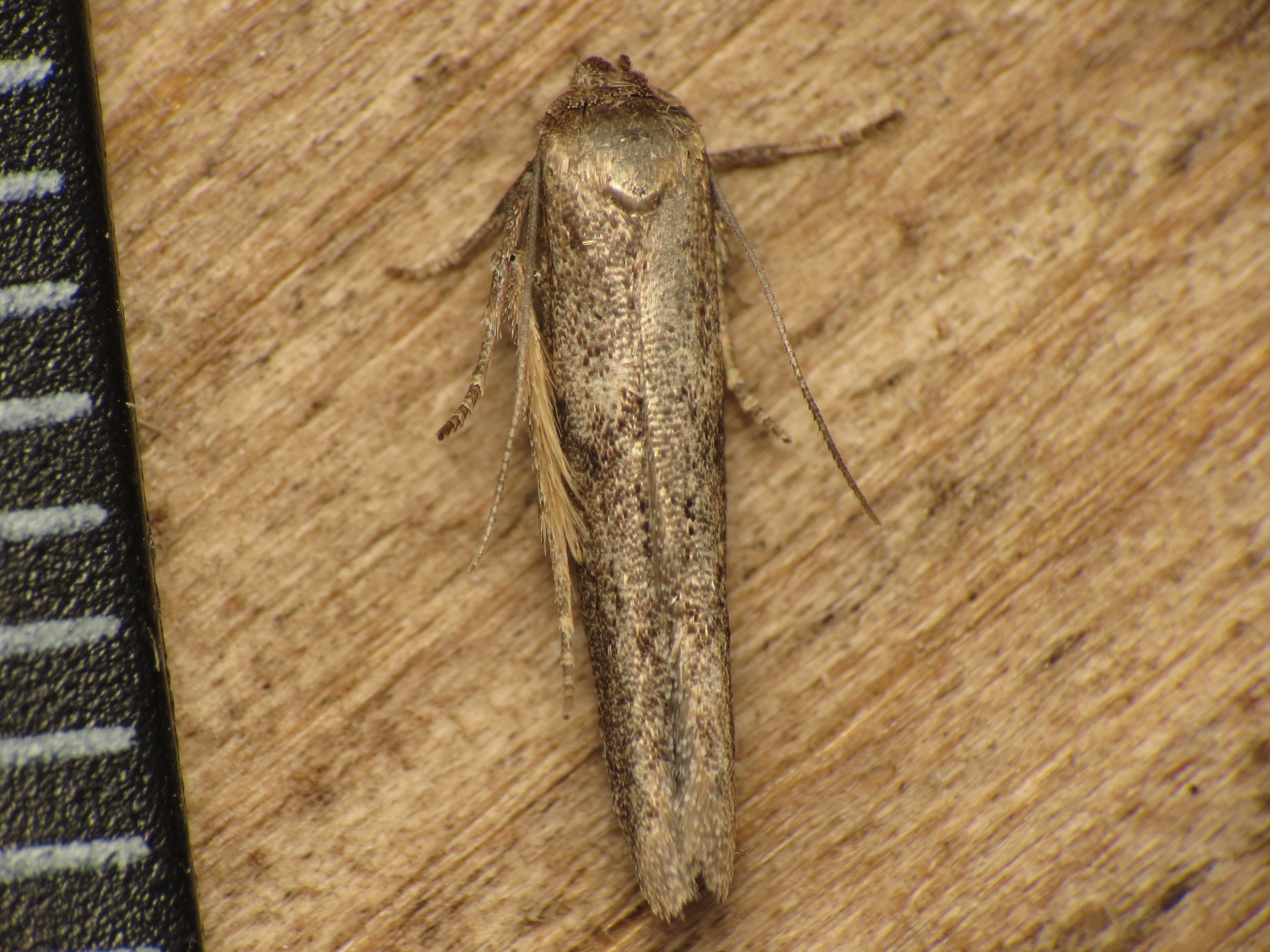

Scientific classification
- Kingdom: Animalia
- Phylum: Arthropoda
- Clade: Pancrustacea
- Class: Insecta
- Order: Lepidoptera
- Family: Blastobasidae
- Genus: Blastobasis
- Species: B. phycidella

Binomial name
- Blastobasis phycidella (Zeller, 1839)

Synonyms
- List: Oecophora phycidella Zeller, 1839; Oecophora roscidella Zeller, 1847; Blastobasis roscidella

= Blastobasis phycidella =

Species of moth

Blastobasis phycidella is a moth in the family Blastobasidae. It is found in most of Europe (except Fennoscandia, Latvia, Estonia, Ireland and Iceland).

The wingspan is 17–19 mm. There is probably one generation per year with adults on wing from the end of June to the beginning of early August.

The larvae feed on decomposing wood of oak (Quercus species), fallen pine needles and dried fungus.
