= Dysspastus lilliput =

Scientific classification
- Kingdom: Animalia
- Phylum: Arthropoda
- Clade: Pancrustacea
- Class: Insecta
- Order: Lepidoptera
- Family: Autostichidae
- Genus: Dysspastus
- Species: D. lilliput

Binomial name
- Dysspastus lilliput Gozmány, 1996

Species of moth

Dysspastus lilliput is a moth of the family Autostichidae. It is found on Malta in the Mediterranean Sea.
