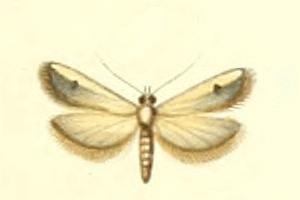

Scientific classification
- Kingdom: Animalia
- Phylum: Arthropoda
- Clade: Pancrustacea
- Class: Insecta
- Order: Lepidoptera
- Family: Pyralidae
- Genus: Metallostichodes
- Species: M. nigrocyanella

Binomial name
- Metallostichodes nigrocyanella (Constant, 1865)

Synonyms
- Myelois nigrocyanella Constant, 1865; Myelois chalcocyanella Wocke, 1871; Metallostichodes nigrocyanella reisserella Roesler, 1969

= Metallostichodes nigrocyanella =

Species of moth

Metallostichodes nigrocyanella is a species of snout moth. It is found in France, Spain, Portugal, Italy, Croatia, Greece and on Cyprus, as well as in Turkey.

The wingspan is about 13 mm.
