= Arnia nervosalis =

Scientific classification
- Kingdom: Animalia
- Phylum: Arthropoda
- Class: Insecta
- Order: Lepidoptera
- Family: Crambidae
- Genus: Arnia Guenée, 1849
- Species: A. nervosalis

Binomial name
- Arnia nervosalis Guenée, 1849

Synonyms
- Arnia nervosalis hyrcanalis Amsel, 1961; Stenia nervosalis ab. pygmaealis Amsel, 1935

Species of moth

Arnia is a genus of moths of the family Crambidae. It contains only one species, Arnia nervosalis, which is found in southern Europe (France, Spain, Portugal and on Corsica, Sardinia and Sicily), in North Africa (Algeria and Morocco), and in the Middle East (Jordania, Iran, and Oman).
