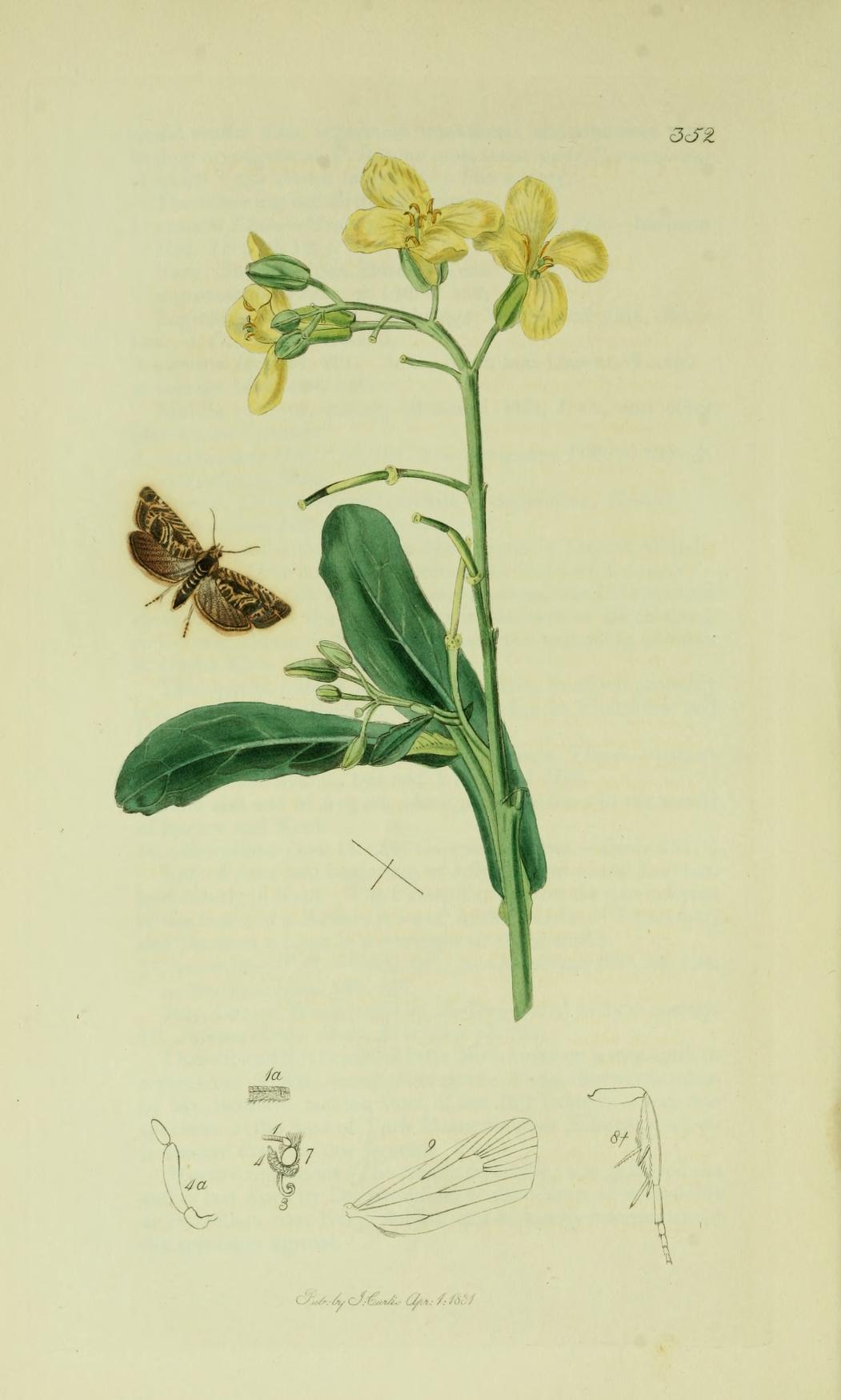
- Illustration from John Curtis's British Entomology Volume 6

Scientific classification
- Kingdom: Animalia
- Phylum: Arthropoda
- Class: Insecta
- Order: Lepidoptera
- Family: Tortricidae
- Genus: Selania
- Species: S. leplastriana

Binomial name
- Selania leplastriana (Curtis, 1831)

Synonyms
- Carpocapsa leplastriana Curtis, 1831; Stigmonota cariosana Barrett, 1873; Grapholitha decoratana Chrtien, 1915; Grapholitha extinctana Chrtien, 1915; Ephippiphora gueriniana Duponchel, in Godart, 1836; Ephippiphora maderae Wollaston, 1858; Eucelis malcolmiae Walsingham, 1903; Grapholitha vana Kennel, 1901

= Selania leplastriana =

Species of moth

Selania leplastriana, the Leplastrier's piercer, is a moth of the family Tortricidae. It is found in most of southern Europe except the Balkan Peninsula. It is also found in the Near East and North Africa.

The wingspan is about 13 mm. Adults are on wing in July. They are day flyers.
