= Epidola melitensis =

Scientific classification
- Domain: Eukaryota
- Kingdom: Animalia
- Phylum: Arthropoda
- Class: Insecta
- Order: Lepidoptera
- Family: Gelechiidae
- Genus: Epidola
- Species: E. melitensis

Binomial name
- Epidola melitensis Amsel, [1955]

Species of moth

Epidola melitensis is a moth of the family Gelechiidae. It was described by Hans Georg Amsel in 1955. It is found on Malta.
