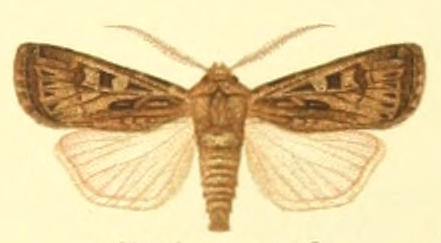

Scientific classification
- Domain: Eukaryota
- Kingdom: Animalia
- Phylum: Arthropoda
- Class: Insecta
- Order: Lepidoptera
- Superfamily: Noctuoidea
- Family: Noctuidae
- Genus: Euxoa
- Species: E. distinguenda

Binomial name
- Euxoa distinguenda (Lederer, 1857)

Synonyms
- Agrotis distinguenda Lederer, 1857

= Euxoa distinguenda =

Species of moth

Euxoa distinguenda is a moth of the family Noctuidae. It is found in central, southern and eastern Europe, Turkey, Lebanon, Israel, Jordan and western Asia.

== Description ==
Warren states E. distinguenda Led. (= aquilina Bsd. non Hbn., hastifera Donz. fig. 2 only) (5f). Exceedingly like aquilina, but the male has the antennae clothed with long fascicles of cilia; claviform stigma large, outlined in black: hindwing white. Found in S. France. Switzerland and Hungary: originally recorded from the Altai Mts. in W. Siberia.

== Subspecies ==
- Euxoa distinguenda distinguenda (Alps)
- Euxoa distinguenda distincta (eastern Europe, Levant)

== Biology ==
Adults are on wing from September to October. There is one generation per year.

The larvae feed on various herbaceous plants.
