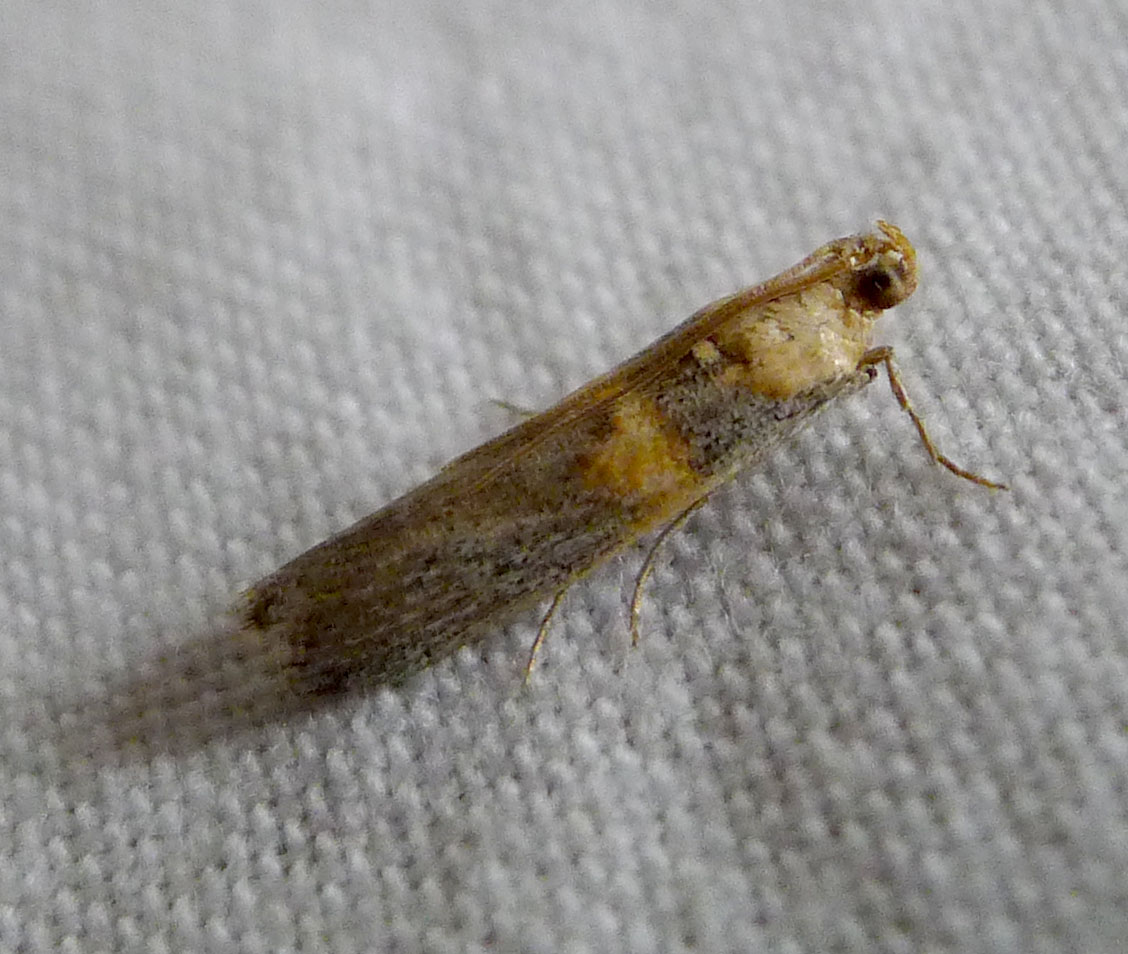

Scientific classification
- Domain: Eukaryota
- Kingdom: Animalia
- Phylum: Arthropoda
- Class: Insecta
- Order: Lepidoptera
- Family: Pyralidae
- Genus: Oxybia; Rebel, 1901
- Species: O. transversella

Binomial name
- Oxybia transversella (Duponchel, 1836)

Synonyms
- List (Genus): Oxybia Hampson in Ragonot, 1901; (Species): Phycis transversella Duponchel, 1836; Myelois bituminella Millière, 1873; Oxybia panormitanella Caradja, 1928

= Oxybia =

Oxybia transversella

Genus of moths

Oxybia is a monotypic snout moth genus described by Hans Rebel in 1901. Its only species, Oxybia transversella, was described by Philogène Auguste Joseph Duponchel in 1836. It is found in southern Europe and on the Canary Islands.

Specimens from Fuerteventura are different.

The larvae feed on Psoralea bituminosa.
