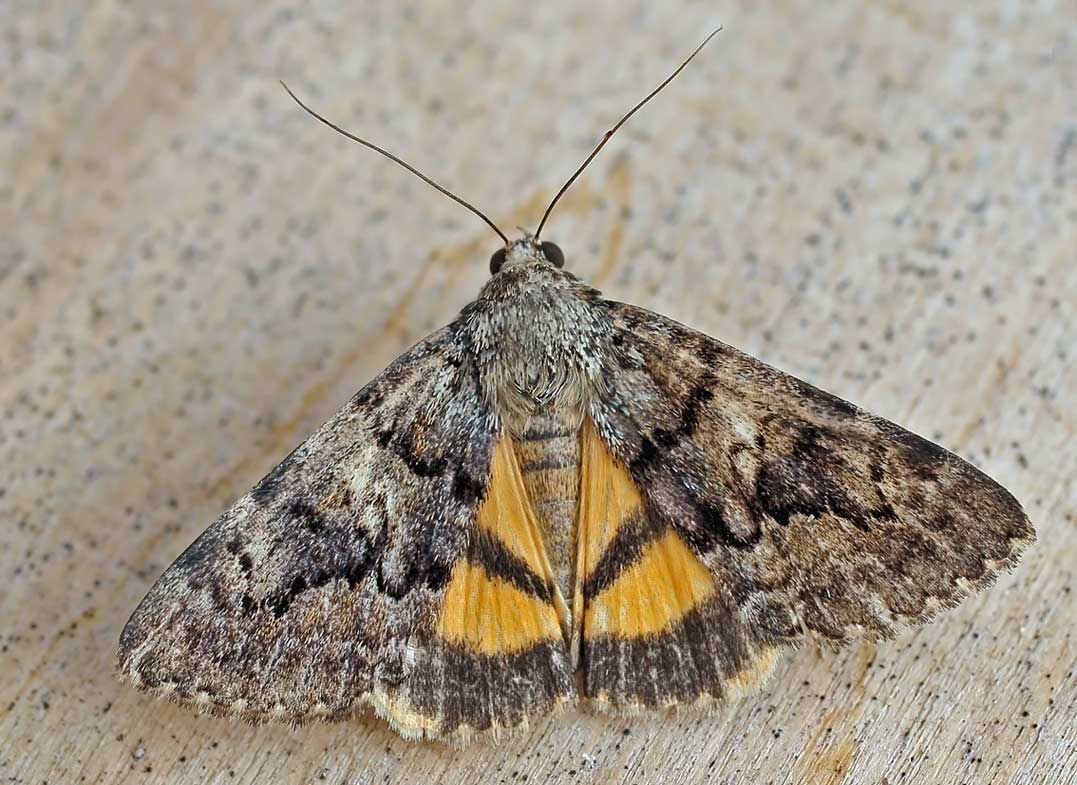

Scientific classification
- Kingdom: Animalia
- Phylum: Arthropoda
- Class: Insecta
- Order: Lepidoptera
- Superfamily: Noctuoidea
- Family: Erebidae
- Genus: Catocala
- Species: C. nymphaea

Binomial name
- Catocala nymphaea (Esper, 1787)

Synonyms
- Noctua nymphaea Esper, 1787; Ephesia nymphaea; Noctua vestalis Geyer, [1835]; Catocala conjux Freyer, 1850; Ephesia nymphaea kashmirica Warren, 1913; Ephasia nymphaea kabuli O. Bang-Haas, 1927; Ephesia nymphaea parigilensis Kardakoff, 1937; Catocala vestalis Boisduval, 1829

= Catocala nymphaea =

Species of moth

Catocala nymphaea is a species of moth of the family Erebidae. It was described by Eugenius Johann Christoph Esper in 1787. It is found in southern France, Austria, Albania, Portugal, Croatia, Italy, Greece, Corsica, Sicily, Crete, North Africa, Anatolia, Afghanistan and Kashmir.

The wingspan is 54–62 millimetres (2.1–2.4 in). Adults are on wing from July to August depending on the location.

The larvae feed on Quercus ilex.

== Subspecies ==
- Catocala nymphaea nymphaea
- Catocala nymphaea kabuli (O. Bang-Haas, 1927) (Afghanistan)
- Catocala nymphaea kashmirica (Warren, 1913) (Kashmir)
- Catocala nymphaea parigilensis (Kardakoff, 1937)
