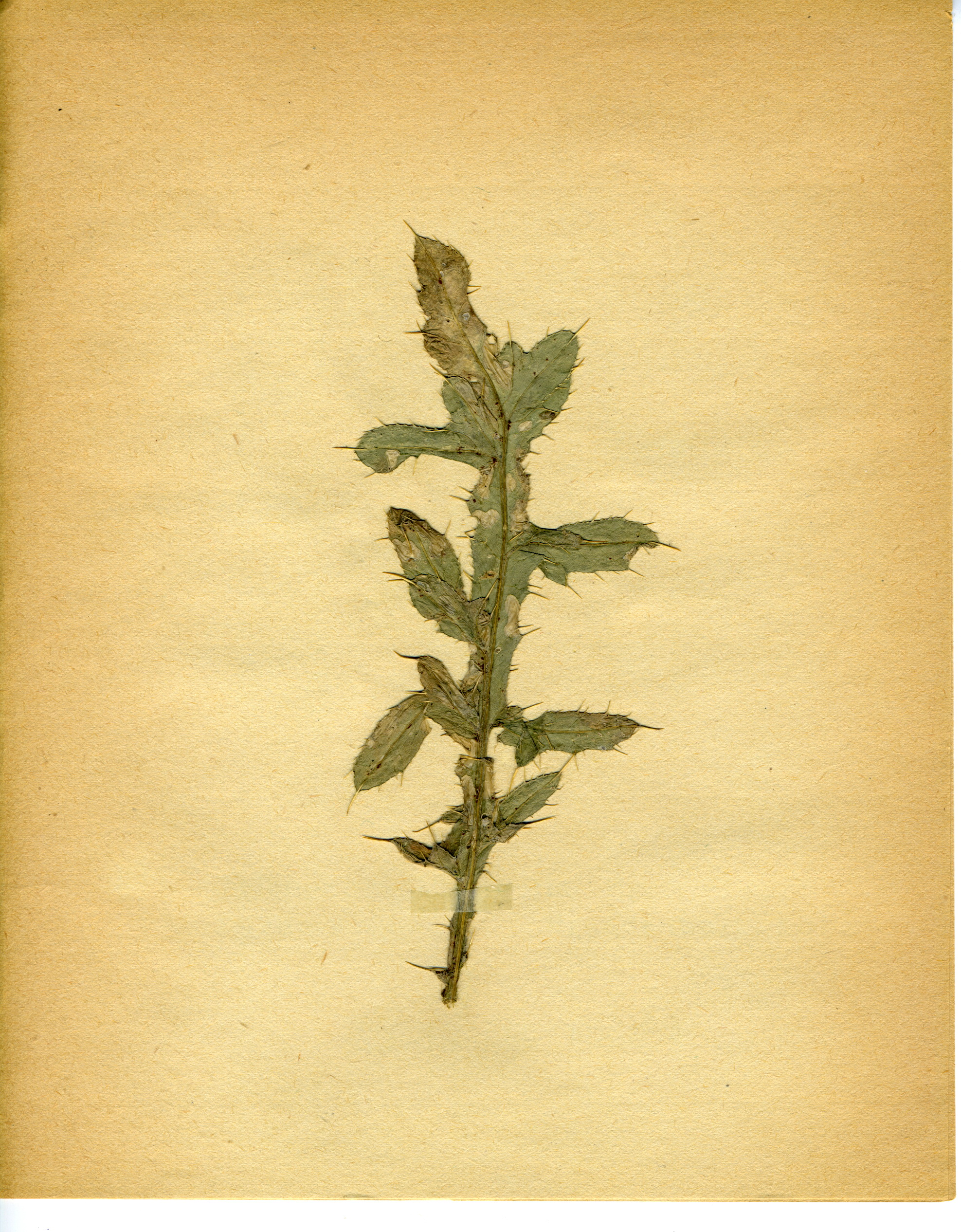
- Host plant with marks images of imago

Scientific classification
- Kingdom: Animalia
- Phylum: Arthropoda
- Class: Insecta
- Order: Lepidoptera
- Family: Coleophoridae
- Genus: Coleophora
- Species: C. therinella

Binomial name
- Coleophora therinella Tengström, 1848

Synonyms
- Ecebalia therinella

= Coleophora therinella =

Species of moth

Coleophora therinella is a moth of the family Coleophoridae found in Europe and the East Palearctic.

== Description ==
The wingspan is 13–16 mm. Coleophora species have narrow blunt to pointed forewings and a weakly defined tornus. The hindwings are narrow-elongate and very long-fringed. The upper surfaces have neither a discal spot nor transverse lines. Each abdomen segment of the abdomen has paired patches of tiny spines which show through the scales. The resting position is horizontal with the front end raised and the cilia give the hind tip a frayed and upturned look if the wings are rolled around the body. C. therinella characteristics include head whitish-ochreous, sides whitish. Antennae white, tinged with fuscous, basal joint loosely haired. Forewings narrower than in C. troglodytella, brownish-ochreous; white streaks as in C. troglodytella, but more indistinct. Hindwings grey. Only reliably identified by dissection and microscopic examination of the genitalia.

Adults are on wing from June to August.

The larvae feed on Carlina, Carduus and Cirsium species. The larvae feed on the seeds of their host plant, living in a portable case.

== Distribution ==
The moth is found in most of Europe, Russia, central Asia and Japan, occurring in steppe biotopes and in anthropogenic areas.
