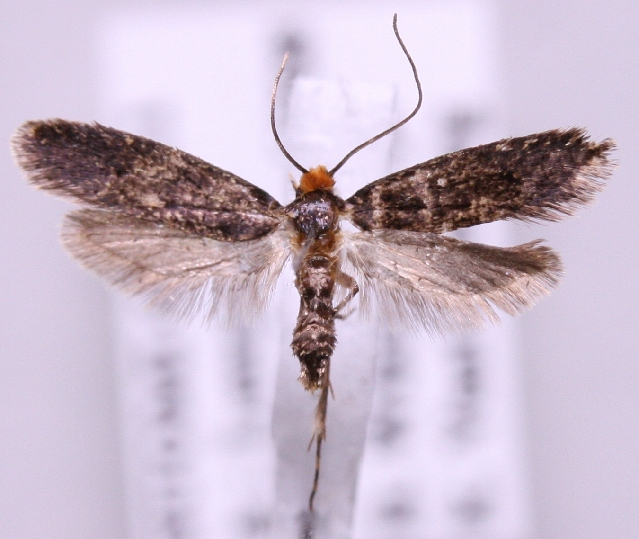

Scientific classification
- Kingdom: Animalia
- Phylum: Arthropoda
- Class: Insecta
- Order: Lepidoptera
- Family: Tineidae
- Genus: Niditinea
- Species: N. truncicolella

Binomial name
- Niditinea truncicolella (Tengstrom, 1848)

Synonyms
- Tinea truncicolella Tengström, 1848; Tinea rosenbergerella Nolcken, 1871; Niditinea rosenbergerella

= Niditinea truncicolella =

Species of moth

Niditinea truncicolella is a moth of the family Tineidae. It was described by Johan Martin Jakob von Tengström in 1848. It is found in Spain, Germany, Switzerland, the Czech Republic, Slovakia, Estonia, Latvia, Norway, Sweden, Finland and Russia.

The wingspan is 9–13 mm. Adults have been recorded on wing from June to July.
