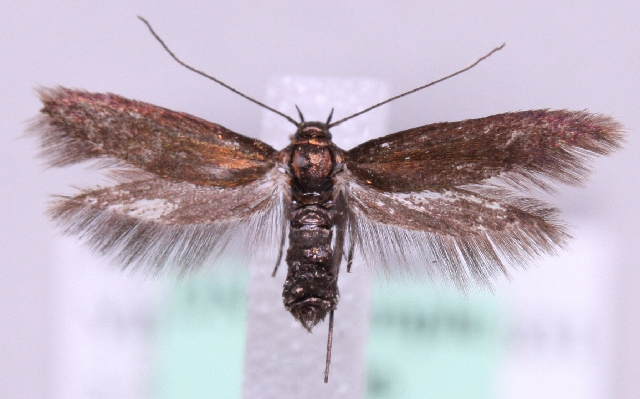

Scientific classification
- Kingdom: Animalia
- Phylum: Arthropoda
- Class: Insecta
- Order: Lepidoptera
- Family: Scythrididae
- Genus: Scythris
- Species: S. disparella

Binomial name
- Scythris disparella (Tengstrom, 1848)

Synonyms
- Oecophora disparella Tengström, 1848

= Scythris disparella =

Species of moth

Scythris disparella is a moth of the family Scythrididae. It was described by Johan Martin Jakob von Tengström in 1848. It is found from Europe (where it is found in Scandinavia, Latvia, Estonia, Belarus, Ukraine, Moldova, North Macedonia, Bosnia and Herzegovina, Croatia, Slovakia, the Czech Republic, Austria, Germany, France and Spain) to the southern Urals.

The wingspan is 10–12 mm. Adults are on wing from May to July.
