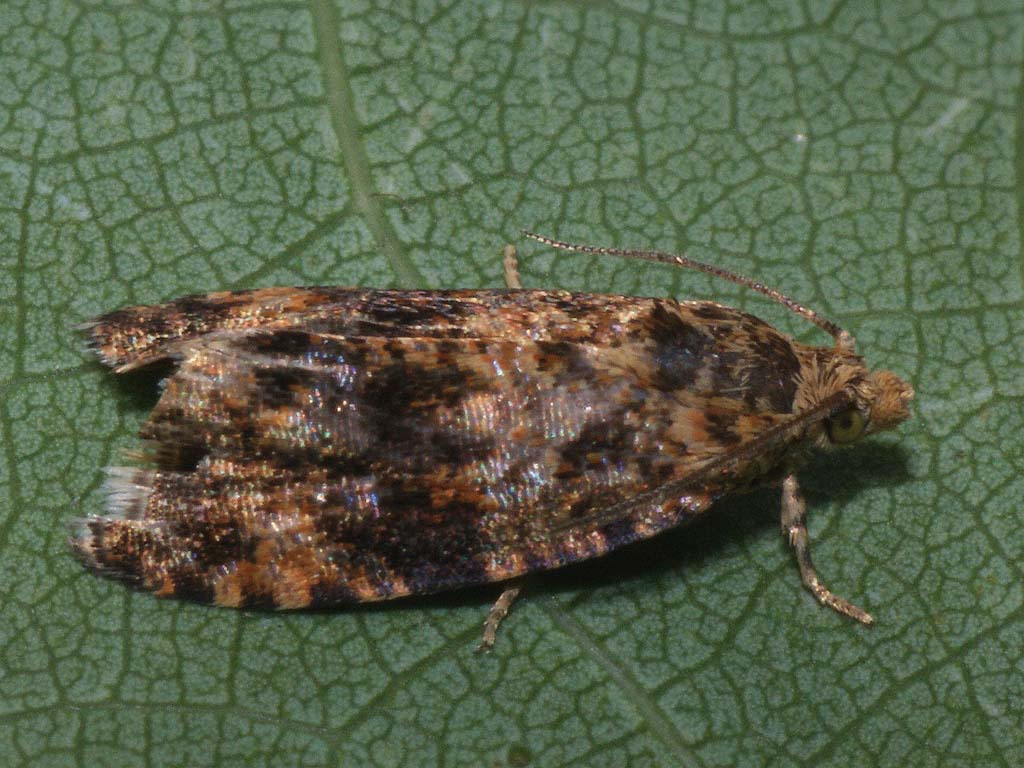

Scientific classification
- Kingdom: Animalia
- Phylum: Arthropoda
- Class: Insecta
- Order: Lepidoptera
- Family: Tortricidae
- Genus: Selenodes
- Species: S. karelica

Binomial name
- Selenodes karelica Tengström, 1875.

Synonyms
- Selenodes karelicus (Tengström, 1875)

= Selenodes karelica =

Species of moth

Selenodes karelica is a moth belonging to the family Tortricidae.

The species was described in 1875 by Johan Martin Jakob von Tengström as Penthina karelica.

It is native to Europe.
