= Caradrina petraea =

Scientific classification
- Kingdom: Animalia
- Phylum: Arthropoda
- Class: Insecta
- Order: Lepidoptera
- Superfamily: Noctuoidea
- Family: Noctuidae
- Genus: Caradrina
- Species: C. petraea

Binomial name
- Caradrina petraea Tengström, 1869

Species of moth

Caradrina petraea is a moth belonging to the family Noctuidae. The species was first described by Johan Martin Jakob von Tengström in 1869.

It is native to Eastern Europe.
