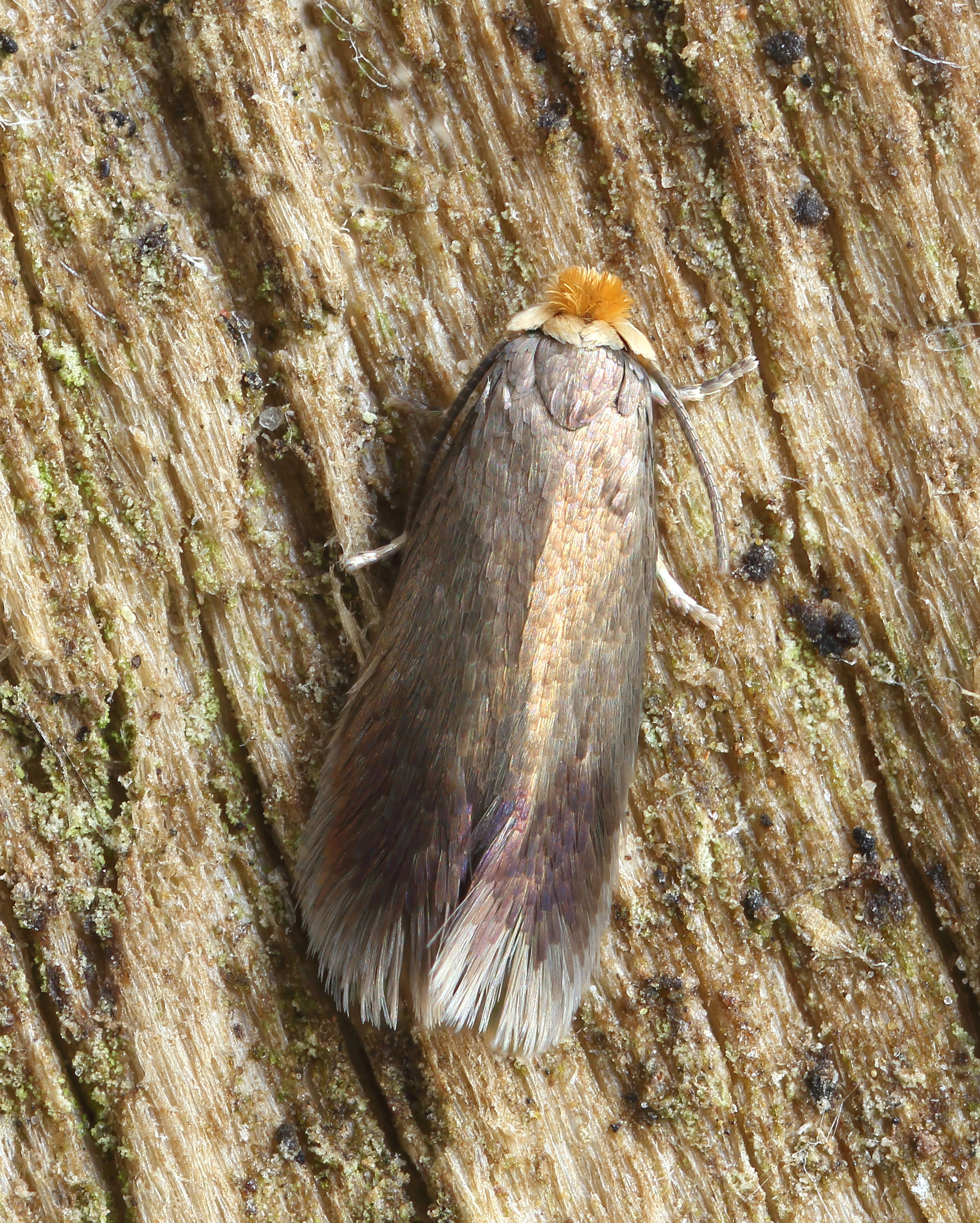

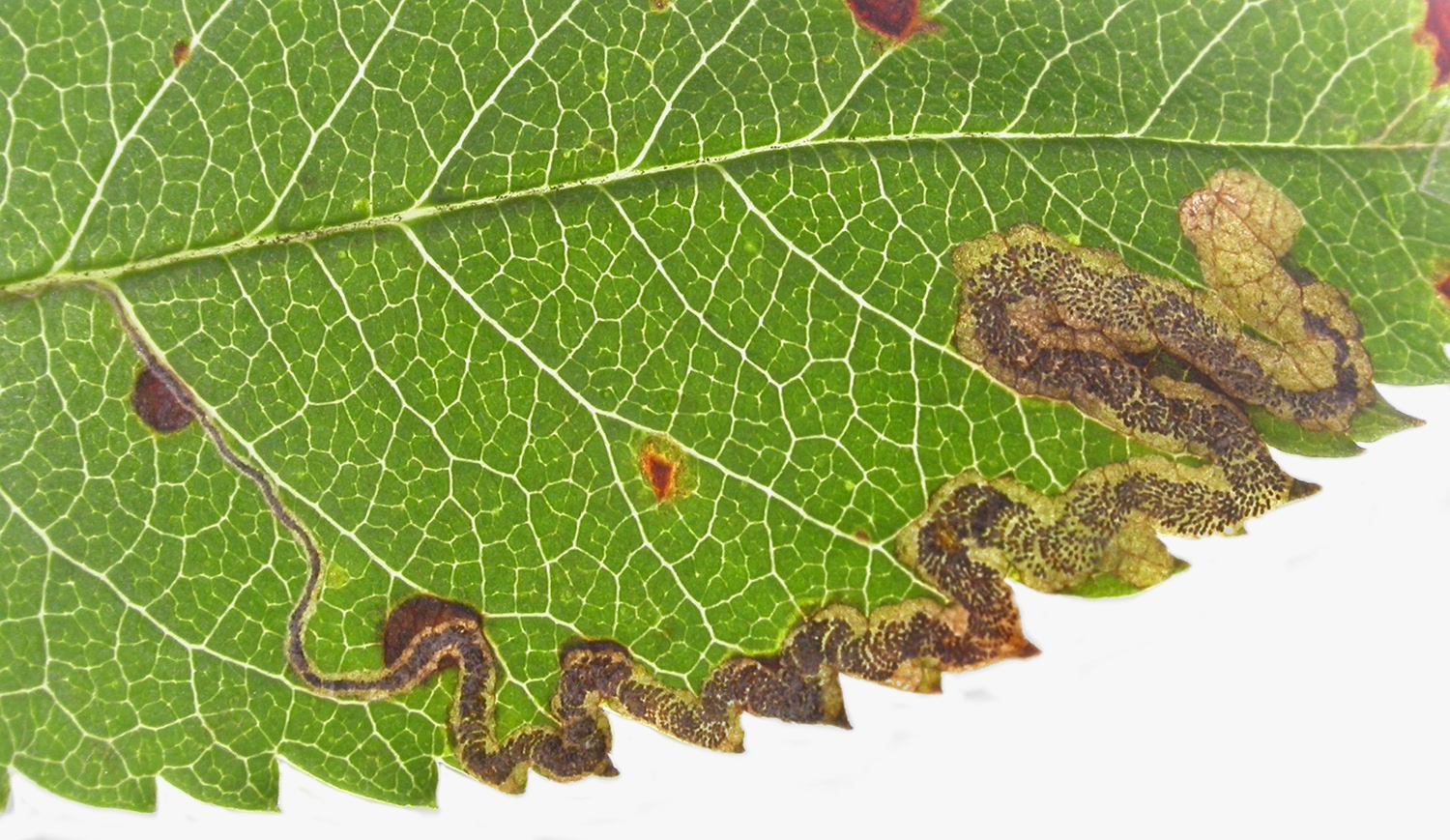

Scientific classification
- Kingdom: Animalia
- Phylum: Arthropoda
- Class: Insecta
- Order: Lepidoptera
- Family: Nepticulidae
- Genus: Stigmella
- Species: S. nylandriella

Binomial name
- Stigmella nylandriella (Tengström, 1848)

Synonyms
- Lyonetia nylandriella Tengström, 1848; Nepticula aucupariae Frey, 1857

= Stigmella nylandriella =

Species of moth

Stigmella nylandriella is a moth of the family Nepticulidae. It is found in all of Europe (except the Iberian Peninsula and the Balkan Peninsula), east to Russia, where it has been recorded from Bryansk, Murmansk, Karelia, Leningrad and Voronezh.

The wingspan is 4–5 mm. The head is ferruginous yellowish to brown, the collar whitish. The antennal eyecaps are whitish. The forewings are light shining ochreous-grey, the apex somewhat darker. The hindwings are pale grey.

Adults are on wing in May and June.

The larvae feed on Sorbus aria, Sorbus aucuparia and Sorbus domestica. They mine the leaves of their host plant.

== Etymology ==
The name honours William Nylander.
