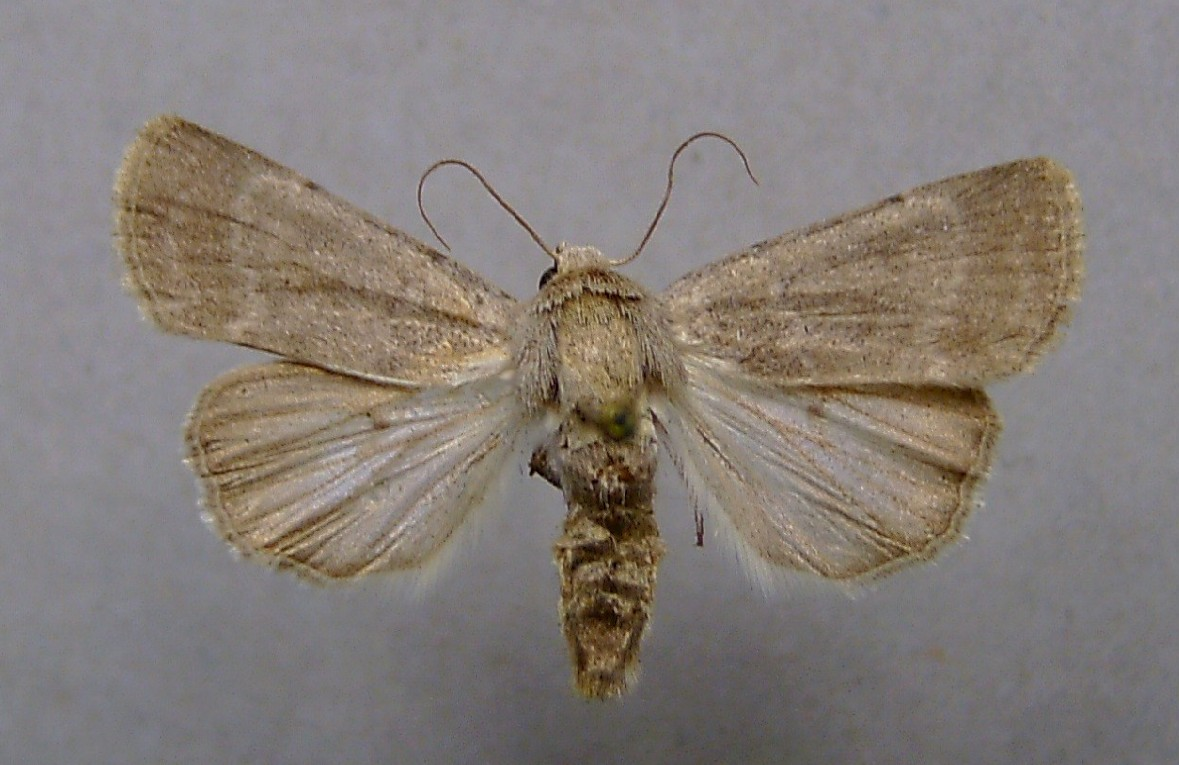

Scientific classification
- Kingdom: Animalia
- Phylum: Arthropoda
- Class: Insecta
- Order: Lepidoptera
- Superfamily: Noctuoidea
- Family: Noctuidae
- Genus: Caradrina
- Species: C. gilva

Binomial name
- Caradrina gilva (Donzel, 1837)

Synonyms
- Eremodrina gilva; Agrotis gilva

= Caradrina gilva =

Species of moth

Caradrina gilva is a moth of the family Noctuidae. It is endemic to southern Central Europe.The eastern distribution extends to the Middle East up to Turkey. In the Alps it reaches heights of about 1600 meters. Isolated records in other regions indicate that the species is sometimes migratory and it has recently been expanding its range. The first sighting in Spain was in 2007 and in The Netherlands June 1, 2009 in Geulle.The main habitat is warm, rocky mountain slopes, occasionally also grassy areas.

== Subspecies ==
There are two recognised subspecies:

- Caradrina gilva gilva
- Caradrina gilva orientalis
