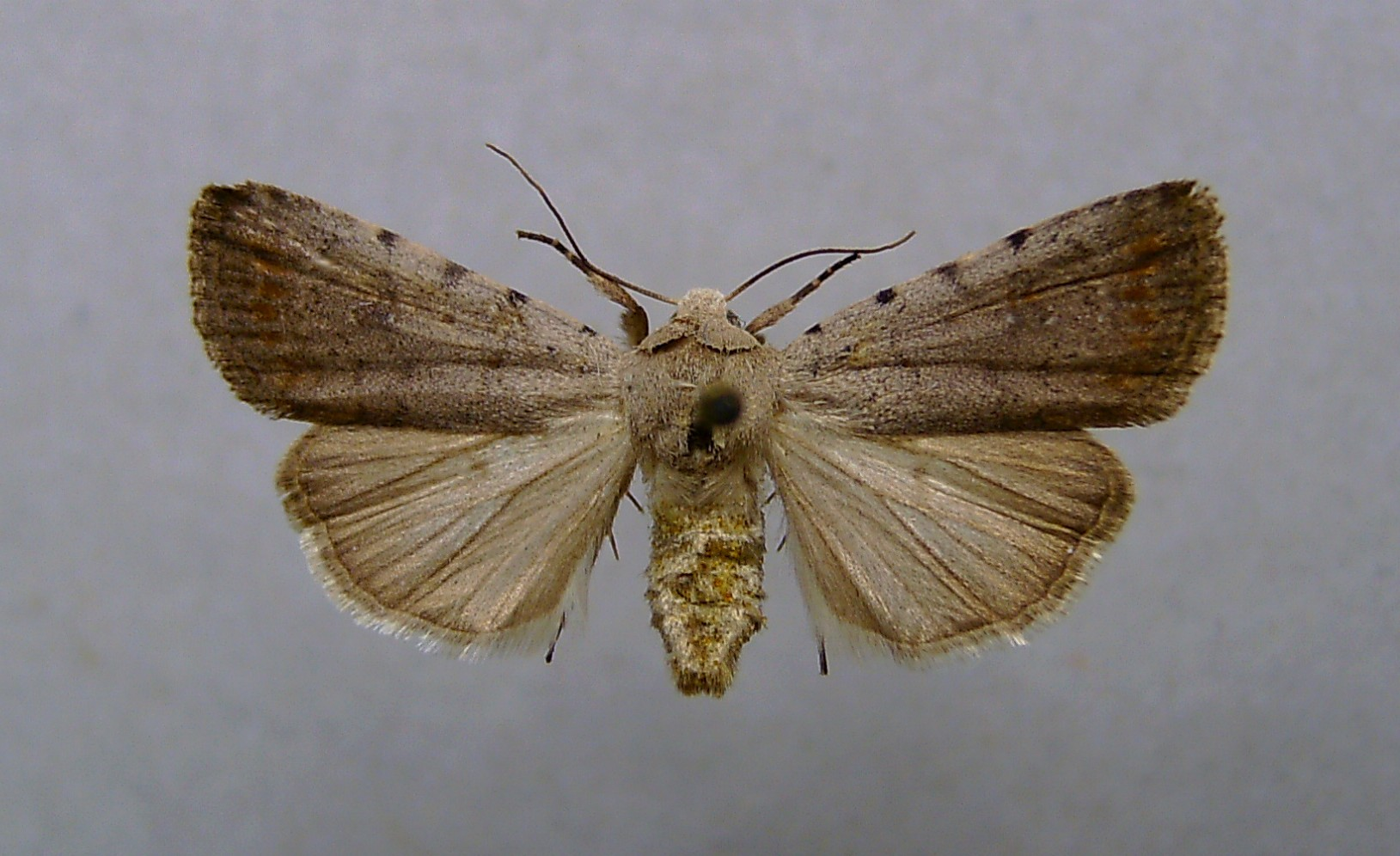

Scientific classification
- Kingdom: Animalia
- Phylum: Arthropoda
- Class: Insecta
- Order: Lepidoptera
- Superfamily: Noctuoidea
- Family: Noctuidae
- Genus: Caradrina
- Species: C. selini

Binomial name
- Caradrina selini Boisduval, [1840]

Synonyms
- Paradrina selini; Noctua (Charadrina) milleri Schultz, 1862; Caradrina jurrassica Riggenbach-Stehlin, 1876; Athetis telekii Diószeghy, [1935]; Athetis selini f. puengeleri Draudt, 1934; Caradrina selinoides Bellier, 1862; Caradrina (Paradrina) selini djebli Rungs, 1972; Elaphria (Paradrina) forsteri Boursin, 1939; Elaphria (Paradrina) forsteri Boursin, 1940; Caradrina seleni var. mairei Draudt, 1909

= Caradrina selini =

Species of moth

Caradrina selini is a moth of the family Noctuidae. It was described by Jean Baptiste Boisduval in 1840. It is found in most of Europe, North Africa and the Near East.

The wingspan is 25–29 mm for males and 25–30 mm for females. Adults have been recorded on wing from May to August.

The upper side of the forewing has a blue-gray to ash-gray or brown-gray base color. Several dark spots stand out clearly against the slightly lighter front edge. The reniform spot is usually indistinct, and the annular spot is reduced to a black dot. The transverse lines are dark but usually indistinct. The upper side of the hind wings has no markings and is whitish in color, darkening slightly towards the edge.

The larvae feed on various low-growing plants, including Plantago, Rumex and Taraxacum species.

== Subspecies ==
- Caradrina selini selini (south-western Europe, Fennoscandia, Corsica, Sardinia, Italy, the Alps, Germany, the Balkan Peninsula, Crete)
- Caradrina selini djebli Rungs, 1972 (Morocco, Algeria, Malta)
- Caradrina selini forsteri (Boursin, 1939) (northern Iran)
- Caradrina selini mairei Draudt, 1909 (Egypt)
- Caradrina selini selinoides Bellier, 1862 (Corsica)
