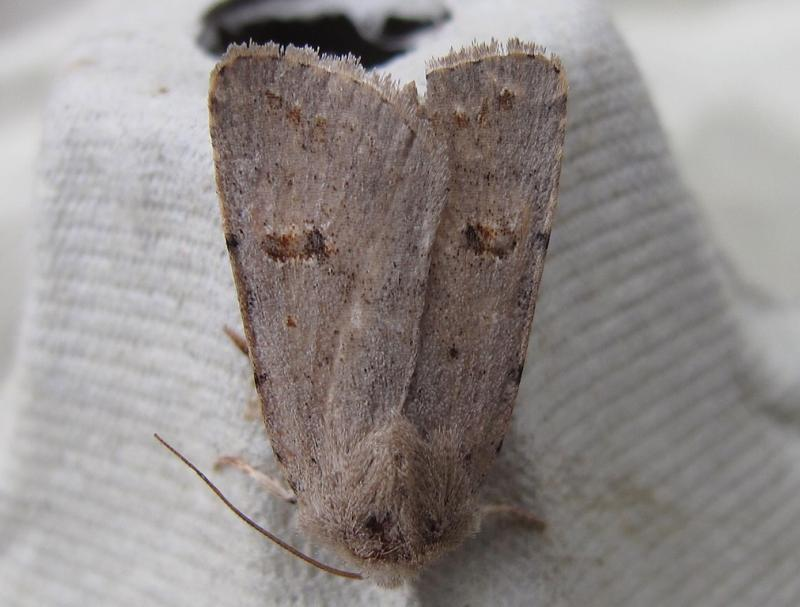

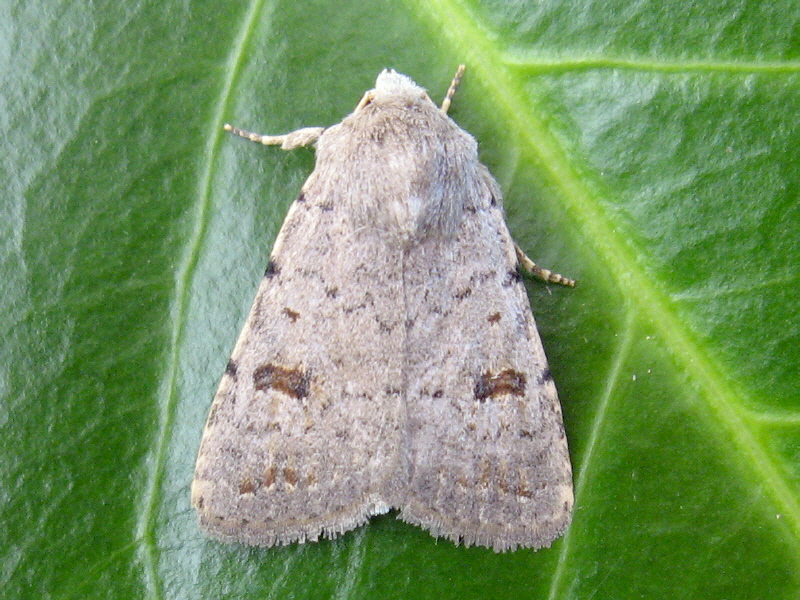

Scientific classification
- Domain: Eukaryota
- Kingdom: Animalia
- Phylum: Arthropoda
- Class: Insecta
- Order: Lepidoptera
- Superfamily: Noctuoidea
- Family: Noctuidae
- Genus: Caradrina
- Species: C. kadenii

Binomial name
- Caradrina kadenii (Freyer, 1836)

Synonyms
- Platyperigea kadenii; Caradrina (Platyperigea) kadenii

= Caradrina kadenii =

Clancy's rustic

Species of moth

Caradrina kadenii, or Clancy's rustic, is a moth of the family Noctuidae. The species was first described by Christian Friedrich Freyer in 1836. It originates from southern and central Europe, Asia Minor and southern Russia but in the 21st century it has extended its range to the north.

== Technical description and variation ==
Forewing luteous (muddy yellow) with a slight brownish tinge; the inner and outer lines indistinct, marked by black vein dots, and black costal spots; subterminal line interrupted, formed by whitish striae with rufous dentate marks internally; the termen with black striae; the orbicular a rufous dot; the reniform a rufous lunule with whitish clots round it; hindwing pure white in the male with some blackish striae along termen, dirty whitish in the female. Larva greyish brown, with whitish dorsal and dark subdorsal and lateral lines; the head and thoracic plate dark brown. The wingspan is about 30 mm. The length of the forewings is 12–15 mm.

== Biology ==
The moth flies from May to October, depending on the location.

The larvae feed on various low-growing herbaceous plants.

== Subspecies ==
- Caradrina kadenii kadenii
- Caradrina kadenii insularis (Sardinia)
