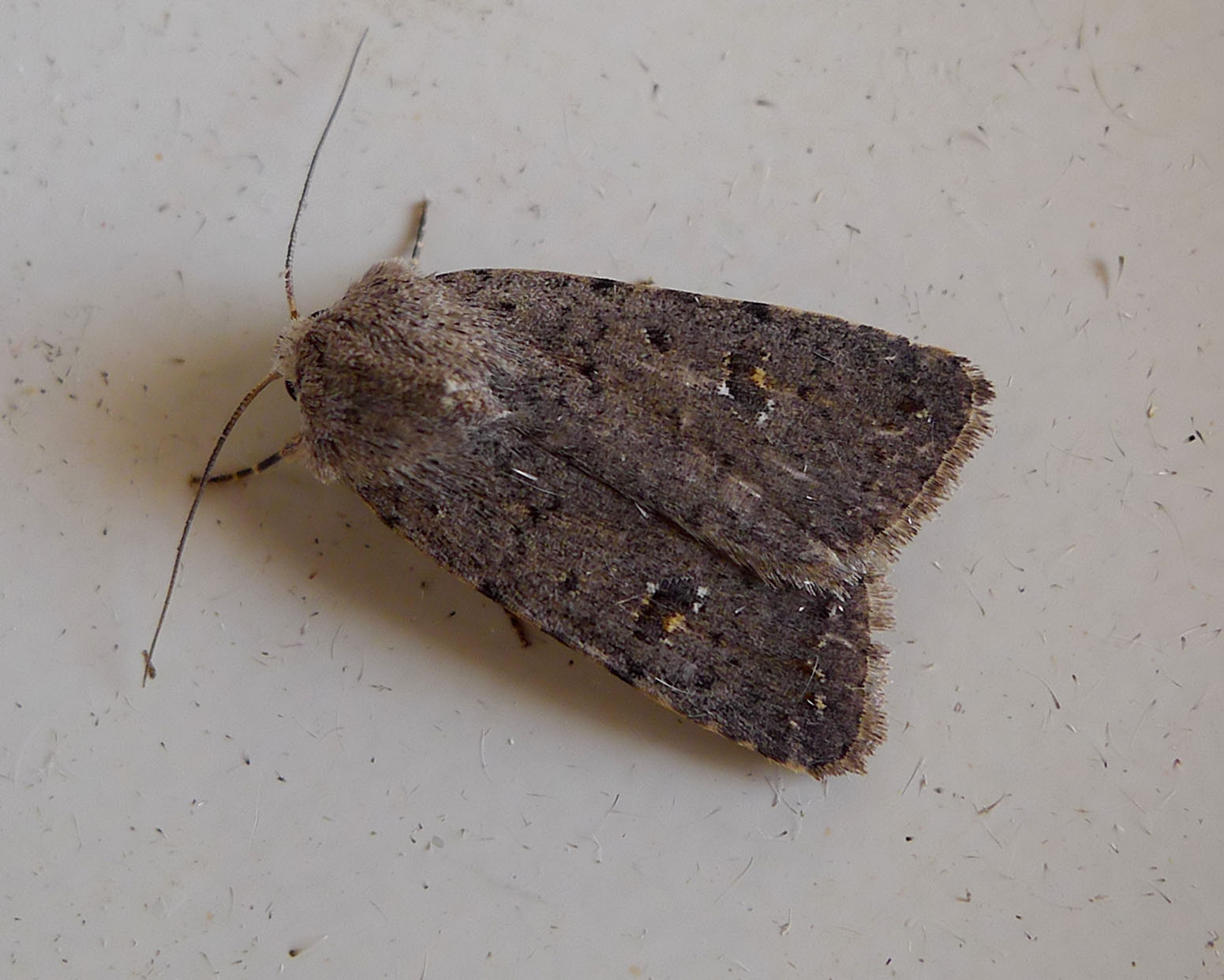

Scientific classification
- Kingdom: Animalia
- Phylum: Arthropoda
- Clade: Pancrustacea
- Class: Insecta
- Order: Lepidoptera
- Superfamily: Noctuoidea
- Family: Noctuidae
- Genus: Caradrina
- Species: C. flavirena

Binomial name
- Caradrina flavirena Guenée, [1852]

Synonyms
- Caradrina kadenii var. flavirena Guenée, 1852; Caradrina selini var. minor Staudinger, 1897; Caradrina flavirena ab. subdita Warren, 1911; Athetis muricolor Boursin, 1933; Paradrina muricolor; Caradrina flavirena subdita Leraut, 1980; Elaphria (Paradrina) zobeidah Boursin, 1937

= Caradrina flavirena =

Species of moth

Caradrina flavirena is a moth of the family Noctuidae. It was described by Achille Guenée in 1852. It is found in Morocco, Algeria, southern Europe, Turkey, Israel, Lebanon, Jordan, Syria, Armenia and Iran. The habitat consists of grasslands.

There are two generations per year with adults on wing from March to May and again from September to October.

The larvae are polyphagous on low-growing herbs.

== Subspecies ==
- Caradrina flavirena flavirena
- Caradrina flavirena zobeidah (Boursin, 1937) (Iraq)
