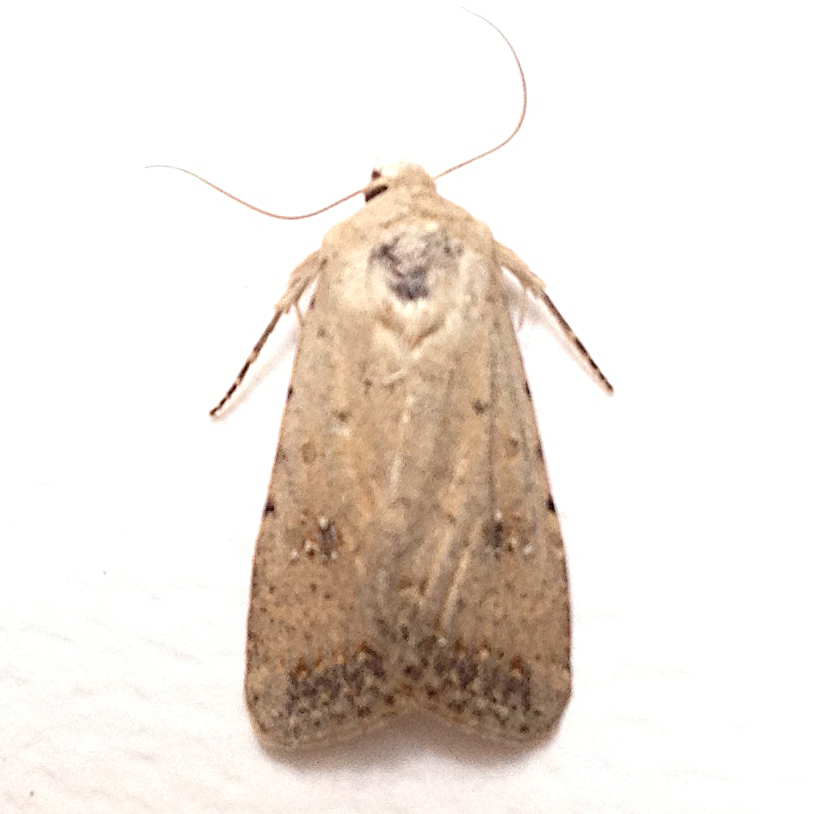
- Specimen from Utah

Scientific classification
- Domain: Eukaryota
- Kingdom: Animalia
- Phylum: Arthropoda
- Class: Insecta
- Order: Lepidoptera
- Superfamily: Noctuoidea
- Family: Noctuidae
- Genus: Caradrina
- Species: C. montana

Binomial name
- Caradrina montana Bremer, 1861

= Caradrina montana =

Species of moth

Caradrina montana is a small moth of the family Noctuoidea. It is common to western North America as well as western Asia and Europe. It feeds on alfalfa leaves.

The wingspan is 26–31 mm.
