= Niditinea praeumbrata =

Scientific classification
- Kingdom: Animalia
- Phylum: Arthropoda
- Class: Insecta
- Order: Lepidoptera
- Family: Tineidae
- Genus: Niditinea
- Species: N. praeumbrata

Binomial name
- Niditinea praeumbrata (Meyrick, 1919)

Synonyms
- Tinea praeumbrata Meyrick, 1919; Niditinea negreai Capuse & Georgescu, 1977; Tinea scotocleptes Meyrick, 1934

Species of moth

Niditinea praeumbrata is a moth of the family Tineidae. It is known from Cuba, Bermuda, Costa Rica and Guyana.

This species has a wingspan of 10–14 mm. The forewings are light brownish ochreous, somewhat sprinkled dark fuscous, especially posteriorly. The costa is more or less suffused fuscous and mottled dark fuscous from the base to the middle or three-fourths and the stigmata are moderate, cloudy and dark fuscous, the plical beneath the first discal. The hindwings are pale grey, with a faint brassy tinge.
