= Caradrina meralis =

Rare sand Quaker

Conservation status
- Imperiled (NatureServe)

Scientific classification
- Domain: Eukaryota
- Kingdom: Animalia
- Phylum: Arthropoda
- Class: Insecta
- Order: Lepidoptera
- Superfamily: Noctuoidea
- Family: Noctuidae
- Genus: Caradrina
- Species: C. meralis

Binomial name
- Caradrina meralis Morrison, 1875

Synonyms
- Caradrina bilunata Grote, 1877; Platyperigea meralis; Caradrina (Platyperigea) meralis

Species of moth

Caradrina meralis, the rare sand Quaker, is a moth of the family Noctuidae. The species was first described by Herbert Knowles Morrison in 1875. It is found in North America from New Jersey and New Hampshire, Ontario, Ohio and Wisconsin west across southern Canada to British Columbia, south to California and Arizona.

The wingspan is 28–30 mm. Adults are on wing in late summer and fall.
