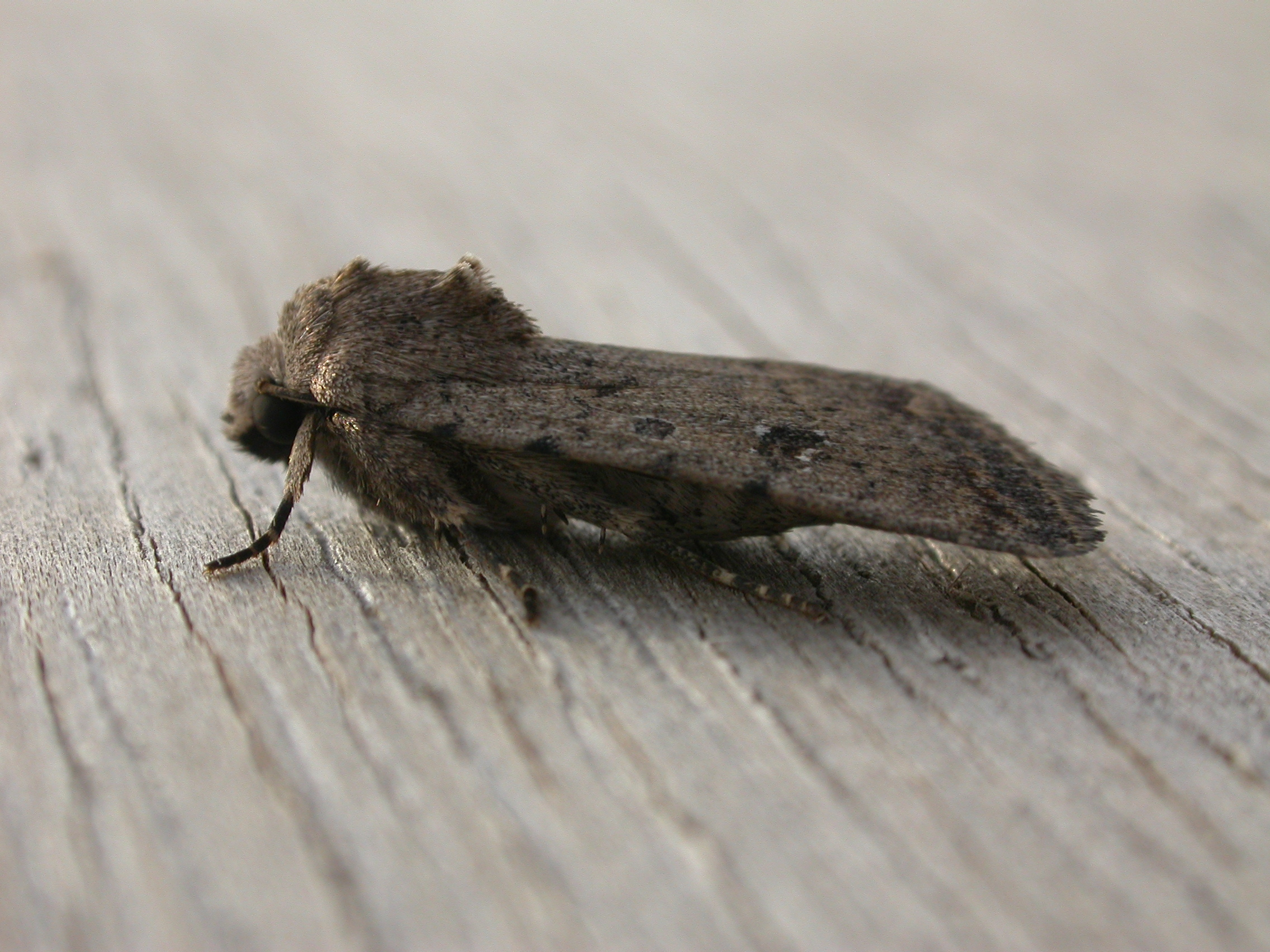

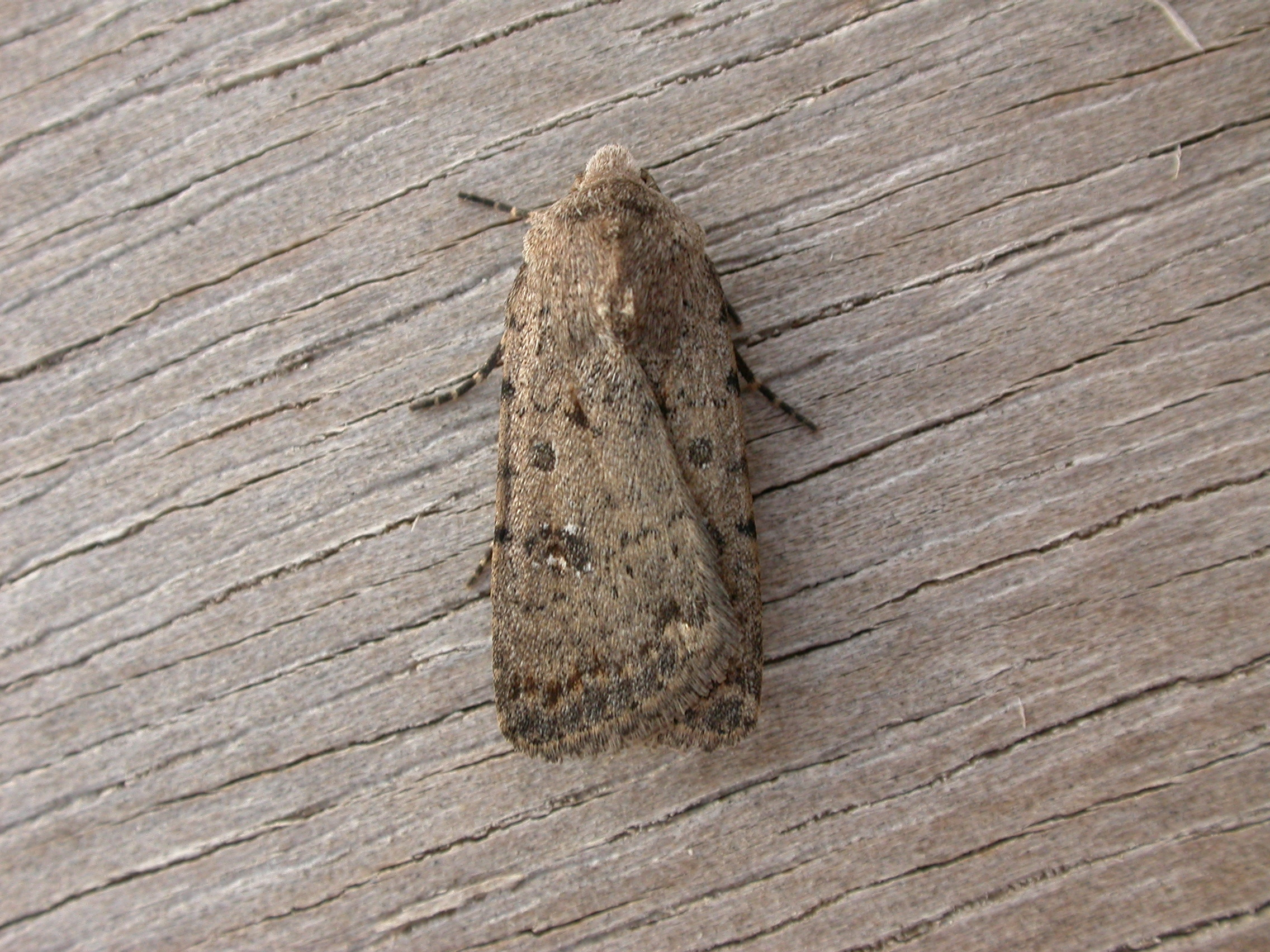

Scientific classification
- Kingdom: Animalia
- Phylum: Arthropoda
- Clade: Pancrustacea
- Class: Insecta
- Order: Lepidoptera
- Superfamily: Noctuoidea
- Family: Noctuidae
- Genus: Caradrina
- Species: C. clavipalpis

Binomial name
- Caradrina clavipalpis (Scopoli, 1763)

Synonyms
- Paradrina clavipalpis; Caradrina (Paradrina) clavipalpis

= Caradrina clavipalpis =

Species of moth

Caradrina clavipalpis, the pale mottled willow is a moth of the family Noctuidae. The species was first described by Giovanni Antonio Scopoli in his 1763 Entomologia Carniolica. It is found in the Palearctic realm (Europe, Algeria, Morocco, Tunisia, Libya, Egypt, Kuwait, Russia, Central Asia, Mongolia, Iraq, Iran, Afghanistan, Pakistan, north-west India, and Sri Lanka). It is an introduced species in North America, where it was first reported from Queens in New York City in 1993. In 2009 it was found in Rochester, New York, so it appears to be established and spreading.

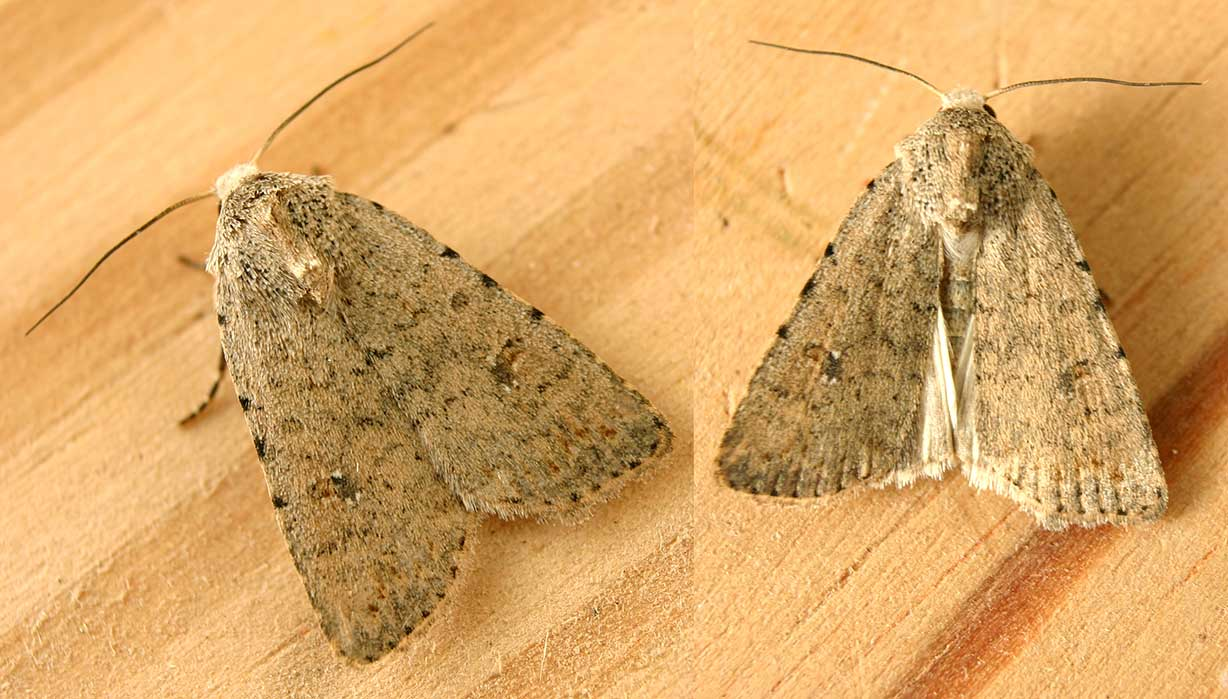

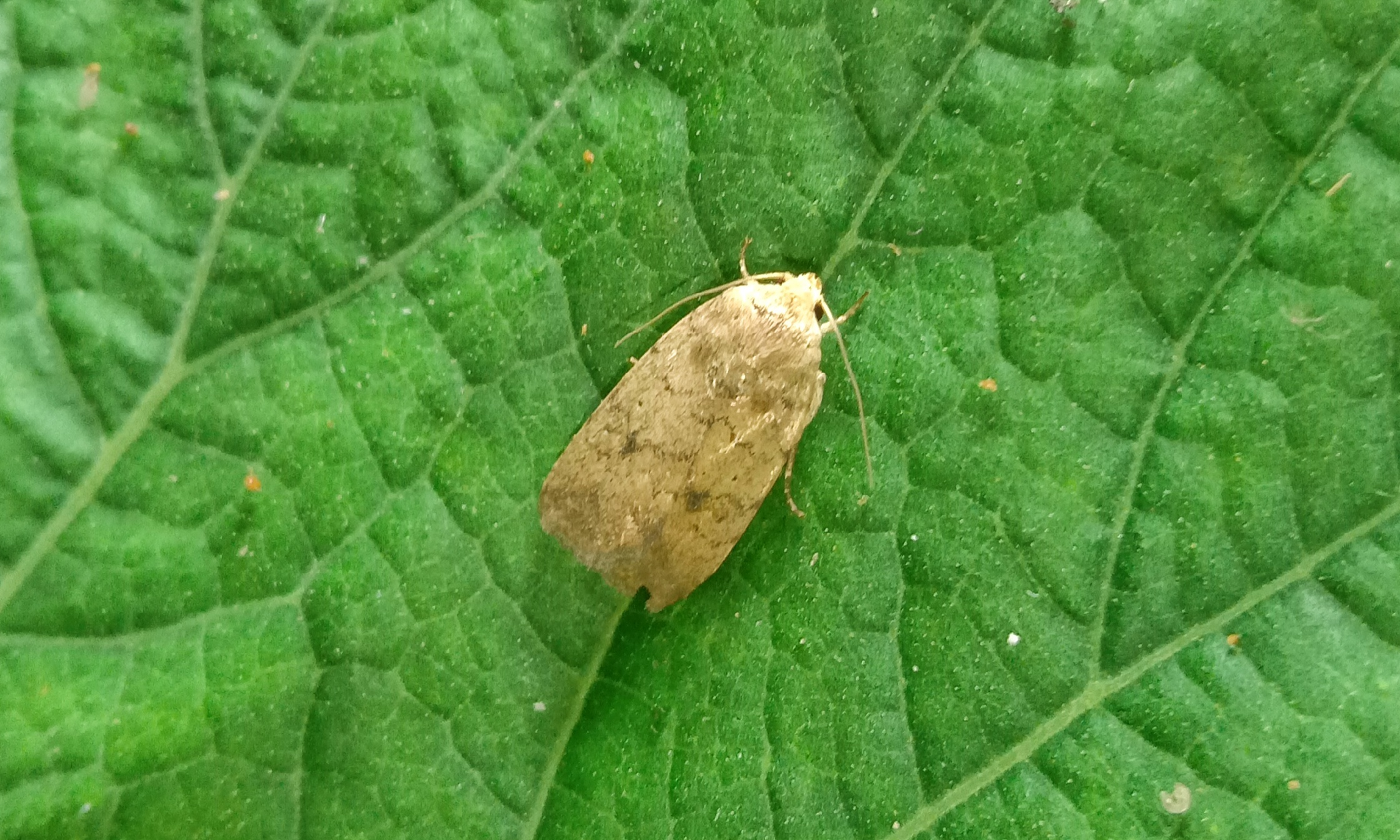
A pale mottled willow on a calabash leaf at night

== Description ==
The wingspan is 26–35 mm. The length of the forewings is 12–15 mm. Forewing pale to dark grey with darker dusting and sometimes tinged with ochreous; the terminal area generally fuscous; the lines starting from black costal spots; the inner and outer double, blackish, the inner minutely waved, the outer dentate; subterminal line pale, waved, preceded by a grey shade with dentate rufous marks in it; stigmata small, fuscous, the orbicular rounded, the reniform a narrow lunule, with two white dots on its inner edge and three on outer; hindwing white, the veins and termen dark grey; — in laciniosa Donz. the subterminal line consists of a row of three yellowish spots each extended to termen; — the form leucoptera Thnbg., from Scandinavia, Finland, and the Ural Mountains, has fuscous suffusion over the head, thorax, and forewing, the hindwing remaining white.

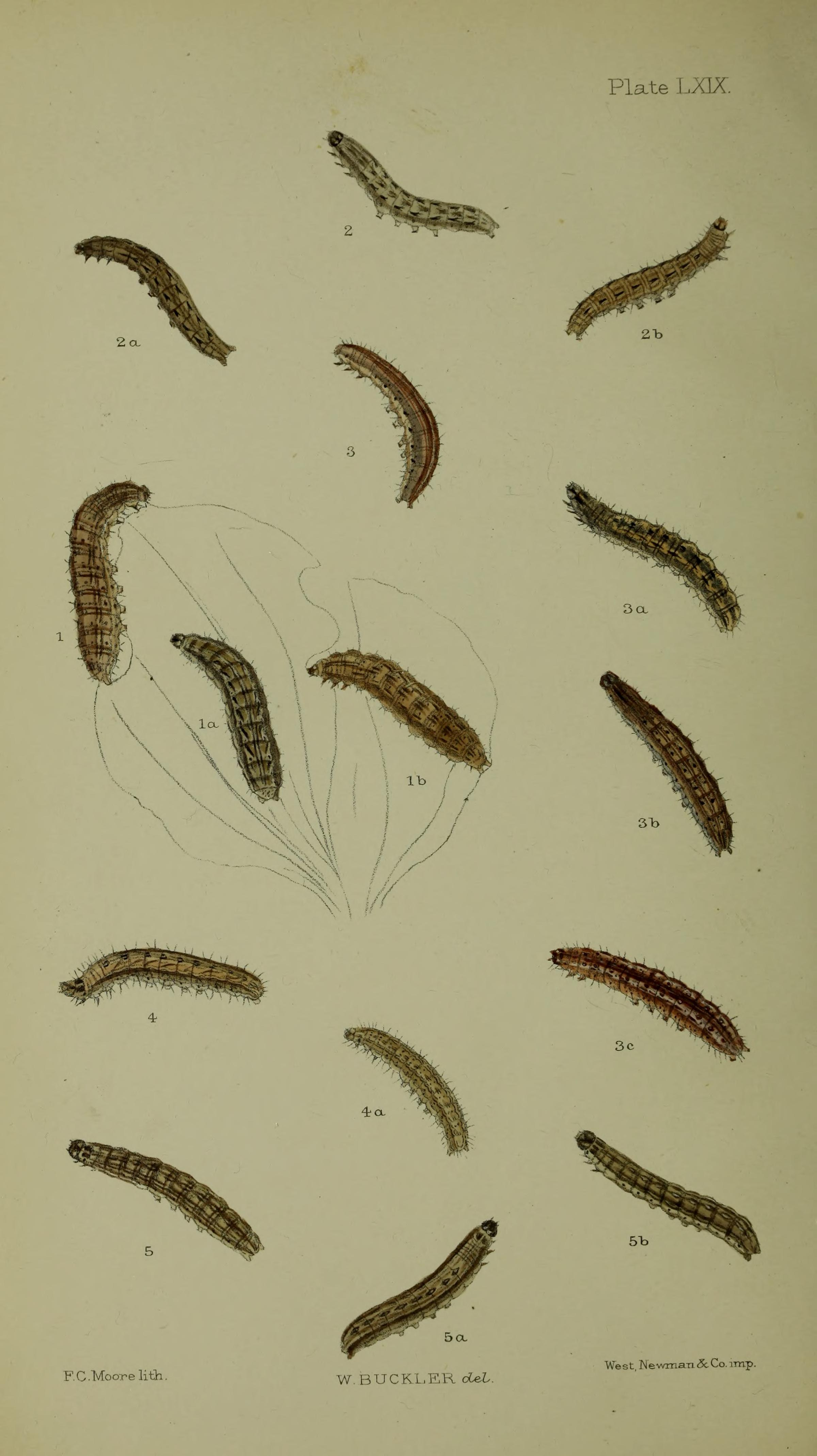
Figs. 5, 5a, 5 b larva after last moult

== Biology ==
The moth flies from April to October depending on the location. There are two generations per year in North America.

Larva fuscous with a green tinge; the lines paler, with dark edges. The larvae feed on Plantago and various grasses.

== Taxonomy ==
Some authors consider the genus Paradrina to be a full genus rather than a synonym of Caradrina, hence the species is also known as Paradrina clavipalpis or with Paradrina as a subgenus as Caradrina (Paradrina) clavipalpis.
