= Caradrina camina =

Scientific classification
- Domain: Eukaryota
- Kingdom: Animalia
- Phylum: Arthropoda
- Class: Insecta
- Order: Lepidoptera
- Superfamily: Noctuoidea
- Family: Noctuidae
- Tribe: Caradrinini
- Subtribe: Caradrinina
- Genus: Caradrina
- Species: C. camina

Binomial name
- Caradrina camina (Smith, 1894)

Species of moth

Caradrina camina is a species of cutworm or dart moth in the family Noctuidae. It is found in North America.

The MONA or Hodges number for Caradrina camina is 9655.

== Subspecies ==
These three subspecies belong to the species Caradrina camina:

- Caradrina camina alpha Barnes & Benjamin, 1926
- Caradrina camina beta Barnes & Benjamin, 1926
- Caradrina camina camina
