= Caradrina beta =

Scientific classification
- Domain: Eukaryota
- Kingdom: Animalia
- Phylum: Arthropoda
- Class: Insecta
- Order: Lepidoptera
- Superfamily: Noctuoidea
- Family: Noctuidae
- Genus: Caradrina
- Species: C. beta

Binomial name
- Caradrina beta (Barnes & Benjamin, 1926)

Species of moth

Caradrina beta is a species of cutworm or dart moth in the family Noctuidae first described by William Barnes and Foster Hendrickson Benjamin in 1926. It is found in North America.

The MONA or Hodges number for Caradrina beta is 9655.1.
