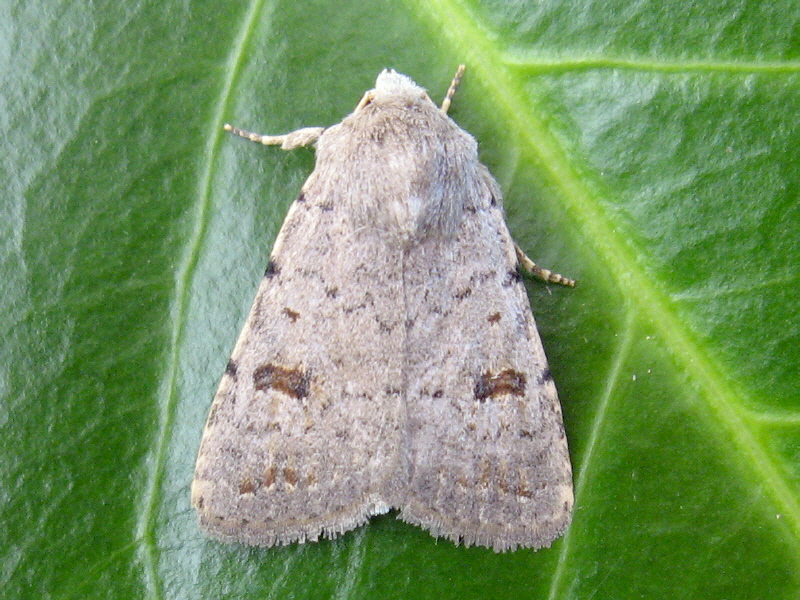
- Caradrina kadenii

Scientific classification
- Domain: Eukaryota
- Kingdom: Animalia
- Phylum: Arthropoda
- Class: Insecta
- Order: Lepidoptera
- Superfamily: Noctuoidea
- Family: Noctuidae
- Subtribe: Caradrinina
- Genus: Caradrina; Ochsenheimer, 1816

Synonyms
- Amphidrina Staudinger, [1892]; Platyperigea Smith, 1894; Platyperiga Smith, 1894; Eremodrina Boursin, 1937; Paradrina Boursin, 1937; Hymenodrina Boursin, 1937; Pseudophyllophila Berio, 1977; Boursinidrina Hacker, 2004; Kalchbergiana Hacker, 2004; Levantrina Hacker, 2004; Weigertrina Hacker, 2004

= Caradrina =

Genus of moths

Caradrina is a genus of moths of the family Noctuidae, erected by Ferdinand Ochsenheimer in 1816 and divided into eight subgenera. These include Paradrina and Platyperigea, which some authors treat as separate genera. By 1989, it comprised 189 described species.

== Description ==
The moths' eyes are naked and without lashes. Their proboscises are well developed and palpi upturned, the second joints evenly clothed with hair. Thoraces and abdomens are tuftless, tibiae spineless and ciliae non-crenulate.

== Species ==
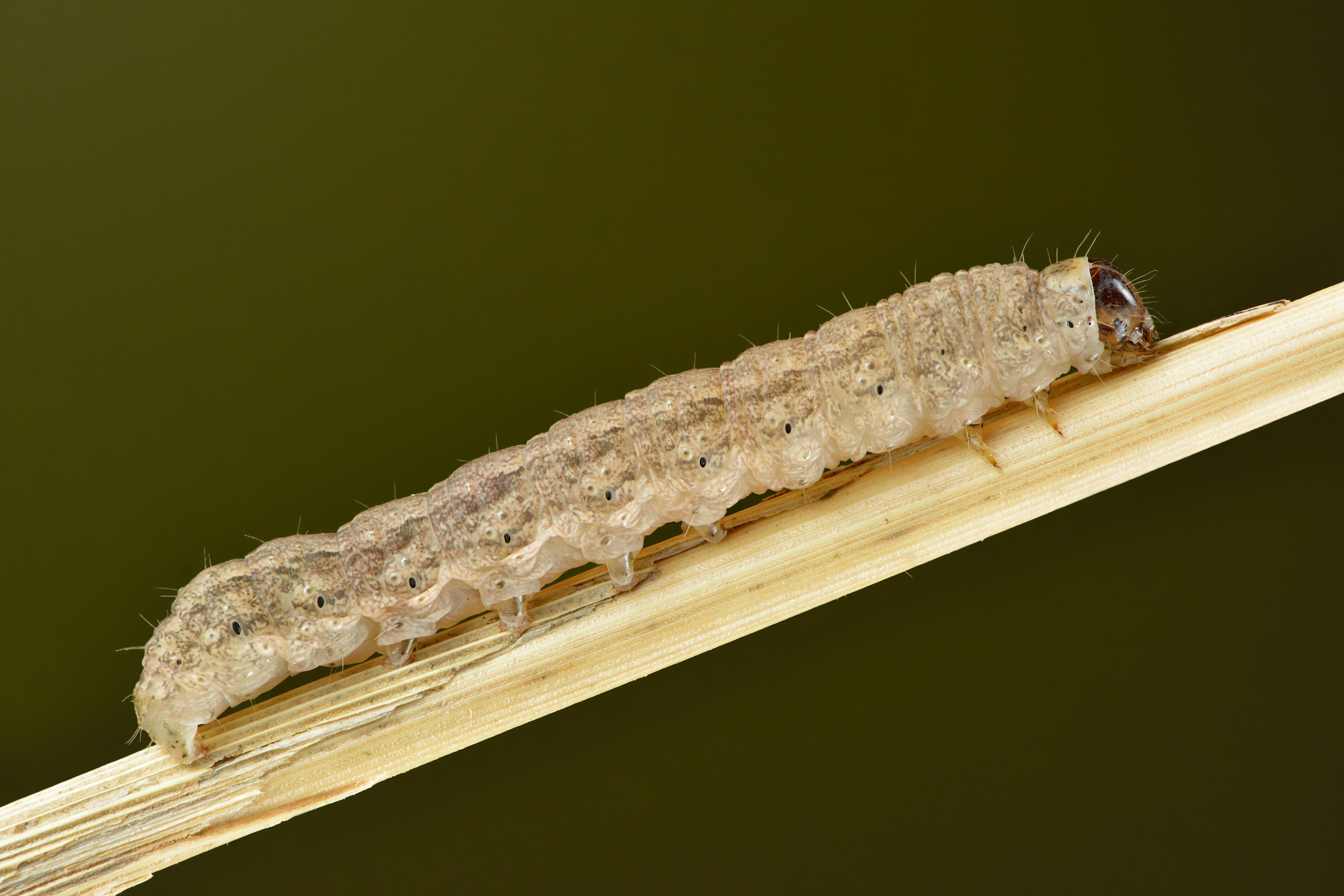
Caterpillar of genus Caradrina

- Caradrina abruzzensis (Draudt, 1933)
- Caradrina adriennea Hacker & Gyulai, 2004
- Caradrina africarabica (Plante, 1998)
- Caradrina afrotropicalis Hacker, 2004
- Caradrina agenjoi (Boursin, 1936)
- Caradrina agrotina Staudinger, 1891
- Caradrina alana Druce, 1890
- Caradrina albina Eversmann, 1848
- Caradrina aldegaitheri Wiltshire, 1986
- Caradrina alfierii (Boursin, 1937)
- Caradrina altissima Hacker, 2004
- Caradrina ammoxantha Boursin, 1957
- Caradrina amseli (Boursin, 1936)
- Caradrina armeniaca (Boursin, 1936)
- Caradrina asinina Saalmüller, 1891
- Caradrina aspersa Rambur, 1834
- Caradrina asymmetrica (Boursin, 1936)
- Caradrina atriluna Guenée, 1852
- Caradrina atrostriga (Barnes & McDunnough, 1912)
- Caradrina avis Pinker, 1979
- Caradrina azim Boursin, 1957
- Caradrina bactriana Boursin, 1967
- Caradrina baltistana Hacker, 2004
- Caradrina belucha Swinhoe, 1885
- Caradrina beta (Barnes & Benjamin, 1926)
- Caradrina bistrigata Bremer & Grey, 1853
- Caradrina bodenheimeri Amsel, 1935
- Caradrina boursini (Wagner, 1936)
- Caradrina brandti (Boursin, 1939)
- Caradrina callicora (Le Cerf, 1922)
- Caradrina camina (Smith, 1894)
- Caradrina casearia Staudinger, [1900]
- Caradrina chinensis Leech, 1900
- Caradrina clavipalpis (Scopoli, 1763) – pale mottled willow
- Caradrina conditorana Pinker, 1979
- Caradrina danieli Rungs, 1950
- Caradrina derogata (Walker, 1865)
- Caradrina diabolica (Boursin, 1942)
- Caradrina didyma (Boursin, 1939)
- Caradrina distigma Chrétien, 1913
- Caradrina distinctoides Poole, 1989 (syn. C. distincta (Barnes, 1928))
- Caradrina doleropsis (Boursin, 1939)
- Caradrina draudti (Boursin, 1936)
- Caradrina dubitata (Maassen, 1890)
- Caradrina dukei Krüger, 2005
- Caradrina eberti (Hacker, 1992)
- Caradrina ectomelaena (Hampson, 1916)
- Caradrina edentata (Berio, 1941)
- Caradrina eremicola (Plante, 1998)
- Caradrina eremocosma (Boursin, 1937)
- Caradrina eucrinospila (Boursin, 1936)
- Caradrina eugraphis Janse, 1938
- Caradrina eva Boursin, 1963
- Caradrina expansa Alphéraky, 1897
- Caradrina falciuncula (Varga & Ronkay, 1991)
- Caradrina fergana Staudinger, [1892]
- Caradrina fibigeri Hacker, 2004
- Caradrina filipjevi (Boursin, 1936)
- Caradrina flava Oberthür, 1876
- Caradrina flavirena Guenée, 1852
- Caradrina flavitincta (Hampson, 1909)
- Caradrina fulvafusca Hacker, 2004
- Caradrina furcivalva (Hacker, 1992)
- Caradrina fuscicornis Rambur, 1832
- Caradrina fuscifusa (Varga & Ronkay, 1991)
- Caradrina fuscomedia Hacker, 2004
- Caradrina gandhara Hacker, 2004
- Caradrina genitalana Hacker, 2004
- Caradrina germainii (Duponchel, 1835)
- Caradrina gilva (Donzel, 1837)
- Caradrina glaucistis Hampson, 1902
- Caradrina gyulaii Hacker, 2004
- Caradrina hedychroa (Boursin, 1936)
- Caradrina hemipentha (Boursin, 1939)
- Caradrina heptarchia (Boursin, 1936)
- Caradrina himachala Hacker, 2004
- Caradrina himaleyica Kollar, 1844
- Caradrina hoenei Hacker & Kononenko, 2004
- Caradrina hypocnephas Boursin, [1968]
- Caradrina hypoleuca Boursin, [1968]
- Caradrina hypostigma (Boursin, 1932)
- Caradrina ibeasi (Fernandez, 1918)
- Caradrina immaculata Motschulsky, 1860
- Caradrina ingrata Staudinger, 1897
- Caradrina inopinata Hacker, 2004
- Caradrina intaminata (Walker, 1865)
- Caradrina inumbrata (Staudinger, 1900)
- Caradrina inumbratella Pinker, 1979
- Caradrina isfahana Hacker, 2004
- Caradrina jacobsi (Rothschild, 1914)
- Caradrina kadenii Freyer, 1836 – Clancy's rustic
- Caradrina kashmiriana Boursin, [1968]
- Caradrina katherina Wiltshire, 1947
- Caradrina kautti Hacker, 2004
- Caradrina khorassana (Boursin, 1942)
- Caradrina klapperichi Boursin, 1957
- Caradrina kravchenkoi Hacker, 2004
- Caradrina lanzarotensis Pinker, 1962
- Caradrina leucopis Hampson, 1902
- Caradrina levantina Hacker, 2004
- Caradrina likiangia (Berio, 1977)
- Caradrina lobbichleri Boursin, 1970
- Caradrina localis Wiltshire, 1986
- Caradrina marginata Hacker, 2004
- Caradrina melanosema (Hampson, 1914)
- Caradrina melanura Alphéraky, 1897
- Caradrina melanurina (Staudinger, 1901)
- Caradrina mendica Maassen, 1890
- Caradrina meralis Morrison, 1875
- Caradrina merzbacheri Boursin, 1960
- Caradrina minoica Hacker, 2004
- Caradrina mirza Boursin, 1957
- Caradrina mona (Barnes & McDunnough, 1912)
- Caradrina monssacralis (Varga & Ronkay, 1991)
- Caradrina montana Bremer, 1864 (syn. C. extima (Walker, 1865)) – civil rustic
- Caradrina morosa Lederer, 1853
- Caradrina morpheus (Hufnagel, 1766) – mottled rustic
- Caradrina muelleri Hacker, 2004
- Caradrina multifera Walker, [1857] – speckled rustic
- Caradrina nadir Boursin, 1957
- Caradrina naumanni Hacker, 2004
- Caradrina nekrasovi Hacker, 2004
- Caradrina noctivaga Bellier, 1863
- Caradrina oberthuri (Rothschild, 1913)
- Caradrina olivascens Hacker, 2004
- Caradrina owgarra Bethune-Baker, 1908
- Caradrina pallidula Saarmüller, 1891
- Caradrina panurgia (Boursin, 1939)
- Caradrina parthica Hacker, 2004
- Caradrina parvaspersa (Boursin, 1936)
- Caradrina persimilis (Rothschild, 1920)
- Caradrina personata (Kuznetzov, 1958)
- Caradrina pertinax Staudinger, 1878
- Caradrina petraea Tengström, 1869
- Caradrina pexicera (Hampson, 1909)
- Caradrina phanosciera (Boursin, 1939)
- Caradrina poecila (Boursin, 1939)
- Caradrina prospera (Kuznetzov, 1958)
- Caradrina proxima Rambur, 1837
- Caradrina pseudadelpha (Boursin, 1939)
- Caradrina pseudagrotis (Hampson, 1918)
- Caradrina pseudalpina (Boursin, 1942)
- Caradrina pseudocosma (Plante, 1998)
- Caradrina pulvis (Boursin, 1939)
- Caradrina pushkara Hacker, 2004
- Caradrina rebeli Staudinger, 1901
- Caradrina rjabovi (Boursin, 1936)
- Caradrina ronkayrorum Hacker, 2004
- Caradrina roxana (Boursin, 1937)
- Caradrina rudebecki Krüger, 2005
- Caradrina salzi (Boursin, 1936)
- Caradrina sarhadica (Boursin, 1942)
- Caradrina scotoptera (Püngeler, 1914)
- Caradrina selini Boisduval, 1840
- Caradrina senecai Hacker, 2004
- Caradrina shugnana Hacker, 2004
- Caradrina signa (D. S. Fletcher, 1961)
- Caradrina singularis Hacker, 2004
- Caradrina sinistra (Janse, 1938)
- Caradrina sogdiana (Boursin, 1936)
- Caradrina soudanensis (Hampson, 1918)
- Caradrina squalida Eversmann, 1842
- Caradrina stenoeca Wiltshire, 1986
- Caradrina stenoptera (Boursin, 1939)
- Caradrina stilpna Boursin, 1957
- Caradrina superciliata Wallengren, 1856
- Caradrina surchica (Boursin, 1937)
- Caradrina suscianja (Mentzer, 1981)
- Caradrina syriaca Staudinger, [1892]
- Caradrina tenebrata Hampson, 1902
- Caradrina terrea Freyer, 1840
- Caradrina tibetica (Draudt, 1950)
- Caradrina tolima Maassen, 1890
- Caradrina torpens Guenée, 1852
- Caradrina transoxanica Hacker, 2004
- Caradrina turatii (Boursin, 1936)
- Caradrina turbulenta (Warren, 1911)
- Caradrina turcomana Hacker, 2004
- Caradrina umbratilis (Draudt, 1933)
- Caradrina vargai Hacker, 2004
- Caradrina variolosa Motschulsky, 1860
- Caradrina vicina Staudinger, 1870
- Caradrina warneckei (Boursin, 1936)
- Caradrina wiltshirei (Boursin, 1936)
- Caradrina wullschlegeli Püngeler, 1903
- Caradrina xanthopis (Hampson, 1909)
- Caradrina xanthorhoda (Boursin, 1937)
- Caradrina xiphophora Boursin, 1967
- Caradrina zaghrobia Hacker, 2004
- Caradrina zandi Wiltshire, 1952
- Caradrina zernyi (Boursin, 1936)
- Caradrina zuleika Boursin, 1957
