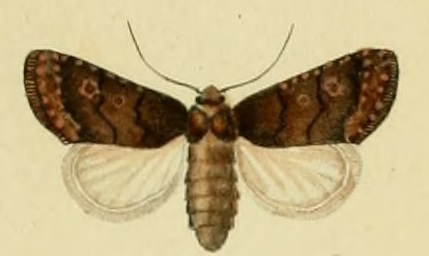

Scientific classification
- Domain: Eukaryota
- Kingdom: Animalia
- Phylum: Arthropoda
- Class: Insecta
- Order: Lepidoptera
- Superfamily: Noctuoidea
- Family: Noctuidae
- Genus: Caradrina
- Species: C. germainii

Binomial name
- Caradrina germainii (Duponchel, 1835)

Synonyms
- Bryophila germainii Duponchel, 1835; Caradrina germainii Rambur, 1837; Platyperigea germainii; Caradrina laciniosa Donzel, 1847; Athetis bolivari Fernandez, 1929; Athetis (Hymenodrina) leprii Berio, 1942; Caradrina (Platyperigea) psammopsis Boursin, 1967

= Caradrina germainii =

Species of moth

Caradrina germainii is a moth of the family Noctuidae. It was described by Philogène Auguste Joseph Duponchel in 1835. It is found in south-western Europe (including Sardinia, Corsica, Sicily and Malta) and North Africa (Morocco, Algeria). It is found mostly in garigue habitats.

Adults have been recorded on wing from June to July and again from September to October. The larvae feed on various low-growing plants.
