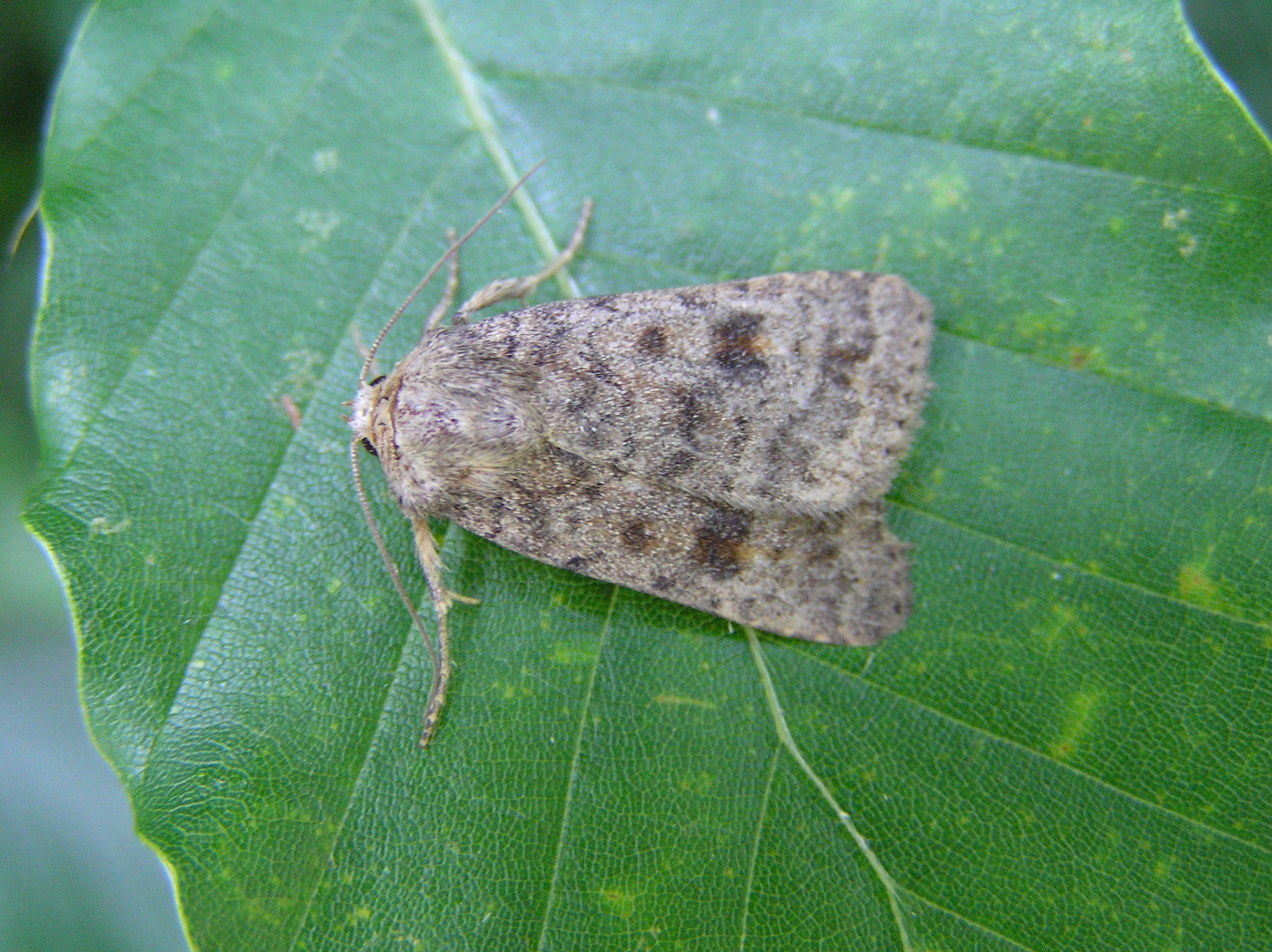

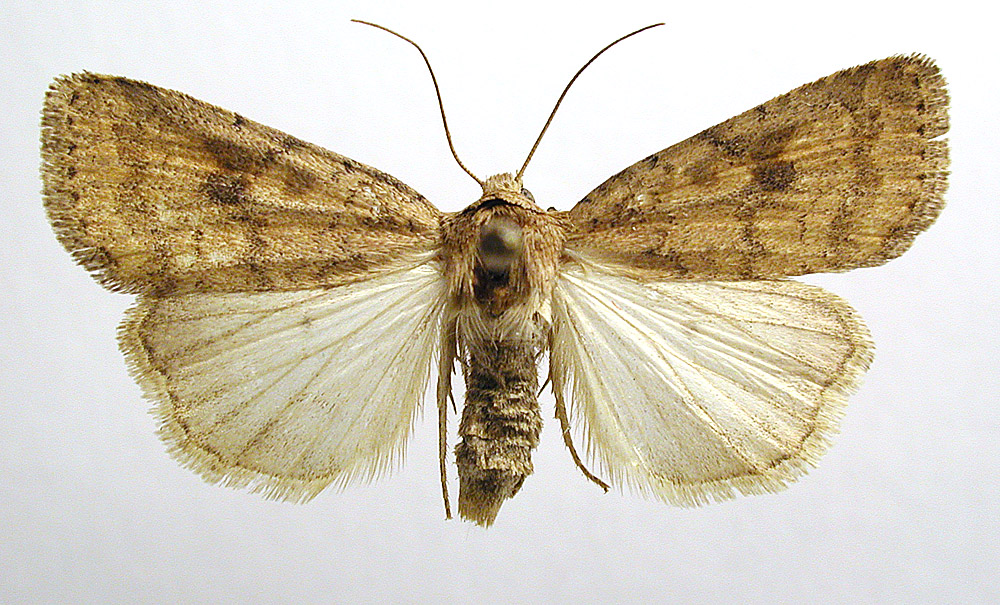

Scientific classification
- Domain: Eukaryota
- Kingdom: Animalia
- Phylum: Arthropoda
- Class: Insecta
- Order: Lepidoptera
- Superfamily: Noctuoidea
- Family: Noctuidae
- Genus: Caradrina
- Species: C. morpheus

Binomial name
- Caradrina morpheus (Hufnagel, 1766)

= Caradrina morpheus =

Species of moth

Caradrina morpheus, the mottled rustic, is a moth of the superfamily Noctuoidea. The species was first described by Johann Siegfried Hufnagel in 1766. It is found across the Palearctic from northern Europe to Siberia, Amur and Korea. Also in Armenia and Turkestan. It was accidentally introduced on both the east and west coasts of Canada and is so far reported in the east from New Brunswick to Ontario, and in the west from British Columbia.

== Description ==
The wingspan is 32–38 mm. The length of the forewings is 13–16 mm. Forewing dull dark fuscous with a greyish tinge; inner and outer lines obscure, double, the arms far apart; subterminal line grey, with dark suffusion on inner side; orbicular and reniform cloudy fuscous, the latter with a slight fulvous stain on its outer edge at middle; hindwing dull whitish; the cellspot, the veins towards termen, and a slight subterminal line grey. Diagnostic features: forewings may be pale brown or darker brown, forewings may have a glossy appearance; the darker stigmata clearly defined, antemedian line is dentate; postmedian line is poorly defined; subterminal line pale with a darker mottled suffusion; termen with dark lunules between the veins, hindwings are pale glossy white with a small discal spot.

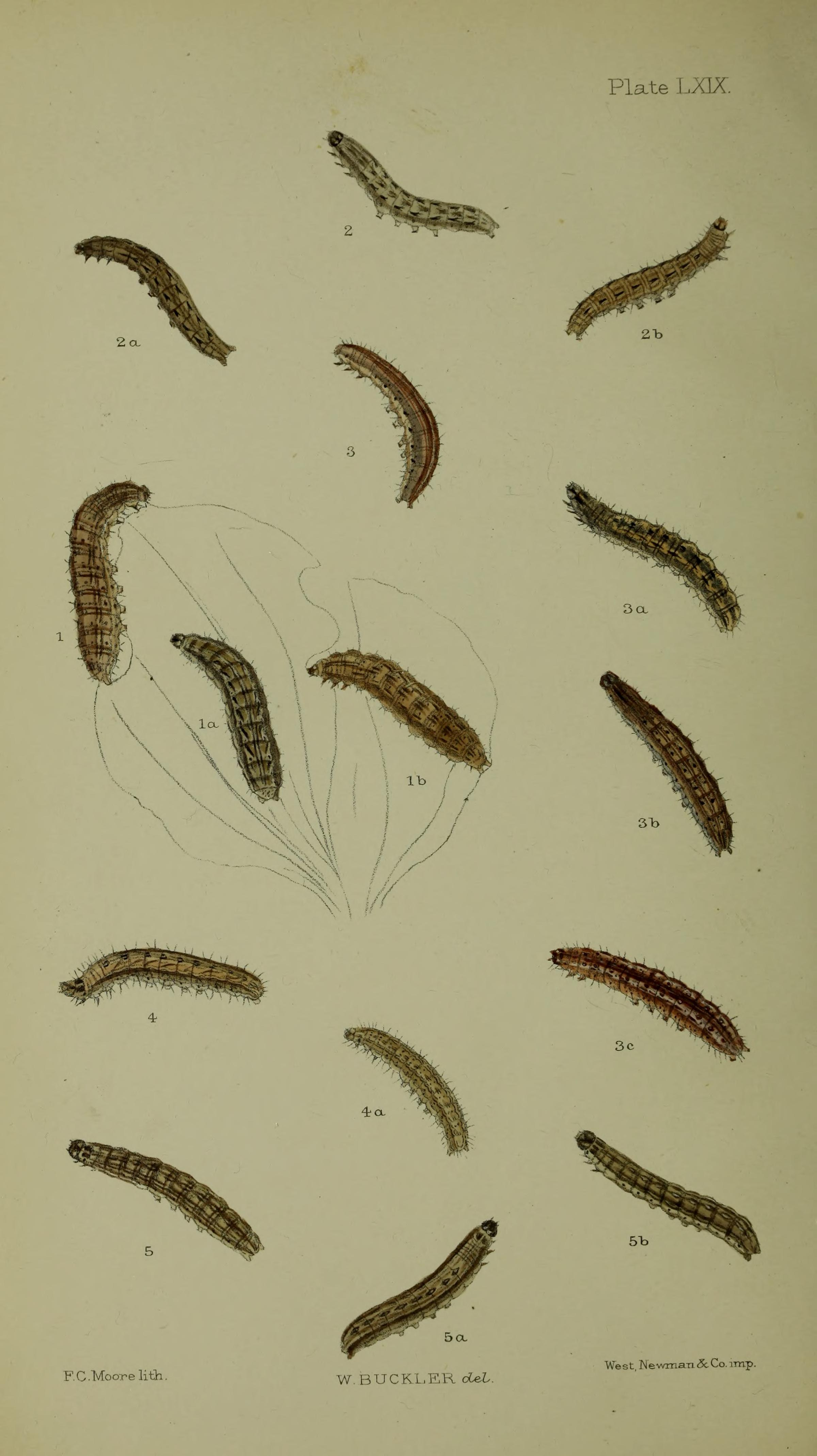
Figs 2, 2a, 2b larva after last moult

== Biology ==
The moth flies in one generation from mid-May to August.

Larva greyish brown or dark brown; dorsal line paler, with dark irregular edges; a subdorsal row of blackish sagittate (arrowhead shaped) markings; spiracular line darker; head brown with dark speckling. The larvae feed on various herbaceous plants including nettle and dandelion.

== Notes ==
1. The flight season refers to Belgium and the Netherlands. This may vary in other parts of the range.
