= Caradrina vicina =

Scientific classification
- Domain: Eukaryota
- Kingdom: Animalia
- Phylum: Arthropoda
- Class: Insecta
- Order: Lepidoptera
- Superfamily: Noctuoidea
- Family: Noctuidae
- Genus: Caradrina
- Species: C. vicina

Binomial name
- Caradrina vicina Staudinger, [1870]

Synonyms
- Eremodrina vicina; Athetis perspicua Warren, 1911; Athetis vicina rosea Boursin, 1936

Species of moth

Caradrina vicina is a moth of the family Noctuidae. It was described by Staudinger in 1870. It is found from Central and Southeastern Europe, eastern and central Anatolia, and Western to Central Asia. The habitat consists of grasslands.

The wingspan is 23–28 mm. There is one generation per year with adults on wing from August to October.

== Subspecies ==
- Caradrina vicina vicina (southern European Russia, western Turkestan, northern Pakistan, Afghanistan, northern Iran, eastern Turkey)
- Caradrina vicina castrensis Berio, 1981 (Italy)
- Caradrina vicina hunza Hacker, 1992
- Caradrina vicina rosea (Boursin, 1936) (Libya)
