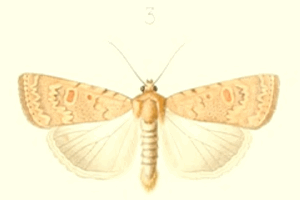

Scientific classification
- Domain: Eukaryota
- Kingdom: Animalia
- Phylum: Arthropoda
- Class: Insecta
- Order: Lepidoptera
- Superfamily: Noctuoidea
- Family: Noctuidae
- Genus: Caradrina
- Species: C. flava

Binomial name
- Caradrina flava (Oberthür, 1876)

Synonyms
- Paradrina flava; Athetis approximans Rothschild, 1914

= Caradrina flava =

Species of moth

Caradrina flava is a moth of the family Noctuidae. It was described by Charles Oberthür in 1876. It can be found in Spain, Greece, Malta and the Canary Islands, as well as from the Sahara to the Arabian Peninsula, Israel, Jordan, the Levant, Iran and Iraq.

There are two generations per year with adults on wing from October to December and again from February to April.
