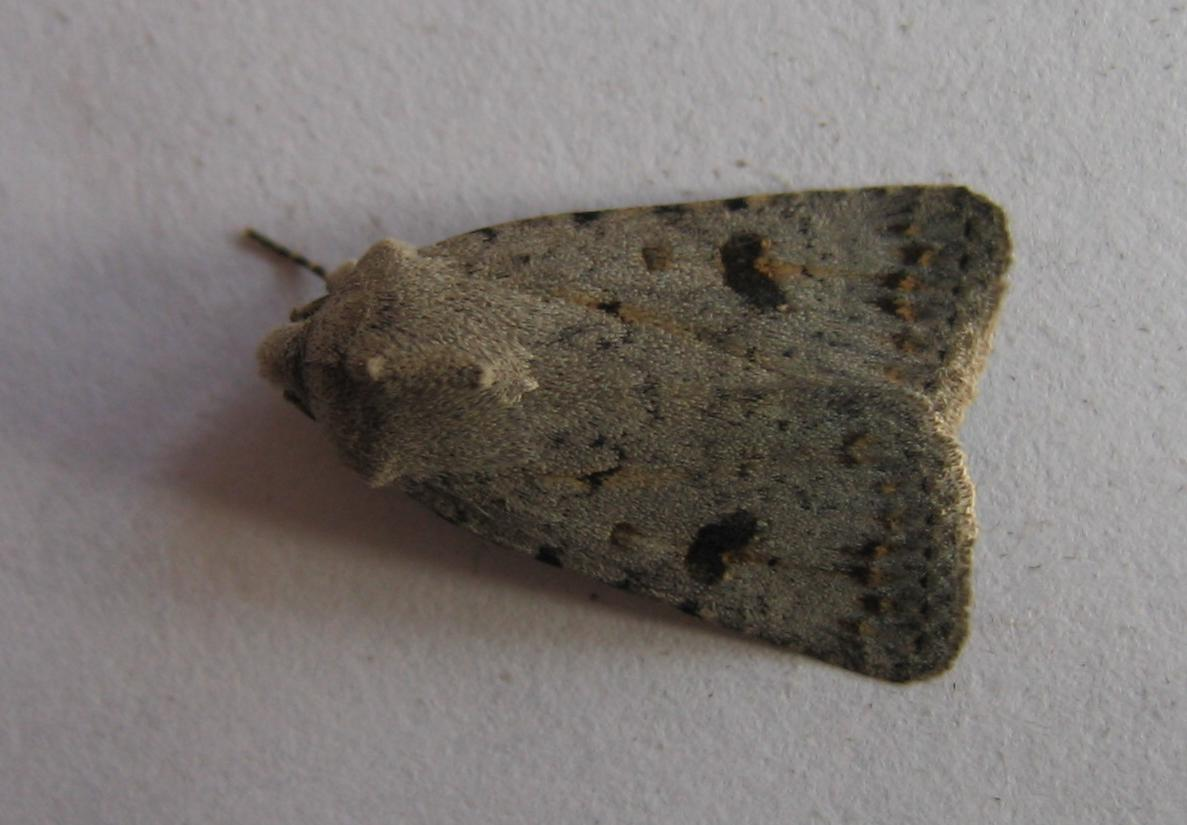

Scientific classification
- Kingdom: Animalia
- Phylum: Arthropoda
- Clade: Pancrustacea
- Class: Insecta
- Order: Lepidoptera
- Superfamily: Noctuoidea
- Family: Noctuidae
- Genus: Caradrina
- Species: C. rebeli

Binomial name
- Caradrina rebeli Staudinger, 1901

Synonyms
- Caradrina rebeli; Caradrina (Paradrina) rebeli

= Paradrina rebeli =

Species of moth

Paradrina rebeli is a moth of the family Noctuidae. The species was first described by Otto Staudinger in 1901. It is endemic to the Canary Islands. Some authors consider the genus Paradrina to be a subgenus of Caradrina, hence the species is also known as Caradrina rebeli or Caradrina (Paradrina) rebeli.

The wingspan is 26–31 mm (1.0–1.2 in). The moth flies year round.

The larvae feed on various herbaceous plants.
