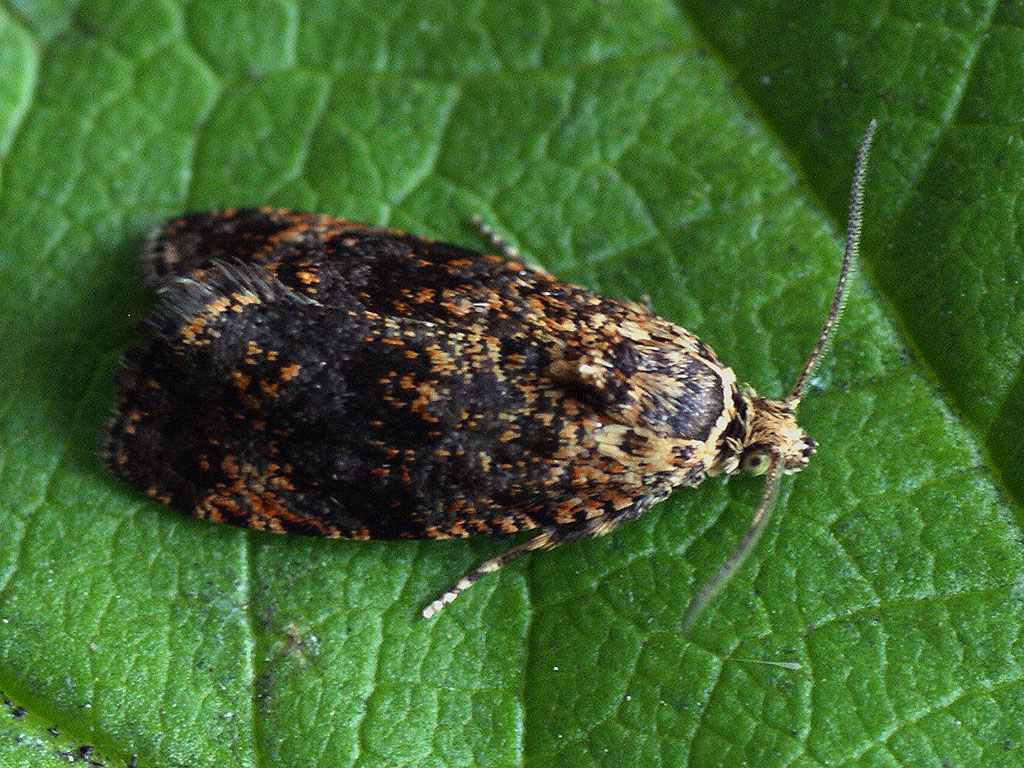
- Selenodes karelicus Russia

Scientific classification
- Kingdom: Animalia
- Phylum: Arthropoda
- Class: Insecta
- Order: Lepidoptera
- Family: Tortricidae
- Subfamily: Tortricinae
- Genus: Selenodes; Guenée, 1845

= Selenodes =

Genus of tortrix moths

Selenodes is a genus of moths belonging to the subfamily Tortricinae of the family Tortricidae.

== Species ==
- Selenodes concretanus (Wocke, 1862)
- Selenodes karelicus (Tengstrom, 1875)

== See also ==
- List of Tortricidae genera
