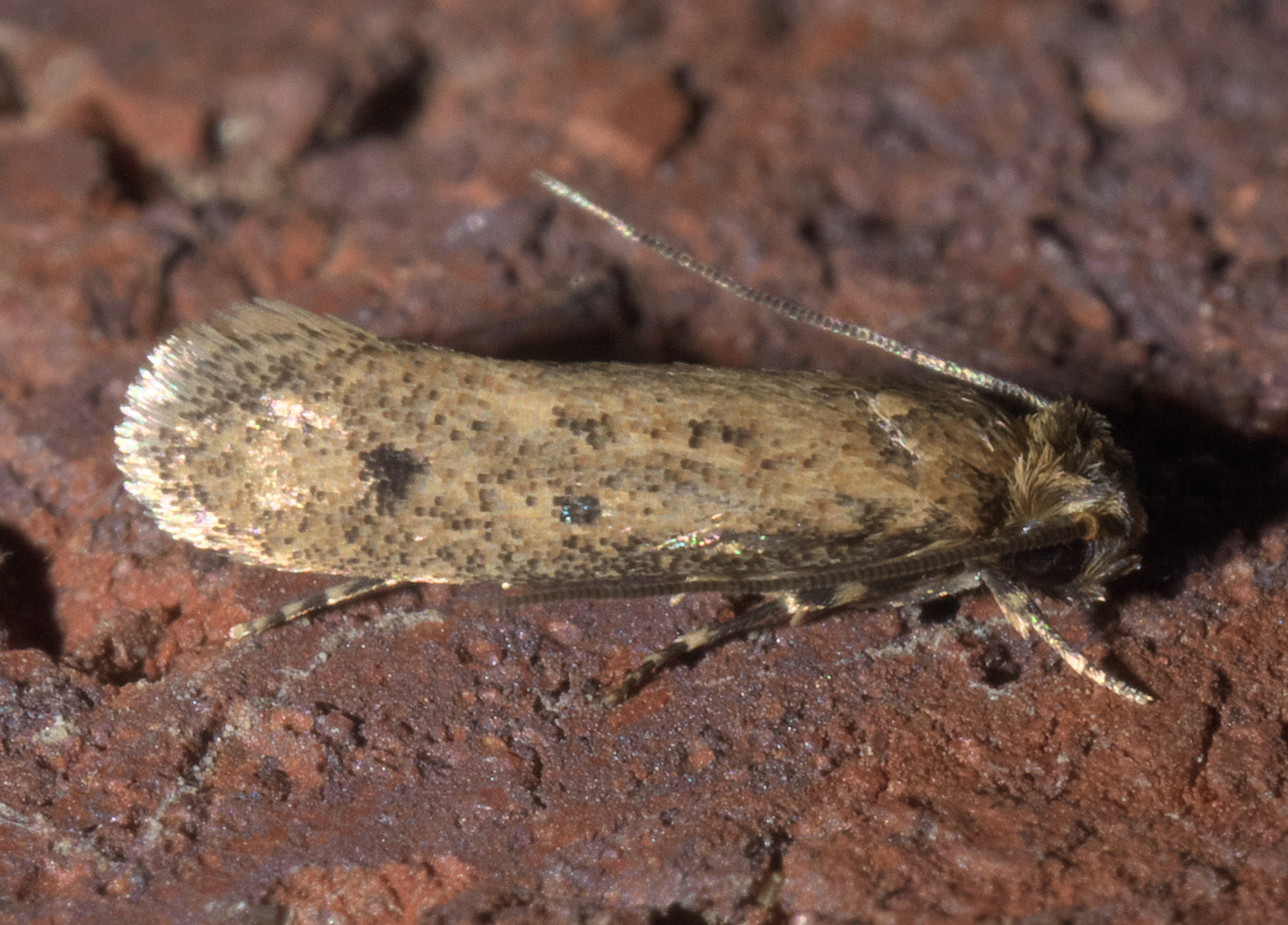

Scientific classification
- Kingdom: Animalia
- Phylum: Arthropoda
- Clade: Pancrustacea
- Class: Insecta
- Order: Lepidoptera
- Family: Tineidae
- Genus: Niditinea
- Species: N. orleansella

Binomial name
- Niditinea orleansella (Chambers, 1873)

= Niditinea orleansella =

Species of moth

Niditinea orleansella is a species of clothes moth in the family Tineidae.

The MONA or Hodges number for Niditinea orleansella is 0412.
