= Caradrina atrostriga =

Scientific classification
- Domain: Eukaryota
- Kingdom: Animalia
- Phylum: Arthropoda
- Class: Insecta
- Order: Lepidoptera
- Superfamily: Noctuoidea
- Family: Noctuidae
- Genus: Caradrina
- Species: C. atrostriga

Binomial name
- Caradrina atrostriga (Barnes & McDunnough, 1912)

Species of moth

Caradrina atrostriga is a species of cutworm or dart moth in the family Noctuidae. It was first described by William Barnes and James Halliday McDunnough in 1912 and it is found in North America.

The MONA or Hodges number for Caradrina atrostriga is 9659.
