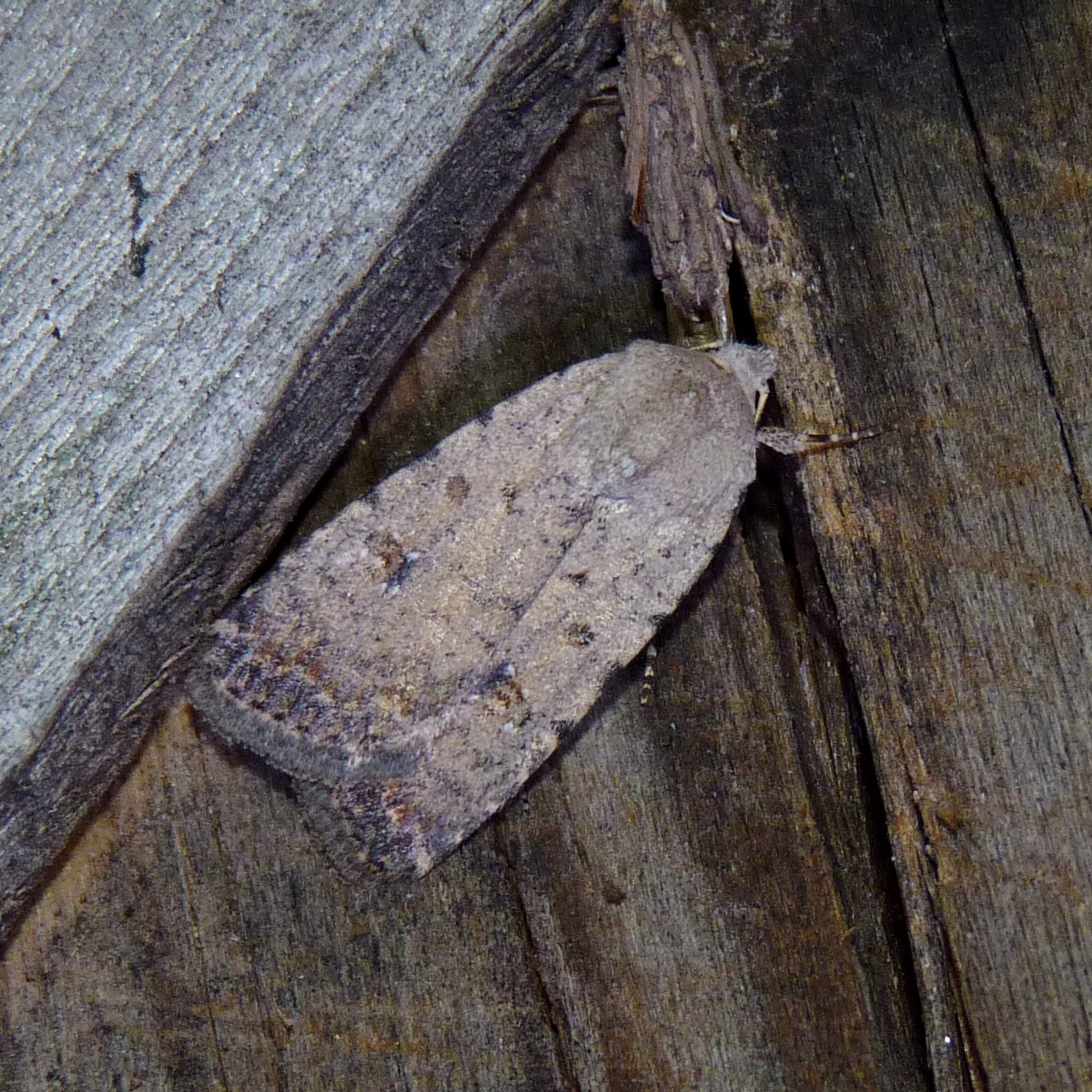

Scientific classification
- Kingdom: Animalia
- Phylum: Arthropoda
- Clade: Pancrustacea
- Class: Insecta
- Order: Lepidoptera
- Superfamily: Noctuoidea
- Family: Noctuidae
- Genus: Caradrina
- Species: C. multifera

Binomial name
- Caradrina multifera Walker, [1857]

Synonyms
- Segetia fidicularia Morrison, 1875; Platyperigea multifera

= Caradrina multifera =

Speckled rustic moth

Species of moth

Caradrina multifera, the speckled rustic moth, is a moth of the family Noctuidae. The species was first described by Francis Walker in 1857. It is found in North America from Newfoundland to North Carolina and Tennessee and west to Minnesota and Manitoba. It is also present in British Columbia and Washington.

The wingspan is 30–32 mm. They are on wing from July to October in one generation per year.
