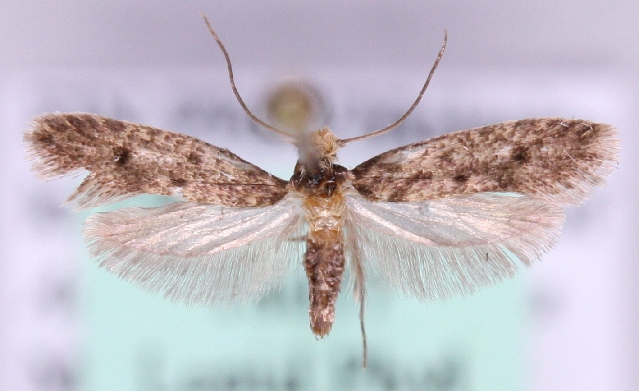

Scientific classification
- Kingdom: Animalia
- Phylum: Arthropoda
- Clade: Pancrustacea
- Class: Insecta
- Order: Lepidoptera
- Family: Tineidae
- Genus: Niditinea
- Species: N. striolella

Binomial name
- Niditinea striolella (Matsumura, 1931)

Synonyms
- Tinea striolella Matsumura, 1931; Tinea ignotella Zagulajev, 1956; Tinea piercella Bentinck, 1935; Niditinea piercella; Niditinea distinguenda Petersen, 1957; Tinea pacifella Zagulajev, 1960; Niditinea semidivisa Meyrick, 1934

= Niditinea striolella =

Species of moth

Niditinea striolella, the brindled clothes moth, is a moth of the family Tineidae. It was described by Shōnen Matsumura in 1931. It is found from most of Europe to Japan.

The wingspan is 16–21 mm. The ground colour is buff, heavily irrorated (sprinkled) with darker scales. Adults are on wing from June to August.

Larvae have been reared from birds' nests, especially those in nest boxes or holes made by woodpeckers. They live within a silken tube or tent.
