= Caradrina albina =

Scientific classification
- Domain: Eukaryota
- Kingdom: Animalia
- Phylum: Arthropoda
- Class: Insecta
- Order: Lepidoptera
- Superfamily: Noctuoidea
- Family: Noctuidae
- Genus: Caradrina
- Species: C. albina

Binomial name
- Caradrina albina Eversmann, 1848

Species of moth

Caradrina albina is a species of moth belonging to the family Noctuidae.

It is native to Europe.
