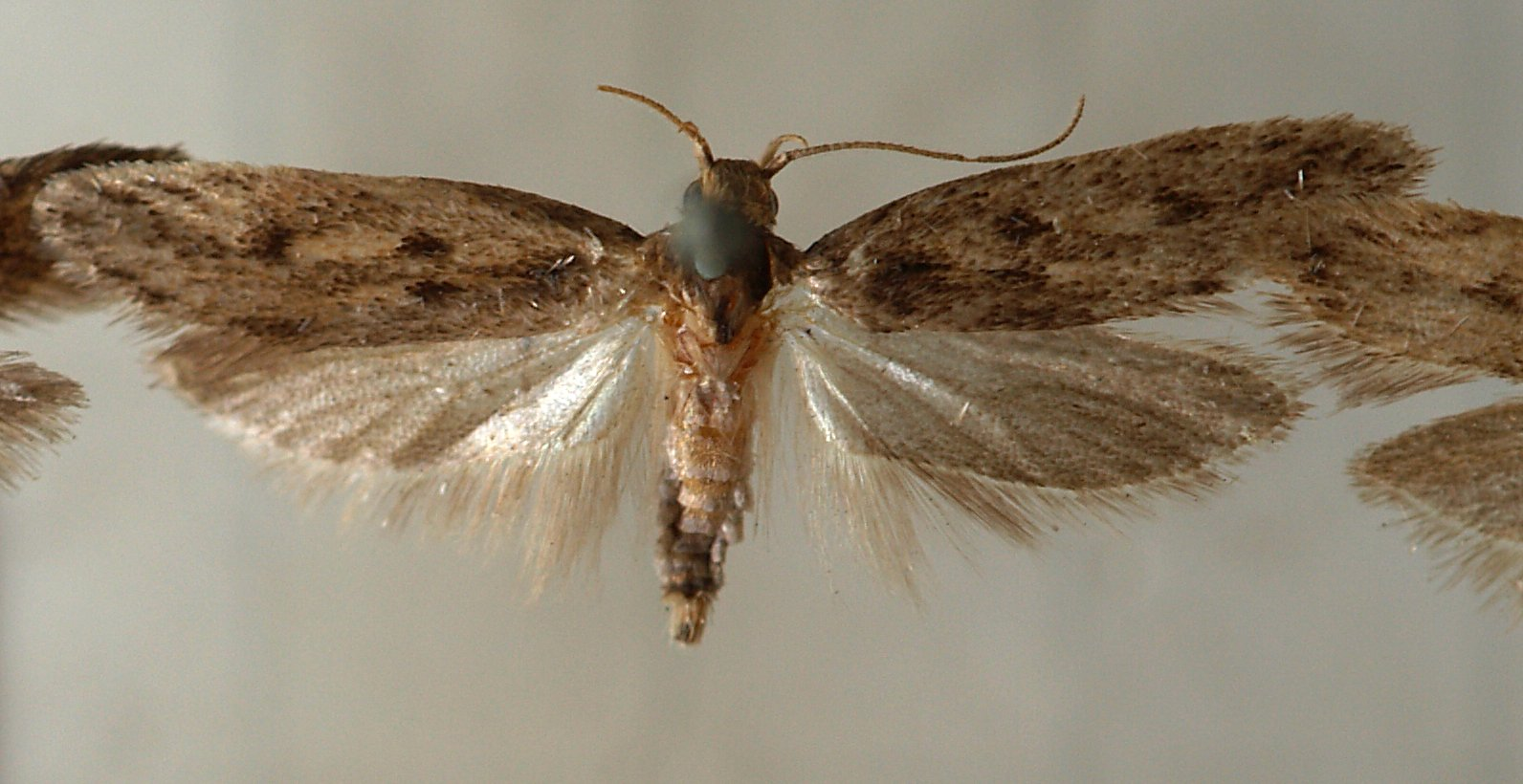

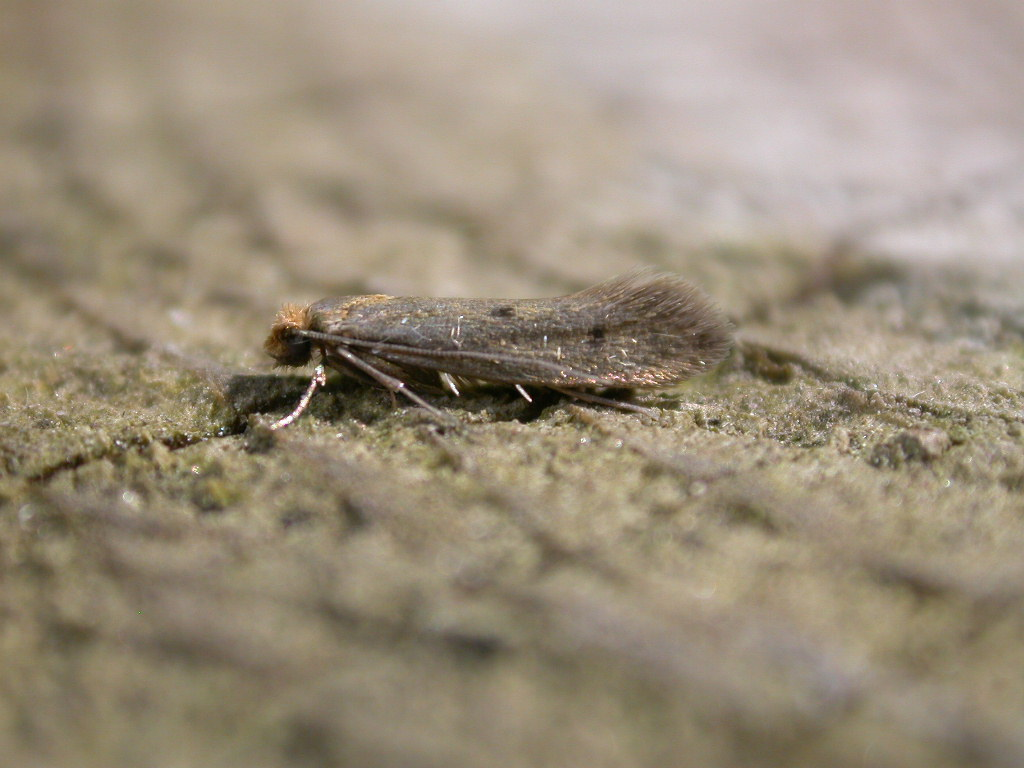

Scientific classification
- Kingdom: Animalia
- Phylum: Arthropoda
- Clade: Pancrustacea
- Class: Insecta
- Order: Lepidoptera
- Family: Tineidae
- Genus: Niditinea
- Species: N. fuscella

Binomial name
- Niditinea fuscella (Linnaeus, 1758)

Synonyms
- Numerous, see text

= Niditinea fuscella =

Brown-dotted clothes moth

Species of moth

The brown-dotted clothes moth (Niditinea fuscella) is a species of tineoid moth. It belongs to the fungus moth family (Tineidae), and therein to the nominate subfamily Tineinae. It is (under its junior synonym Tinea fuscipunctella) the type species of its genus Niditinea.

It is widespread and common in much of the western Palearctic (except for outlying islands, e.g. Iceland, and cold regions such as the far north of Scotland), but has also been introduced elsewhere (e.g. in Australia and New Zealand). The adult moths are on the wing around May to September, depending on the location; they are not fond of bright daylight and will only come out in the late afternoon.

Adults of this small moth have a wingspan of 14 mm. They are of a rather dull coloration, with brown-grey forewings that bear three large blackish-brown dots each. The hindwings are a silvery white; they are surrounded by a long-haired fringe, as usual for fungus moths and relatives. The body is dull brown, and the head bears a tuft of reddish-brown hair.

The caterpillars feed on dry animal and plant remains. Despite the species' common name, they are rarely recorded as a pest of clothing. Though they will eat discarded wool and similar fabrics, they are more commonly found in bird nests – particularly of chicken (Gallus gallus domesticus), domestic pigeon (Columba livia domestica), swallows (Hirundinidae) and woodpeckers (Picidae) – where they feed on shed feathers and feces. Less usual foodstuffs of this species are dry peas and dried fruit, bran, dry rose flowers, the dead beetles in mealworm (Tenebrio molitor) cultures and even pigskin bookbindings.

== Synonyms ==
Invalid scientific names (junior synonyms and others) of the brown-dotted clothes moth are:

- Niditinea frigidella (Packard, 1867)
- Niditinea fuscipunctella (Haworth, 1828)
- Niditinea griseella (Chambers, 1873)
- Niditinea ignotella (Walker, 1864) (non Walker 1863: preoccupied)
- Niditinea nubilipennella (Clemens, 1859)
- Niditinea spretella (Denis & Schiffermüller, 1775)
- Oecophora frigidella Packard, 1867
- Tinea abligatella Walker, 1863
- Tinea crinitella Schrank, 1802
- Tinea distans Gozmány, 1959
- Tinea eurinella Zagulajev, 1952
- Tinea fuscella Linnaeus, 1758
- Tinea fuscipunctella Haworth, 1828
- Tinea griseella Chambers, 1873
- Tinea ignotella Walker, 1864 (non Walker 1863: preoccupied)
- Tinea nubilipennella Clemens, 1859
- Tinea spretella Denis & Schiffermüller, 1775

N. spretella is sometimes still considered a distinct species, but most recent authors include it here.
