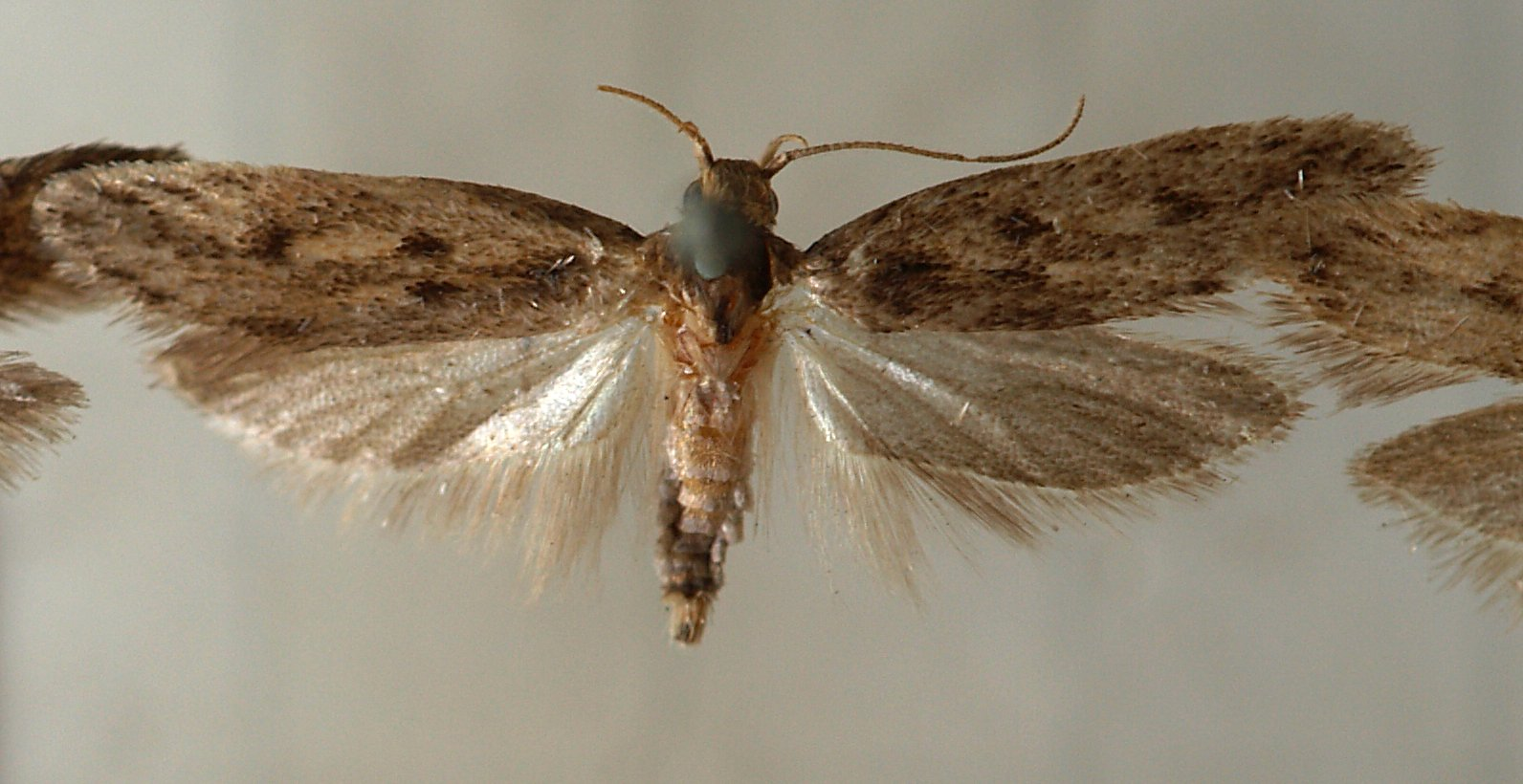
- Brown-dotted clothes moth (N. fuscella), adult specimen

Scientific classification
- Kingdom: Animalia
- Phylum: Arthropoda
- Clade: Pancrustacea
- Class: Insecta
- Order: Lepidoptera
- Family: Tineidae
- Subfamily: Tineinae
- Genus: Niditinea; Petersen, 1957

Type species
- Tinea fuscipunctella Haworth, 1828

Diversity
- 12–13 species

Synonyms
- "Tineidia" Zagulayev, 1960 (nomen nudum)

= Niditinea =

Genus of moths

Niditinea is a genus of the fungus moth family, Tineidae. Therein, it belongs to the nominate subfamily, Tineinae.

== Species ==
The 12 or 13 species currently placed in Niditinea are:

- Niditinea baryspilas (Meyrick, 1937) (= N. unipunctella)
- Niditinea contrariella Zeller, 1877
- Niditinea erschoffi Zagulayev, 1983
- Niditinea fuscella – brown-dotted clothes moth
- Niditinea nigrocapitella Zagulajev, 1960
- Niditinea orleansella (Chambers, 1873)
- Niditinea pallidorsella (Zeller, 1877)
- Niditinea piercella (Bentinck, 1935) (= N. ignotella (Zagulajev, 1956; non Walker, 1863: preoccupied), N. distinguenda. Sometimes in striolella)
- Niditinea praeumbrata (Meyrick, 1919) (= N. negreai, N. scotocleptes)
- Niditinea sinensis Petersen & Gaedike, 1993
- Niditinea striolella (Matsumura, 1931) (= N. pacifella, N. semidivisa)
- Niditinea truncicolella (Tengström, 1848) (= N. rosenbergerella)
- Niditinea tugurialis (Meyrick, 1932)
