= Johan Martin Jakob von Tengström =

Finnish entomologist

Johan Martin Jakob von Tengström (1821 in Åbo (Turku) – 1890) was a Finnish entomologist.

Tengström specialised in Lepidoptera. Tengström visited Java in 1849 where he discovered several new species of Lepidoptera. He made shorter trips within Europe. His collection is held by the Natural History Museum of Helsinki.

== Bibliography ==
- (1869) Catalogus Lepidopterorum Faunae Fennicae praecursorius. Not.Soc.Fauna Flora Fennica 10.
