= Copano Bay Fishing Pier =

Former recreational fishing pier

Coordinates: 28°7′14″N 97°1′11″W

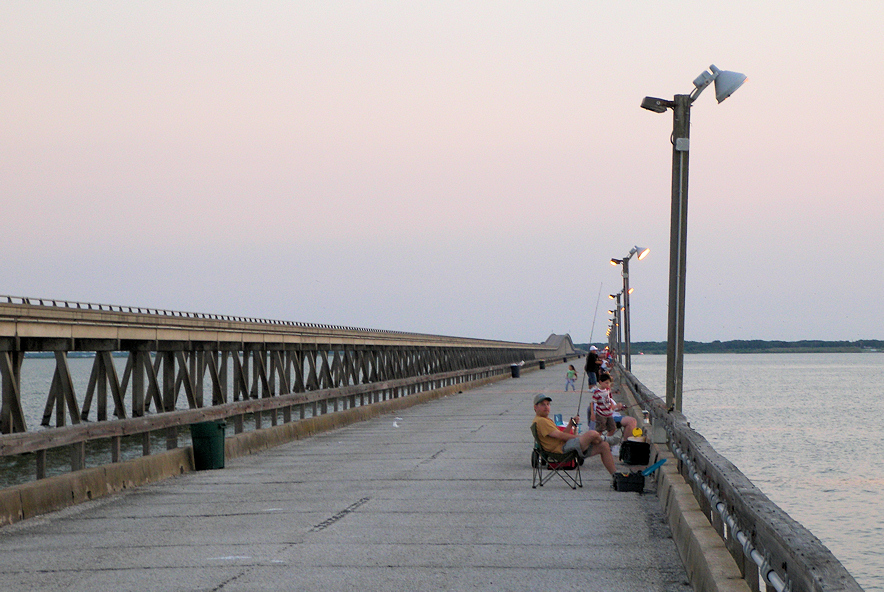
Sunset at the Copano Bay Fishing Pier

The Copano Bay Fishing Pier was a pier in Aransas County, Texas, United States used primarily for recreational fishing. The pier had two separate sections. One is 2,500 feet (760 m) long on the south side of the bay and the other is 6,190 feet (1,890 m) long on the north side. It was permanently closed in August 2017 following a collapse of one section and inspections which indicated severe deterioration of the over 80-year-old structure.

The pier was originally the causeway across Copano Bay for State Highway 35. In 1967, a new causeway opened and the old one was closed to vehicular traffic. The new causeway had a higher middle section than the old one, so the old middle section was removed to allow for passage of larger ships which left the two piers.

The State Department of Highways and Public Transportation (Now part of the Texas Department of Transportation) transferred ownership of the pier to the Texas Parks and Wildlife Department (TPWD) and the pier became a 5.9 acres (2.4 ha) state park. On November 1, 2005, TPWD transferred control of the pier to the Aransas County Navigation District No.1 (ACND).

In 2013, the popular pier, open twenty-four hours a day, is the subject of a segment of Bob Phillips' syndicated television anthology series, Texas Country Reporter.
