= Dairy Queen =

American multinational fast food chain

International Dairy Queen, Inc.
- Logo used since 2007 (2001 for Grill & Chill)

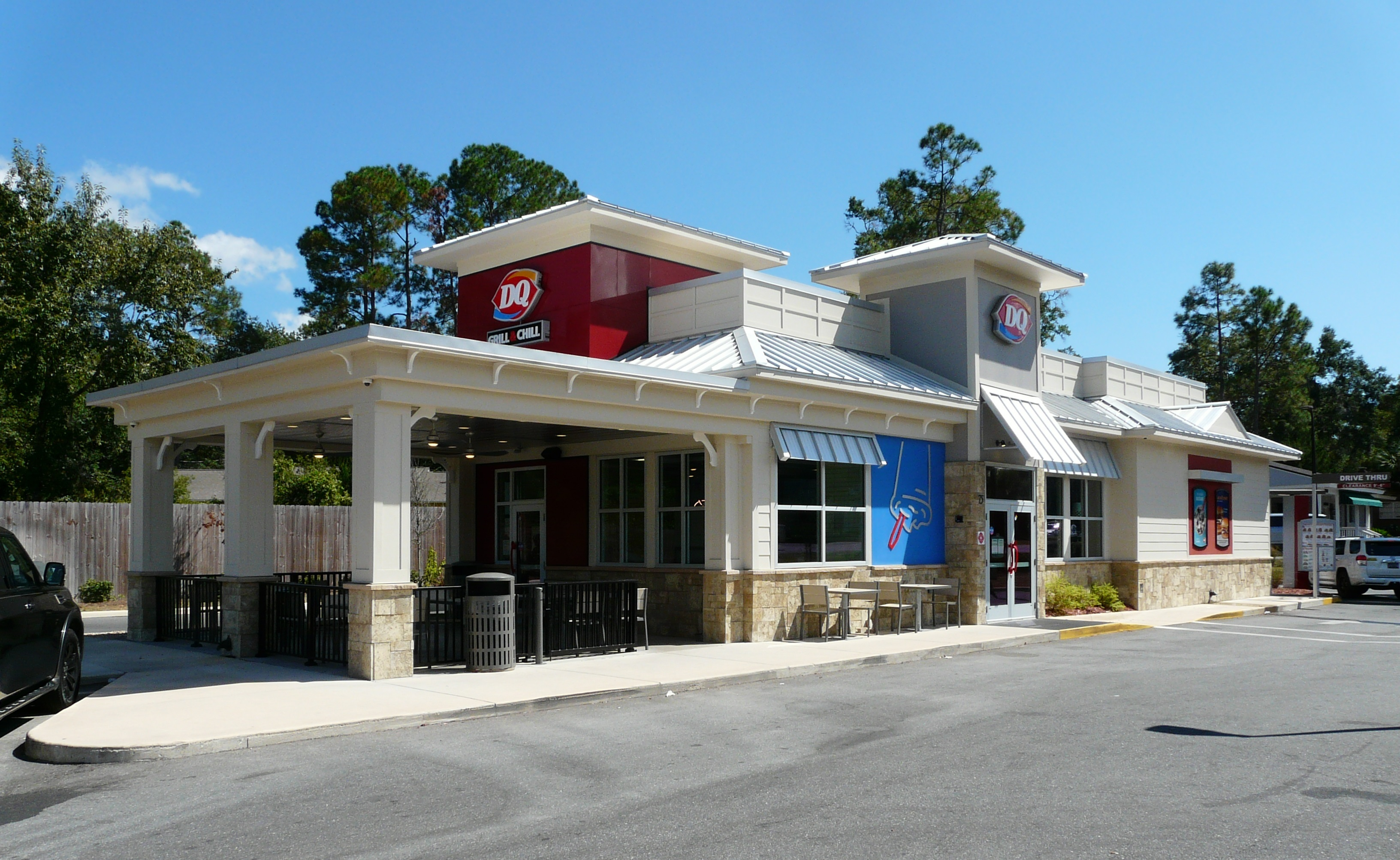
- A modern Dairy Queen restaurant in Crawfordville, Florida, United States
- Trade name: Dairy Queen; DQ
- Type: Subsidiary
- Industry: Restaurant
- Genre: Ice cream parlor Fast food
- Founded: June 22, 1940; 86 years ago in Joliet, Illinois, US
- Founders: John Fremont McCullough; Alex McCullough; Sherb Noble
- Headquarters: Bloomington, Minnesota, United States
- Number of locations: 4,455 (US domestic, 2018); 6,800 (global)
- Area served: United States, Bahamas, Bahrain, Brunei, Cambodia, Canada, China, Guyana, Indonesia, Kuwait, Laos, Mexico, Panama, Philippines, Qatar, Taiwan, Thailand, Trinidad and Tobago, Vietnam, Puerto Rico
- Key people: Troy Bader (president and CEO)
- Products: Soft serve, milkshakes, cakes, sundaes, hamburgers, hot dogs, chicken, chicken strips, french fries, cheese curds, onion rings, soft drinks, salads
- Revenue: $3.64 billion (US, 2017)
- Parent: Berkshire Hathaway
- Subsidiaries: American Dairy Queen; Dairy Queen Canada; Orange Julius
- Website: dairyqueen.com

International Dairy Queen, Inc. (DQ) is an American multinational fast food restaurant chain founded in 1940 and headquartered in Bloomington, Minnesota. The first Dairy Queen was owned and operated by Sherb Noble and opened on June 22, 1940, in Joliet, Illinois. It serves a variety of hot and fried food, as well as original frozen dairy products that vary from location to location.

The company has been owned by Berkshire Hathaway since 1998.

== History ==
=== First store ===
The soft-serve formula was first developed in 1938 by John Fremont "J. F." McCullough and his son Alex. They convinced friend and loyal customer Sherb Noble to offer the product in his ice cream store in Kankakee, Illinois. On the first day of sales, Noble sold more than 1,600 servings of the new dessert within two hours. Noble and the McCulloughs went on to open the first Dairy Queen store in 1940 in Joliet, Illinois. It closed in the 1950s, but the 501 N Chicago Street building is a city-designated landmark.

=== 1940s to 1960s ===
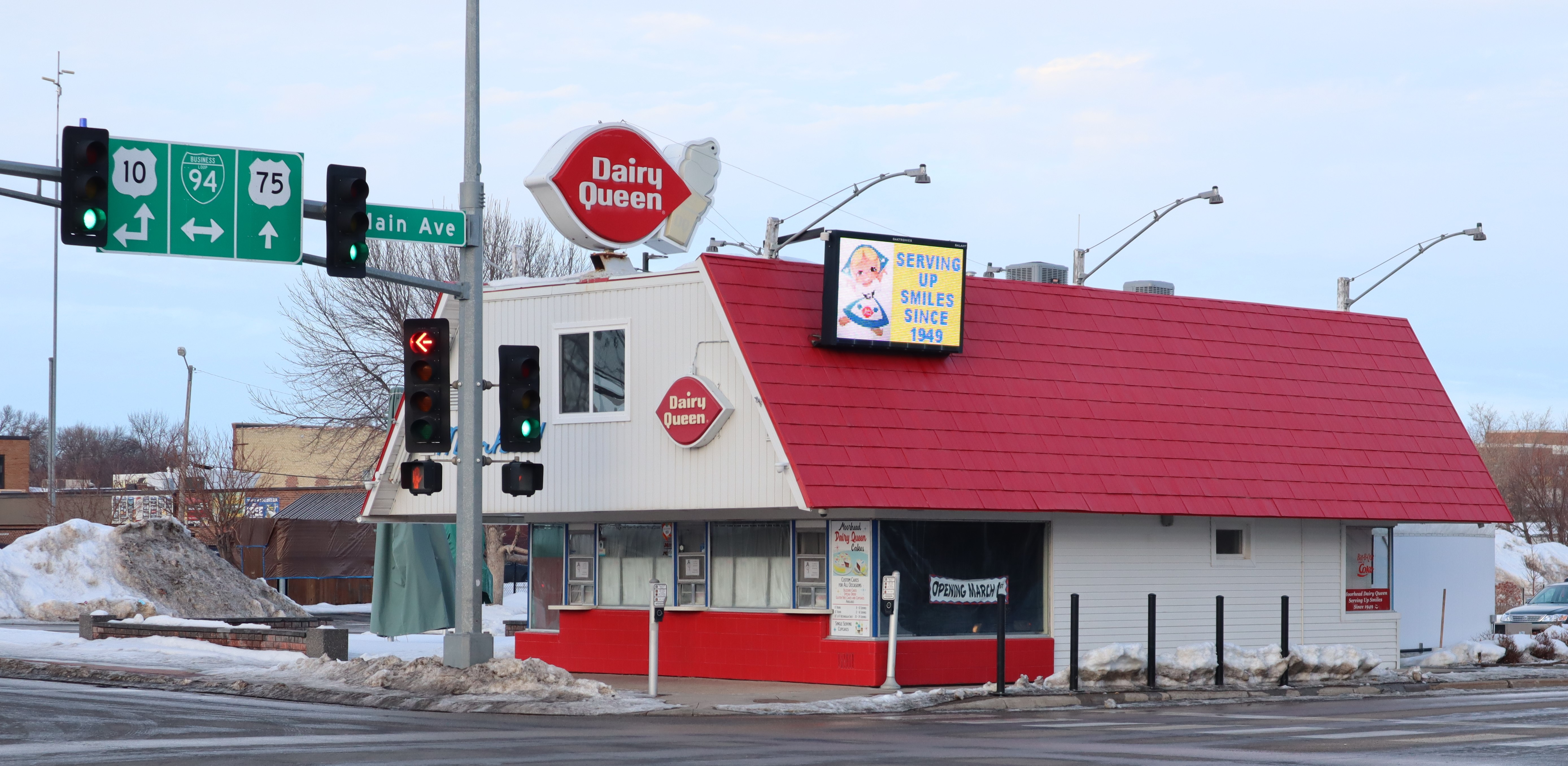
DQ in Moorhead, Minnesota, United States, built in 1949

Since 1940, the chain has used a franchise system to expand its operations globally. The first ten stores in 1941 grew to 100 by 1947, 1,446 in 1950, and 2,600 in 1955. Canada's first location was at a "quick freeze plant" in Melville, Saskatchewan, 1952, followed by a standalone store in Estevan in 1953. The oldest surviving freestanding location opened in Port Colborne, 1954.

To compete with fast food chains, many Dairy Queen owners added hamburgers, hot dogs, and french fries to their menus. The Brazier system, introduced in Georgia in 1958, featured broiled hamburgers and hot dogs and later became the national standard for Dairy Queen menus. It was developed by Dairy Queen operator Jim Cruikshank, who chose the name Brazier "after he decided the charcoal broiler was the way he wanted to prepare his burger line," said DQ vice president Lane Schmiesing.

The company became International Dairy Queen, Inc. (IDQ) in 1962. IDQ is the parent company of American Dairy Queen Corporation (often abbreviated "Am. D.Q. Corp." in the chain's legal disclaimers), Dairy Queen Canada Inc., and other entities that franchise the Dairy Queen concept.

Dairy Queens were a fixture of social life in small Midwestern and Southern United States towns during the 1950s and 1960s. They have often been reflected in stories and memoirs of small-town America, as in Walter Benjamin at the Dairy Queen: Reflections at Sixty and Beyond by Larry McMurtry, Dairy Queen Days by Robert Inman, Chevrolet Summers, Dairy Queen Nights by Bob Greene, and The Outsiders by S. E. Hinton including the film adaptation by Francis Ford Coppola.

=== 1980s to present ===
In 1987, IDQ bought the Orange Julius chain. IDQ was acquired by Berkshire Hathaway in 1998. In the 1990s, investors bought Dairy Queen stores that were individually owned, intending to increase profitability through economies of scale. Vasari, LLC became the second-largest Dairy Queen operator in the country and operated 70 Dairy Queens across Texas, Oklahoma, and New Mexico. When stores were not profitable, the firm closed them. On October 30, 2017, Vasari LLC filed for bankruptcy and announced it was closing 29 DQ stores, including ten in the Texas Panhandle.

Thailand once had only one Dairy Queen outlet, still opened as of 1989.

In the US, the state with the most Dairy Queen restaurants is Texas. Using the 2010 census, the state with the most Dairy Queen restaurants per person is Minnesota. At the end of fiscal year 2014, Dairy Queen reported over 6,400 stores in more than 25 countries; about 4,500 of them (approximately 70%) were in the United States.

== Stores ==
The company's stores are operated under several brands, all bearing the Dairy Queen logo and carrying the company's signature soft-serve. "Brazier" locations, with expanded food menus and second floors for storage, are recognizable by their red mansard roofs.

By the end of 2014, Dairy Queen had more than 6,400 stores in 27 countries, including more than 1,400 outside the United States and Canada.

The largest Dairy Queen in the US is in Bloomington, Illinois. The largest in the world is in Riyadh, Saudi Arabia.

=== Standard stores ===
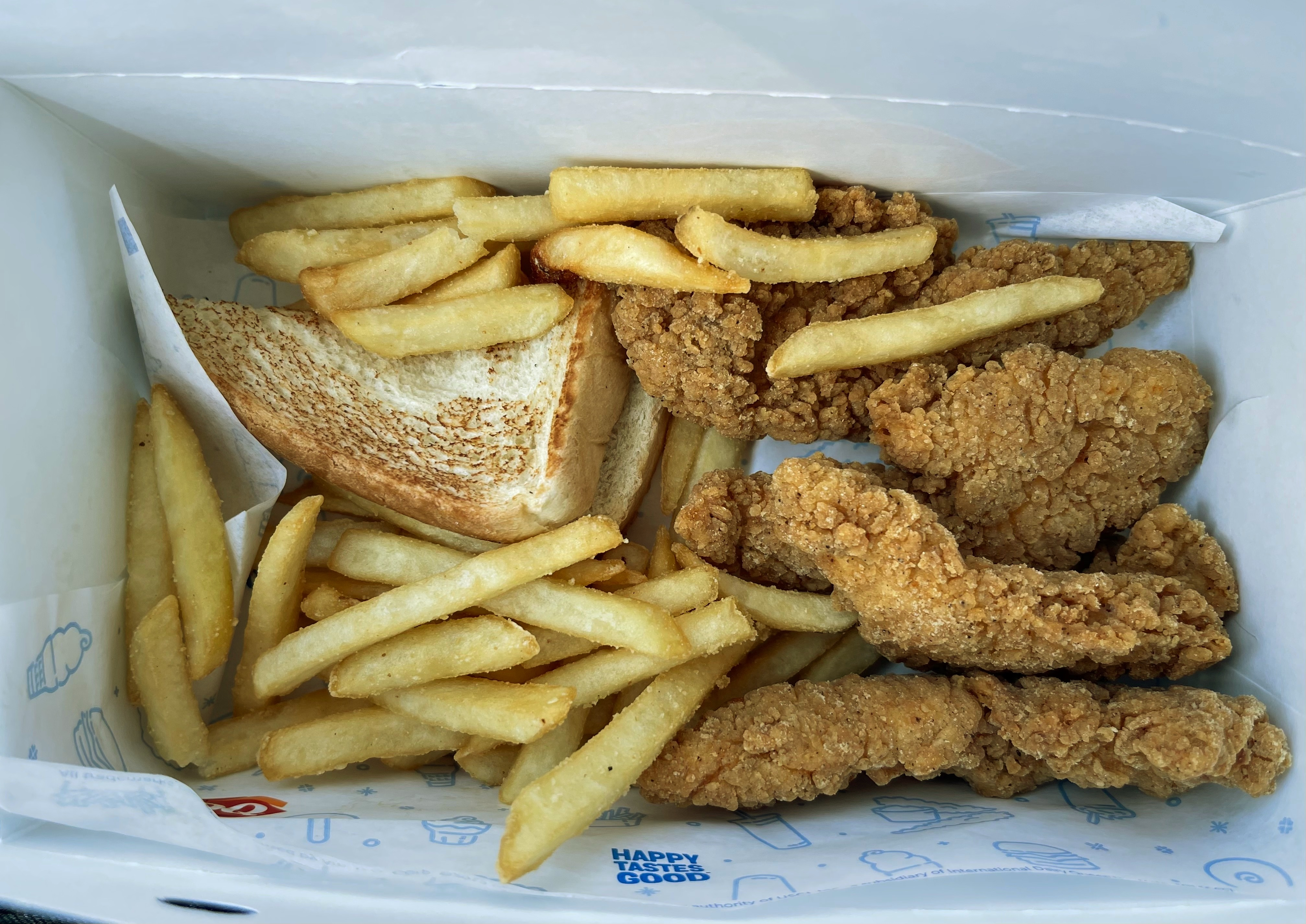
A Chicken Strip Basket from Dairy Queen with four chicken strips, french fries and Texas toast

While some stores serve a very abbreviated menu primarily featuring DQ frozen treats and may be open only during spring, summer, and fall, most DQ restaurants also serve hot food and are open year-round.

So-called "Limited Brazier" locations may additionally offer hot dogs, barbecue beef (or pork) sandwiches, and in some cases french fries and chicken, but not hamburgers. Dairy Queen Full Brazier restaurants serve a typical fast-food menu featuring burgers, french fries, grilled and crispy chicken, frozen treats, and hot dogs.

In some locations built in the 1990s, the "Hot Eats, Cool Treats" slogan can be seen printed on windows or near the roof of the building.

=== Franchise background ===
The liquid capital required to invest in a Dairy Queen franchise is $400,000, and a minimum net worth is $750,000. The initial franchise fee is $45,000, while the total investment amount required ranges from $1.5 million to $2.5 million. There are 5,700 operating Dairy Queen units. In addition to the upfront investment costs, the royalty fee for Dairy Queen franchisees is 4%, and the advertisement royalty fee is 5-6%. The franchise term of agreement lasts for 20 years, and the contract is renewable.

Dairy Queen does not offer in-house financing options; they provide only third-party financing. This third-party financing covers the franchise fee, startup costs, equipment, inventory, accounts receivable, and payroll.

=== DQ / Orange Julius ===
They were also known as the "Treat Center" concept, an enhanced version of the original stores also serves drinks and foods from the Orange Julius menu. This was the company's preferred concept for new, small-scale locations, primarily in shopping malls food courts. Some early Treat Centers also included popcorn retailer Karmelkorn.

=== DQ Grill & Chill ===
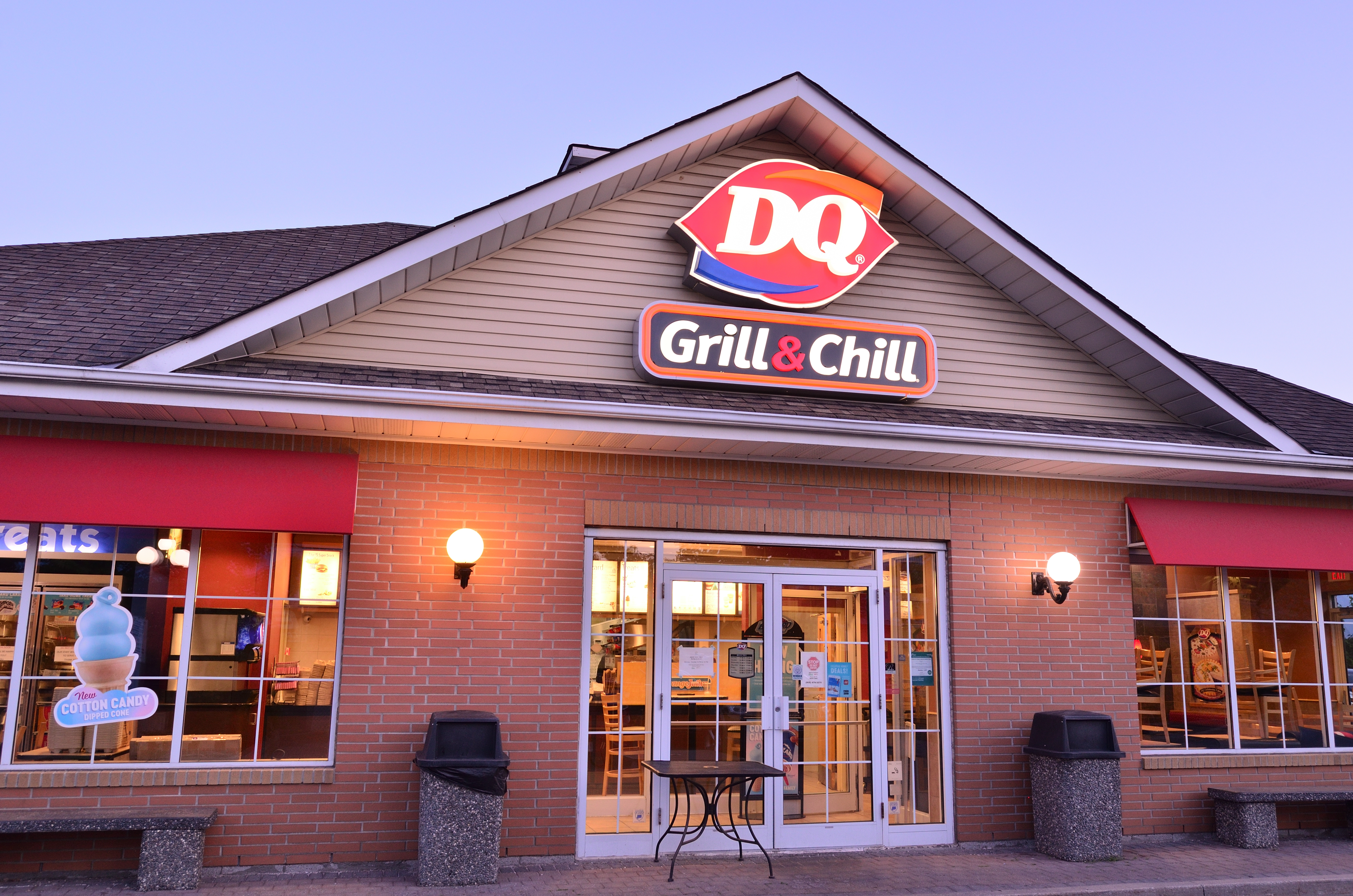
A DQ Grill & Chill in Canada

DQ Grill & Chill locations feature hot food, treats, table delivery, and self-serve soft drinks. It is the new concept for new and renovated full-service restaurants. Stores are larger than older-style locations and feature a completely new store design. They usually offer an expanded menu, including breakfast, GrillBurgers, grilled sandwiches, and limited table service (customers still place orders at the counter). They also contain self-serve soft drink fountains allowing free refills. In December 2001, Chattanooga, Tennessee, was the site of the first two Dairy Queen Grill and Chill restaurants in the United States. The nation's largest DQ Grill & Chill is located in Bloomington, Illinois.

=== Texas Country Foods ===
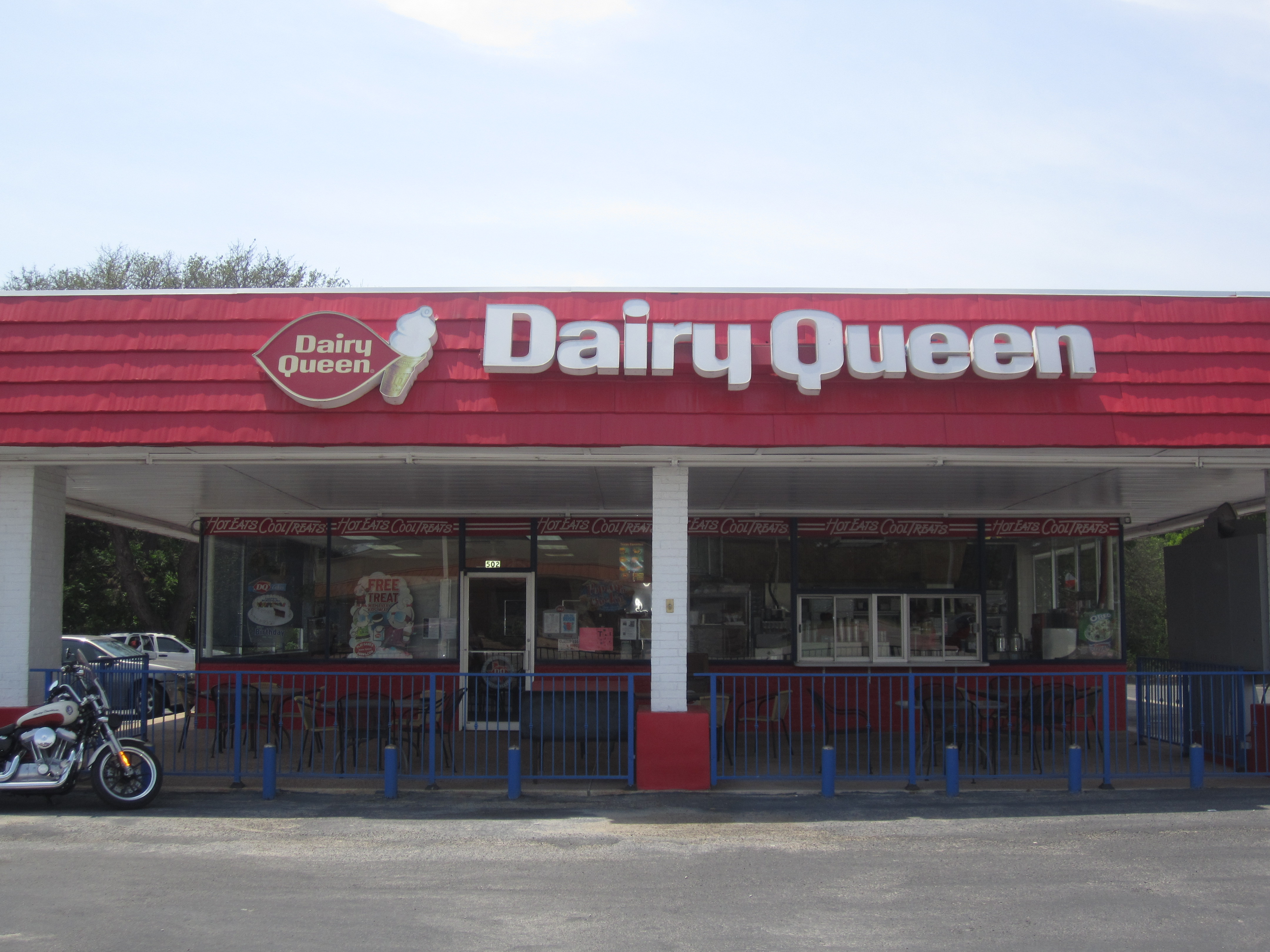
A Dairy Queen outlet in Burnet, Texas, United States, using the chain's previous logo

All Texas locations, including those that otherwise resemble the Brazier or DQ Grill & Chill formats, use a separate hot food menu branded as Texas Country Foods. Among other differences, "Hungr-Buster" burgers are available instead of the Brazier and GrillBurger offerings. Other food offerings not found outside Texas include the "Dude" chicken-fried steak sandwich, steak finger country baskets, T-Brand tacos, and a one-half pound double meat hamburger, the "BeltBuster."

Texas is home to the largest number of Dairy Queens in the U.S. All Texas Dairy Queen restaurants are owned and operated by franchisees. The Texas Dairy Queen Operators' Council (TDQOC) runs a separate marketing website from the national website. Bob Phillips, host of the popular Texas syndicated television series Texas Country Reporter, was for many years the DQ spokesman in Texas, as the restaurant was a co-sponsor of the program at the time.

== Products ==
The company's products expanded to include malts and milkshakes in 1950, banana splits in 1951, Dilly Bars in 1955 (introduced to the franchise by Robert Litherland, the co-owner of a store in Moorhead, Minnesota), a range of hamburgers and other cooked foods under the Brazier banner in 1958, Mr. Misty slush treats in 1961 (later renamed Misty Slush, then again to Arctic Rush; as of 2017, DQ again calls them Misty Slush, as seen on dairyqueen.com), and Jets, Curly Tops, Freezes in 1964. In 1962, the Buster Bar, consisting of vanilla soft serve in the shape of a small cup with a layer of and covered with peanuts and chocolate, was invented by David Skjerven in Grafton, North Dakota. In 1971, the Peanut Buster Parfait, consisting of peanuts, hot fudge, and vanilla soft serve, was introduced by Forrest 'Frosty' Chapman in his St. Peter, Minnesota Franchise. In 1990, the Breeze, a dessert like a Blizzard but was made with non-fat, cholesterol-free yogurt, was launched. This was pulled from stores in 2000. In 1995, the Chicken Strip Basket was introduced, consisting of chicken strips, Texas toast (only in the US), fries, and cream gravy (gravy in Canada). Other items include sundaes and the blended coffee drink, the MooLatte.

DQ does not use the term "ice cream" in reference to its frozen dairy products. US Food and Drug Administration labeling regulations for ice cream require a minimum standard of 10% butterfat content, and DQ's soft-serve contains only 5% butterfat.

Dairy Queen frozen treats

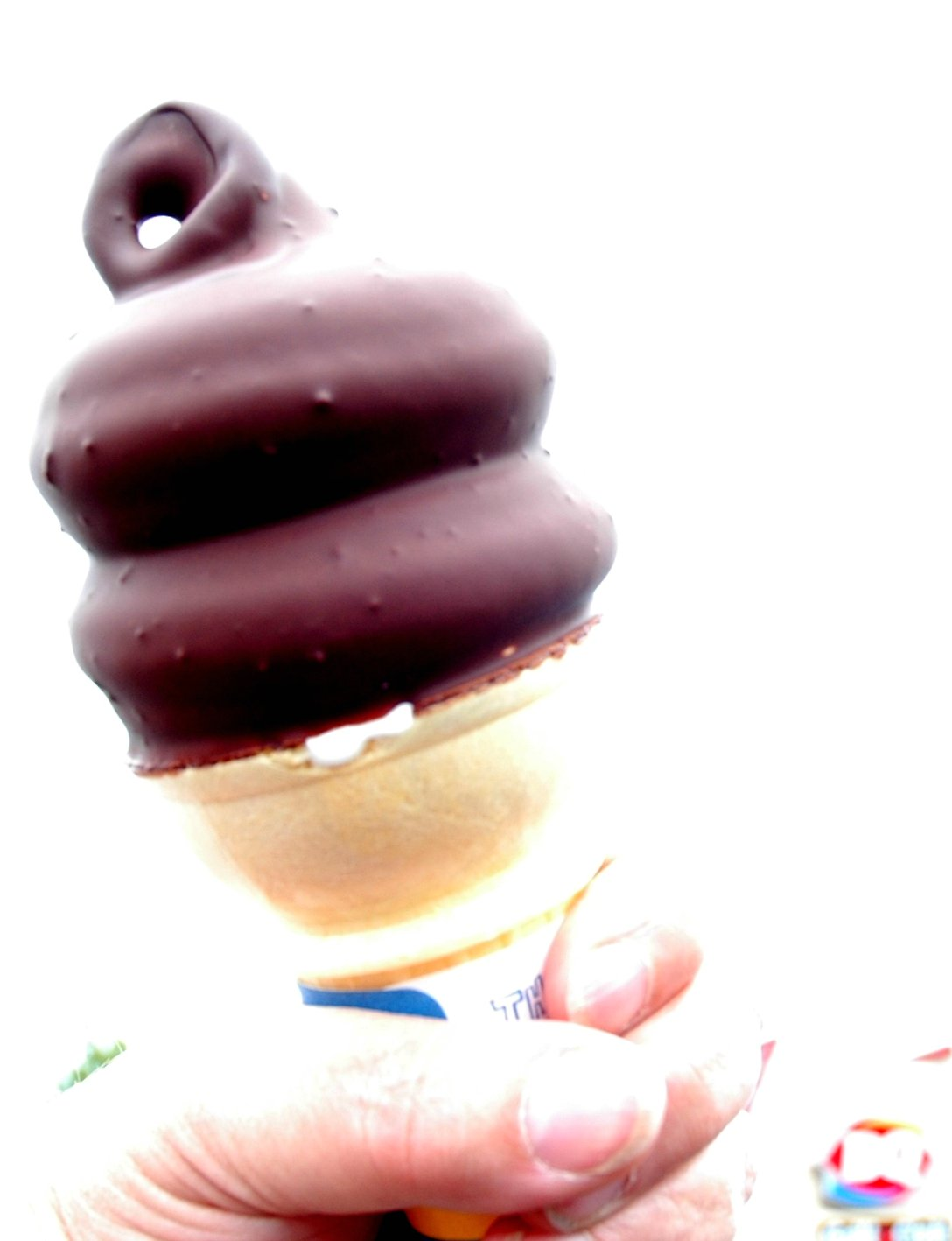
Chocolate-dipped soft-serve cone

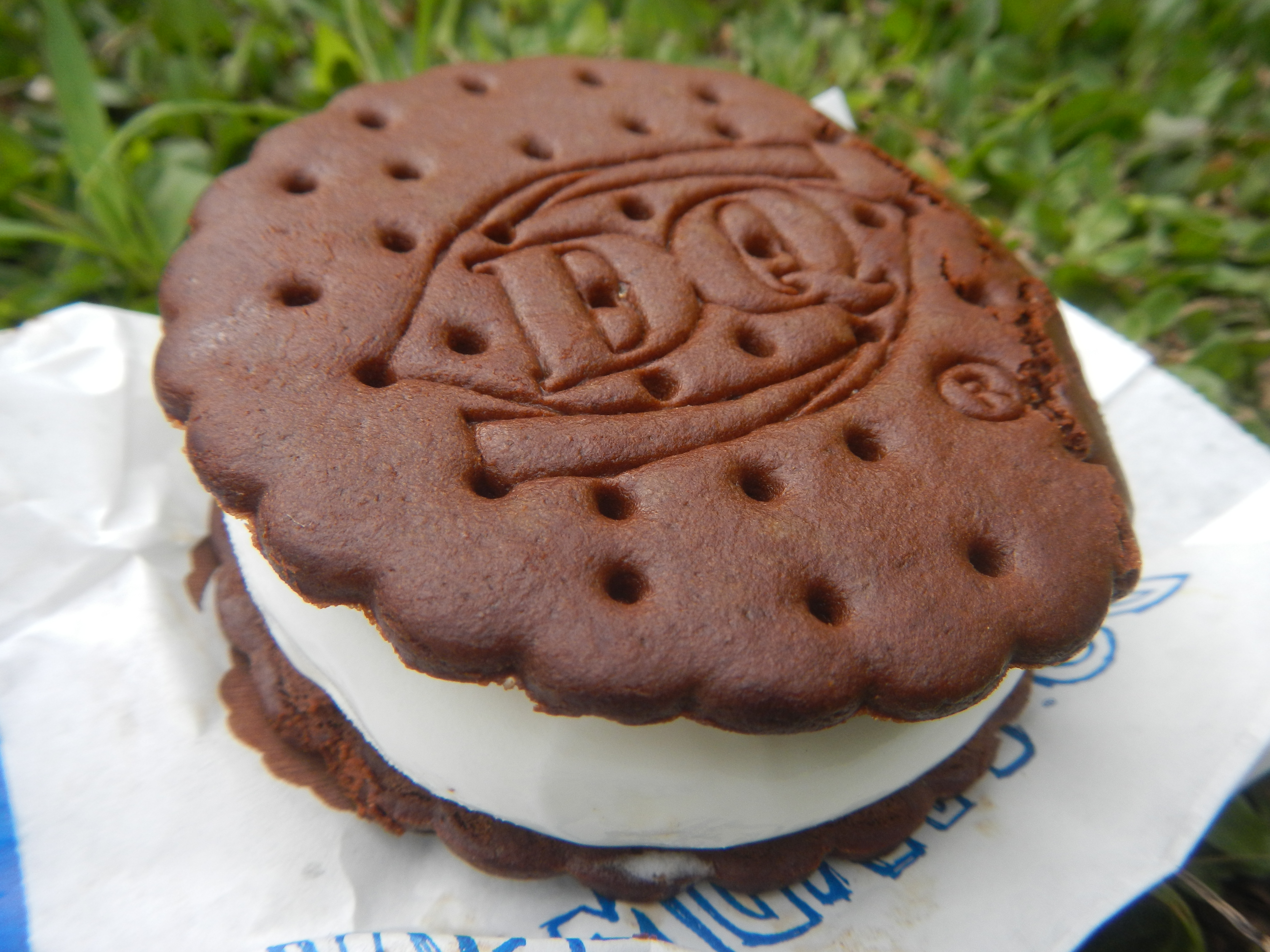
Ice cream sandwich

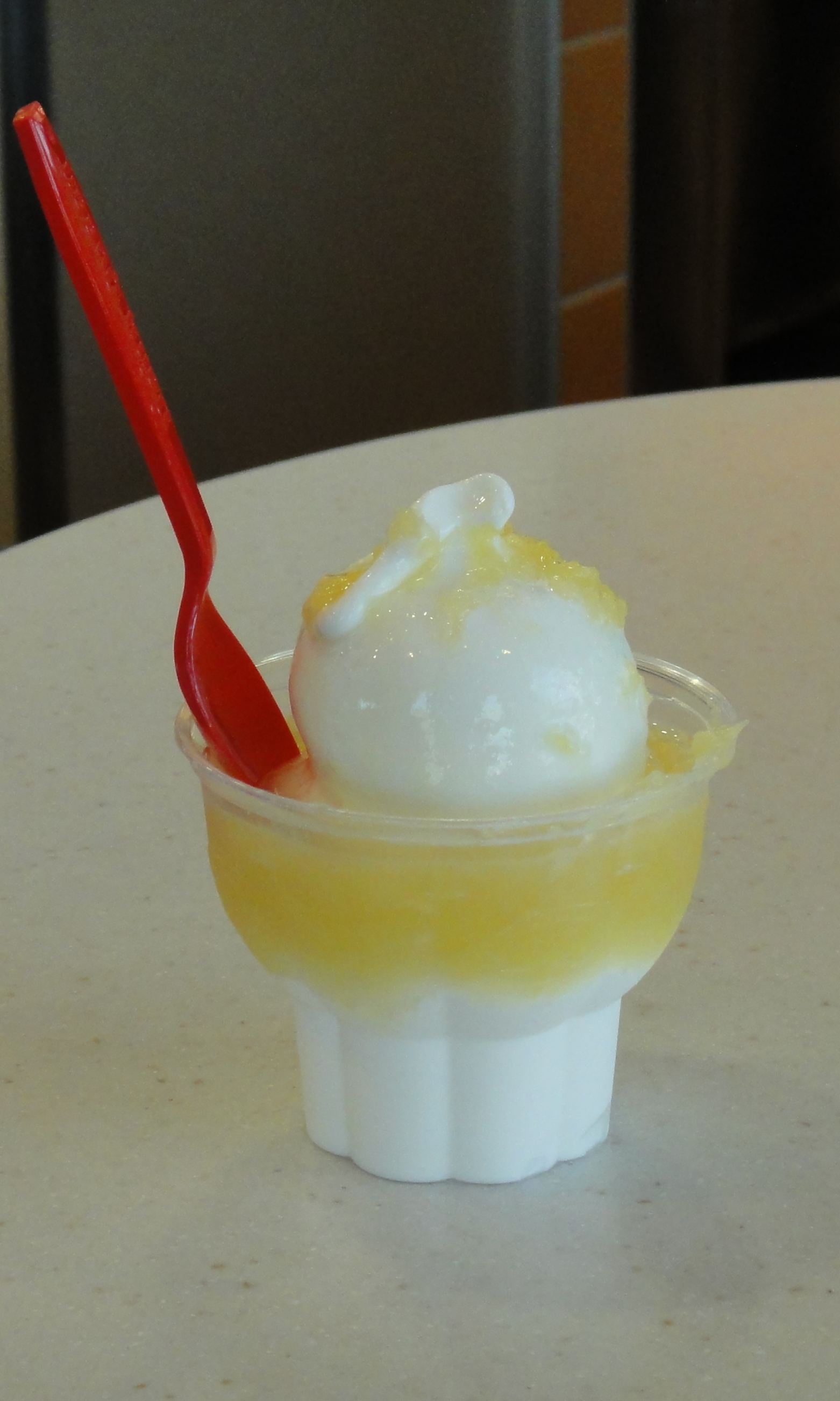
Pineapple sundae

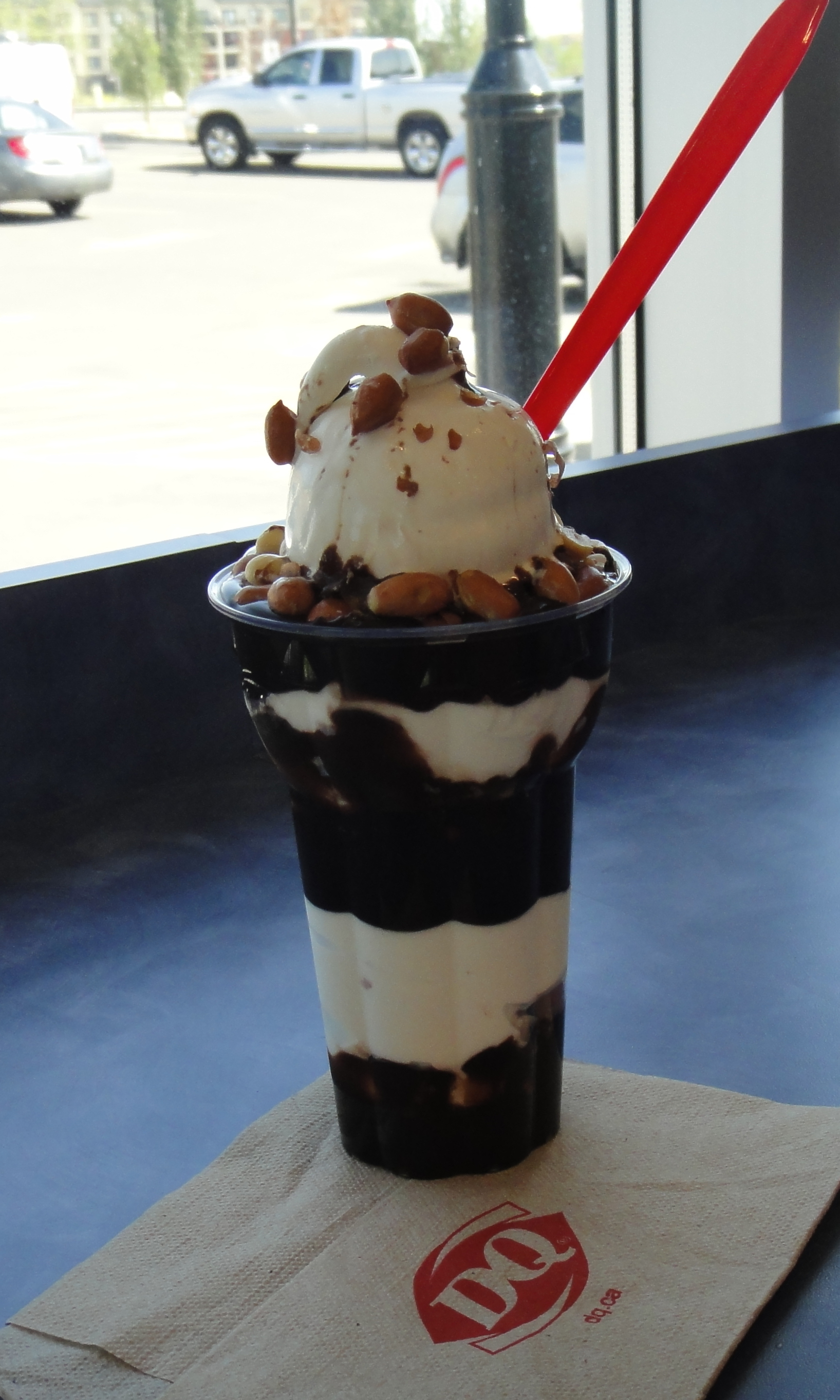
Peanut Buster Parfait

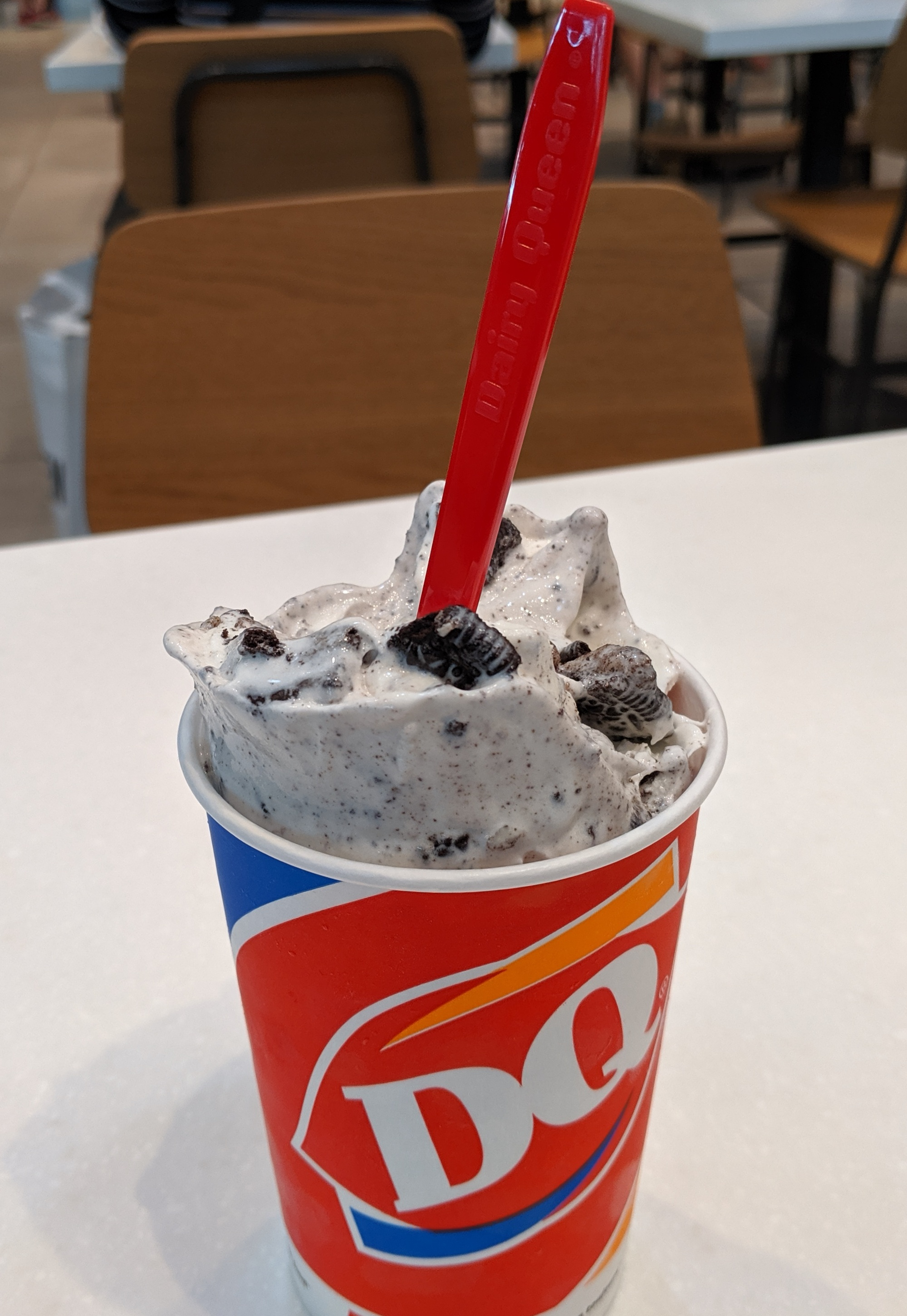
Oreo cookie Blizzard

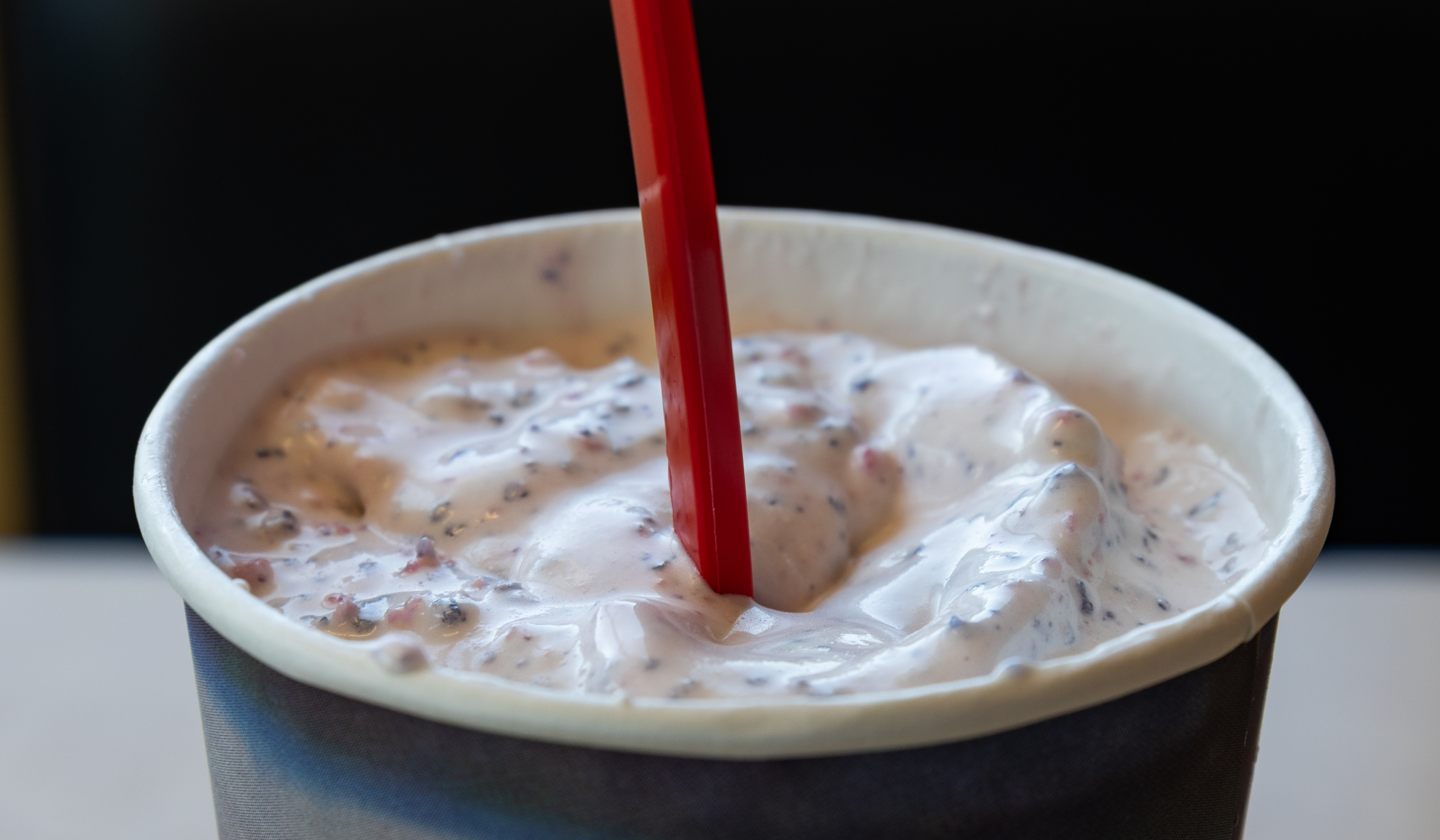
Close up of Blizzard

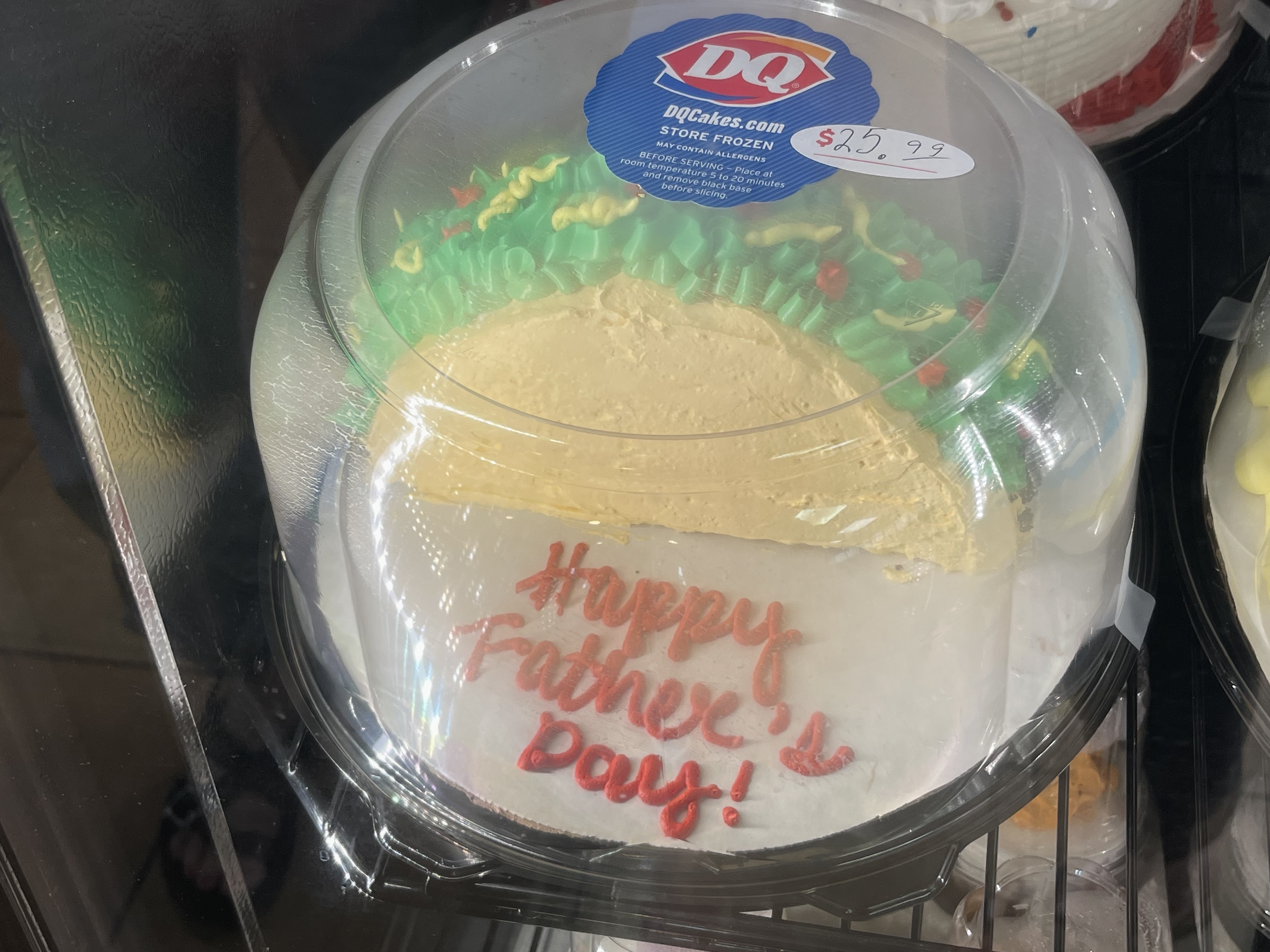
Ice cream cake

=== Blizzard ===
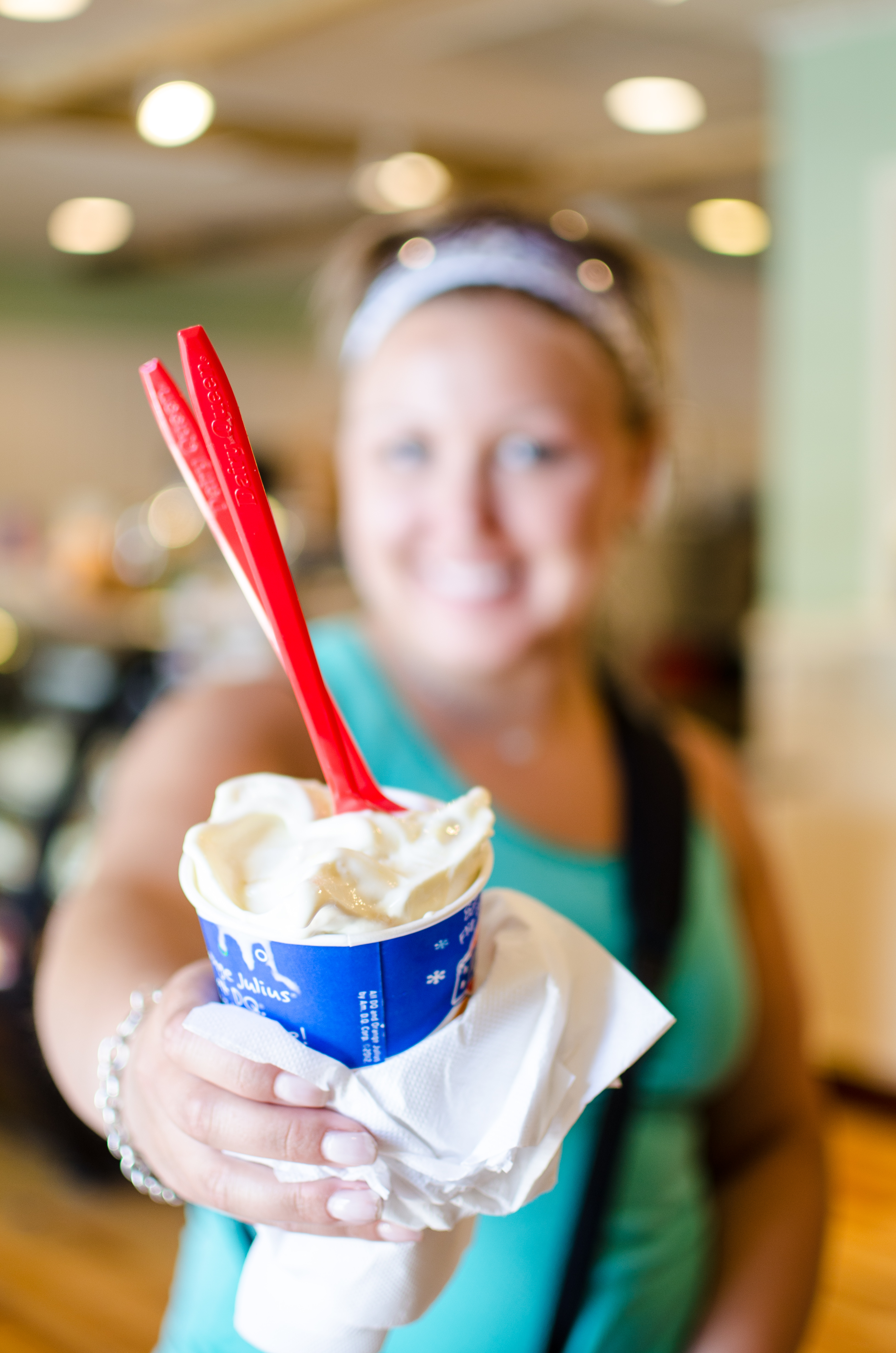
A woman holding a Banana Cream Pie Blizzard

A popular Dairy Queen item is the Blizzard, which is soft serve mechanically blended with mix-in ingredients such as sundae toppings and/or pieces of cookies, brownies, or candy. It has been a staple on the menu since its introduction in 1985, a year in which Dairy Queen sold more than 100 million Blizzards. Popular flavors include Oreo cookies, chocolate chip cookie dough, M&M's, Reese's Peanut Butter Cups, Heath Bar (Skor in Canada), and Butterfinger (Crispy Crunch in Canada). In Canada, a Smarties Blizzard is also available; it was temporarily discontinued in 2015 but re-added to the menu in 2018. Seasonal flavors are also available such as October's pumpkin pie and June's cotton candy. It has been argued that Dairy Queen drew its inspiration from the concrete served by the St. Louis-based Ted Drewes. On July 26, 2010, Dairy Queen introduced a new "mini" size Blizzard, served in 6 oz. cups. During the 25th anniversary of the Blizzard, two special flavors were released: Strawberry Golden Oreo Blizzard and Buster Bar Blizzard. Salted Caramel Truffle was released in 2015 during the Blizzard's 30th anniversary and Dairy Queen's 75th anniversary, but it has since been removed from the menu. Dairy Queen has featured over 170 different Blizzard flavors since its introduction in 1985.

Blizzards derive their name from being so thoroughly cold and thick that the cup can be held upside down after serving without any of the contents falling out. Employees will frequently demonstrate this to customers. There is a company policy that one Blizzard per order will be flipped upside-down by the employee. If this does not occur, the customer may request a coupon for a free Blizzard to use on their next visit, though this is at the franchise owner's discretion.

Dairy Queen had served conventional "thick" milkshakes called "Blizzards" in the 1960s. This time period also introduced the contemporary custom of flipping the shake upside down when served to the customer. Selling for the premium price of 50 cents in 1962, the original "Blizzards" invented by Samuel Temperato were available in traditional flavors such as vanilla, chocolate, and strawberry, with added malt on request.

In addition, Dairy Queen offers a Blizzard Cake in flavors such as Oreo and Reese's. Much like the restaurant's conventional "DQ cake", this variation is aimed toward celebrations and birthdays.

=== Frozen yogurt ===
In 1990, Dairy Queen began offering frozen yogurt as a lower-calorie alternative to its soft serve. The product was named Breeze. According to a company representative, Dairy Queen's regular soft serve has 35 calories per ounce, whereas the frozen yogurt was 25 calories per ounce. However, in 2001, the company phased out the frozen yogurt option in all its stores, citing a lack of demand.

In 2011, International Dairy Queen Inc. filed a request for a preliminary injunction to stop Yogubliz Inc, a small California-based frozen yogurt chain, from selling "Blizzberry" and "Blizz Frozen Yogurt," alleging that the names could confuse consumers due to their similarity to Dairy Queen's Blizzard. U.S. District Judge R. Gary Klausner denied Dairy Queen's request.

=== Cage-free egg commitment ===
In May 2016, Dairy Queen committed to requiring suppliers in the United States and Canada to purchase eggs only from approved cage-free egg suppliers by 2025. In the U.S., 67 percent of shell eggs, liquid eggs, and proprietary DQ ingredients that contain eggs have either converted to cage-free or were reformulated to remove eggs as an ingredient since Dairy Queen made their commitment. In Canada, 39 percent of shell eggs, liquid eggs, and proprietary DQ ingredients that contain eggs have either converted to cage-free or were reformulated to remove eggs as an ingredient since Dairy Queen made their commitment.

Some consider cage-free egg production to be a more humane method of production than conventional methods representing the majority of current production in the United States and Canada. There is no mention of Dairy Queen's cage-free commitment in their restaurants outside of the US and Canada.

== Advertising ==
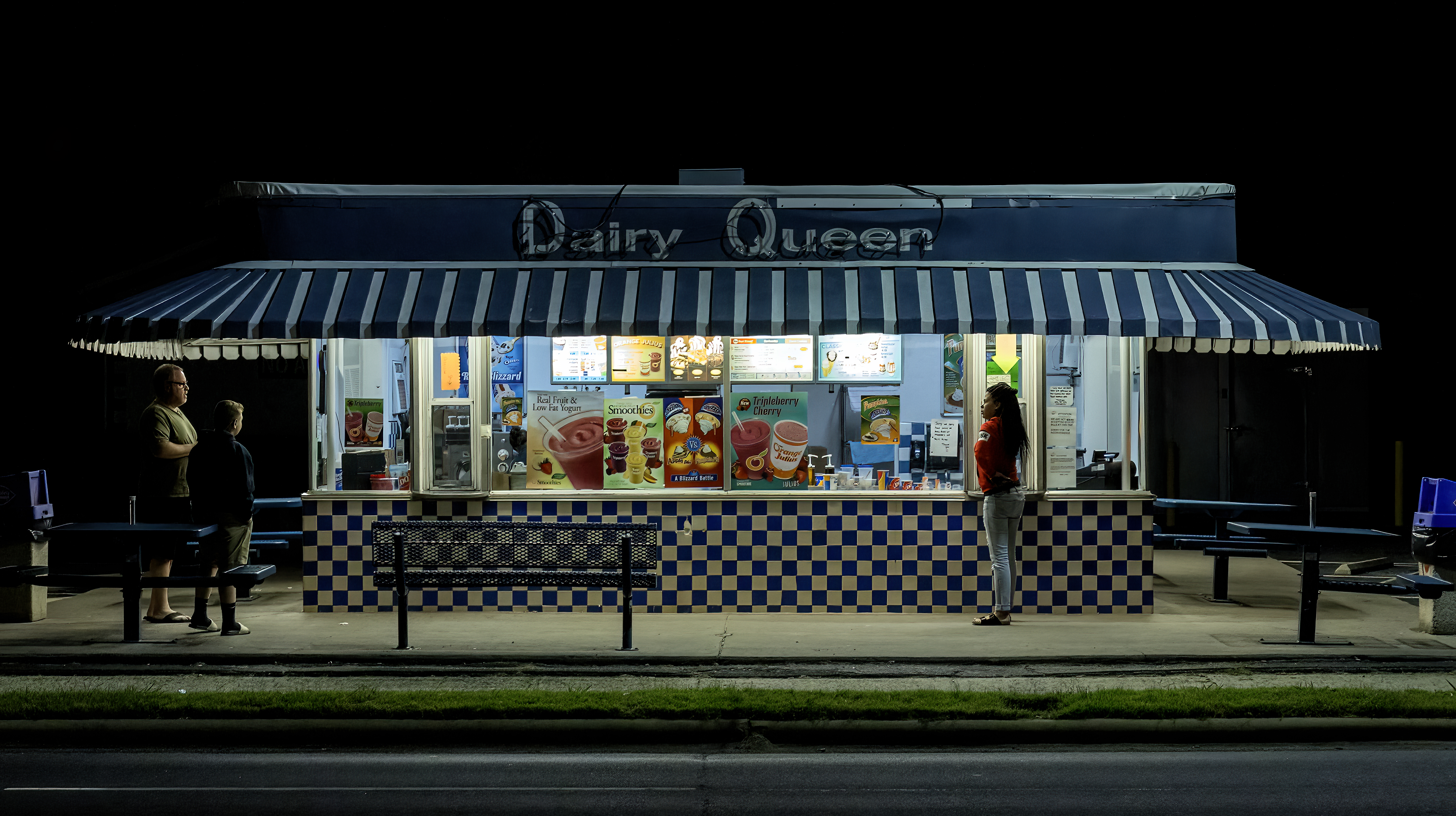
A walk-up Dairy Queen stand in Gastonia, North Carolina

"Little Miss Dairy Queen" began appearing in Pennsylvania signage in 1961. She had a Dutch bonnet, resembling the ellipse logo, with a pinafore apron over her dress and wooden shoes.

Characters from the Dennis the Menace comic strip appeared in Dairy Queen marketing from 1971 through 2002, when they were dropped because Dairy Queen felt the comic strip had become antiquated and children could no longer relate to the characters. From 2006 to July 2011, the advertising focused on a large mouth with its tongue licking its large lips, which morphs into the 2001-present Dairy Queen logo.

In Texas, at the end of advertisements, there is frequently a Texas flag waving, and the new DQ logo and slogan below saying, "Eat Like A Texan." Previous slogans include "That's what I like about Texas," "For Hot Eats & Cool Treats, Think DQ," "Nobody beats DQ Treats & Eats," "DQ is Value Country," and "This is DQ Country." These advertisements featured Texas Country Reporter host Bob Phillips as a spokesperson since his program was mainly sponsored by Dairy Queen. Early 1990s Dairy Queen Texas advertisements included a group of animal mascot characters called the Fun Bunch Munch, which included Kangachew the kangaroo, Hungrizzly the bear, and Chompanzee the chimpanzee, to advertise children's meals.

In 2015, Dairy Queen and model railroad company of Milwaukee, Wm. K. Walthers came out with a Walthers Cornerstone HO 1:87 Scale models of a restaurant – one from the 1950s with the original logo and one from 2007 with the current logo. The models are both officially licensed replicas.

=== Slogans ===
For many years, the franchise's slogan was "We treat you right." From 1979 until 1981, the restaurant chain used the slogan "It's a real treat!" During the early-to-mid 1990s, the slogans "Hot Eats, Cool Treats" and "Think DQ" were used and preceded the aforementioned line in the Dairy Queen jingle. Later on, it was changed to "Meet Me at DQ" and "DQ: Something Different." Another slogan, introduced in early 2011, was "So Good It's RiDQulous," with Dairy Queen's current logo infused in the word "ridiculous." In the mid-to-late 2010s, their slogan was "Fan Food, Not Fast Food."

=== Logos ===
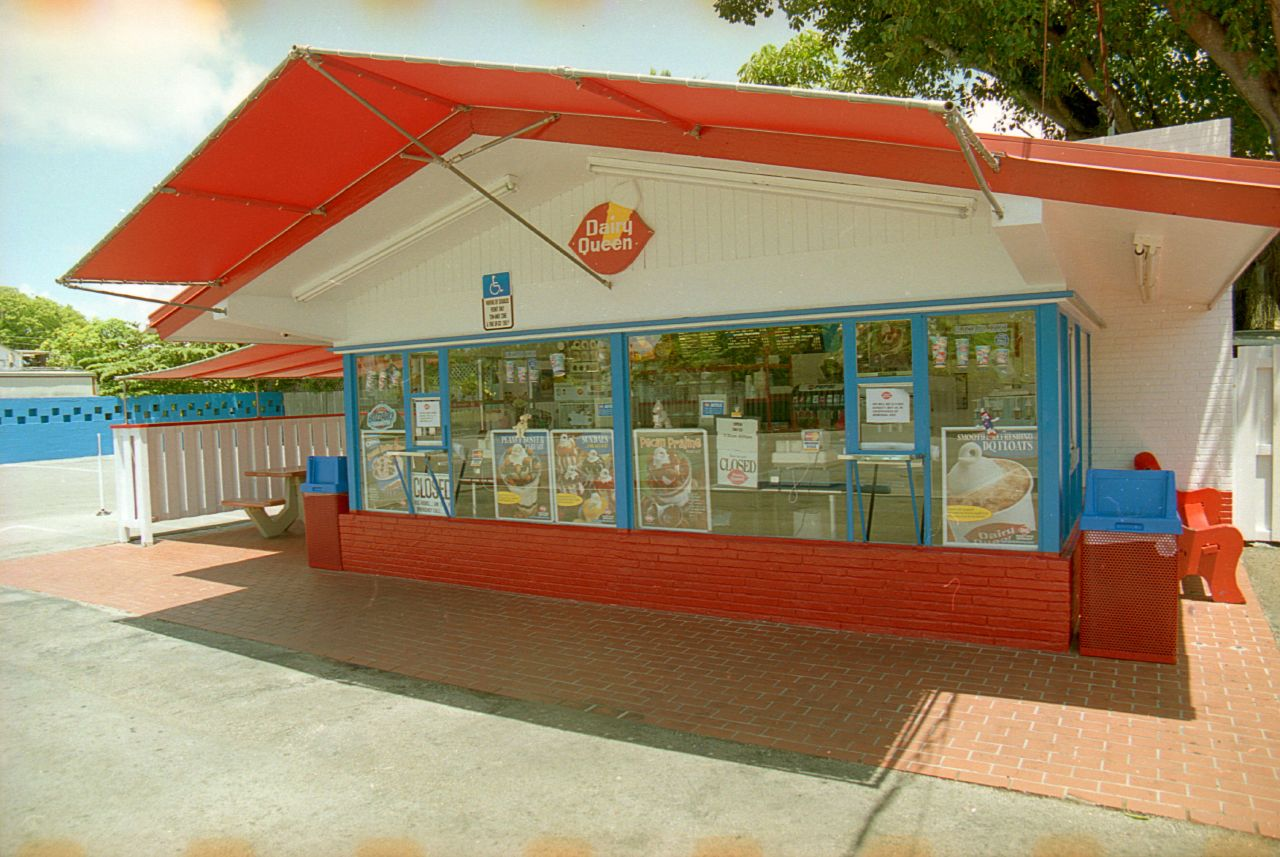
A Dairy Queen in Key West, Florida with the pre-2007 logo

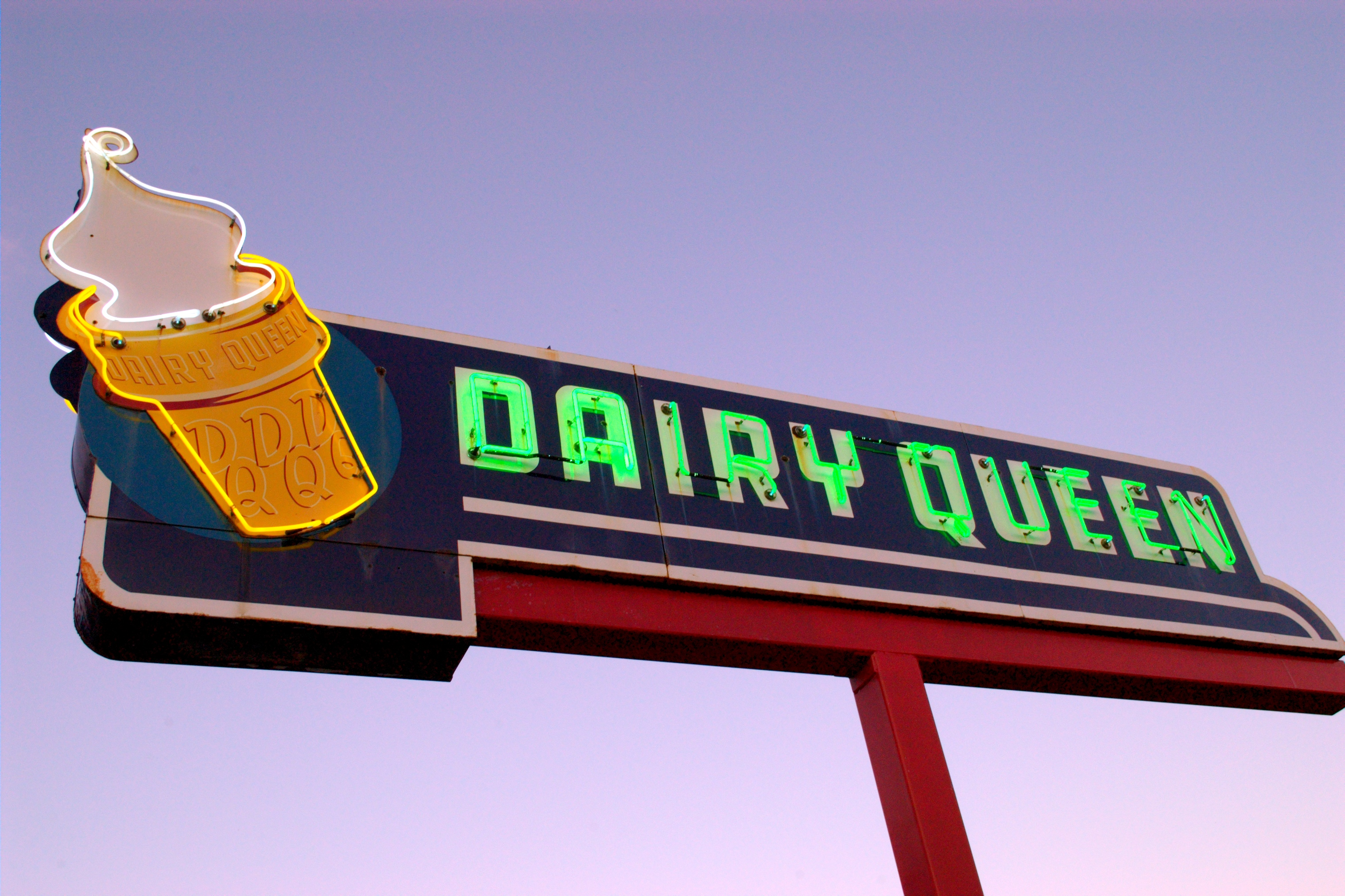
An outlet in Ottawa, Ontario used the original retro-style neon sign with a vanilla ice cream-filled cone until 2013.

The original Dairy Queen logo was simply a stylized text sign with a soft-serve cone at one end. In the late 1950s, the widely recognized red ellipse design was adopted. The initial shape was asymmetrical, with one of the side points having a greater extension than the other, especially when matched with the Brazier sign—a similarly sized yellow ovoid, tucked diagonally below its companion. By the 1970s, both sides were more closely matched, becoming symmetrical with the 2007 update (see online images for comparison). Some of the new 1950s signs continued to display a soft-serve cone jutting from the right side.

A yellow trapezoid Brazier sign, placed below the red Dairy Queen logo, was developed in the late 1960s. It matched the roofline of the new store design of the era.

The 1990s saw a new style of design, boxier with red strips containing the "Hot Eats, Cool Treats" slogan of the era near the roofline (some stores have removed this); straddling the center of the facade was a large blue sign that was a modernized take on the soft-serve cone design of the early 1950s, with white and red pinstripes trailing out from beneath the full Dairy Queen name, underneath the cone; the cone itself was now facing the building, to accommodate the physical ellipse logo; the sign continued further down the wall, with an angle and a "Brazier" logo strip. Additional cone signs were used to mark the entrance and exit of the store for drivers. This design was largely used on new stores but was sometimes used for remodeling older locations.

Although it had been used interchangeably with the Dairy Queen name for many decades, "DQ" became the company's official name in 2001. The font remained the same as in the original signage introduced 60 years prior. Throughout this period, the company placed the registered mark symbol immediately to the right, on the bottom side of the logo. When the company modernized its signage and logos in early 2007, it modified the font and italicized the letters, as well as adding arced lines, an orange one to represent its hot foods above and a blue one below to represent its soft serve products. In the new design, the registered mark symbol was moved to be adjacent to the letter "Q." The first overhaul of its logo in almost 70 years, the company claimed that the new logo would show brand growth and reflect the "fun and enjoyment" associated with its products. Advertising industry observers have noted that the new logo was an unneeded update of a known and trusted industry brand and that its new features were distracting.

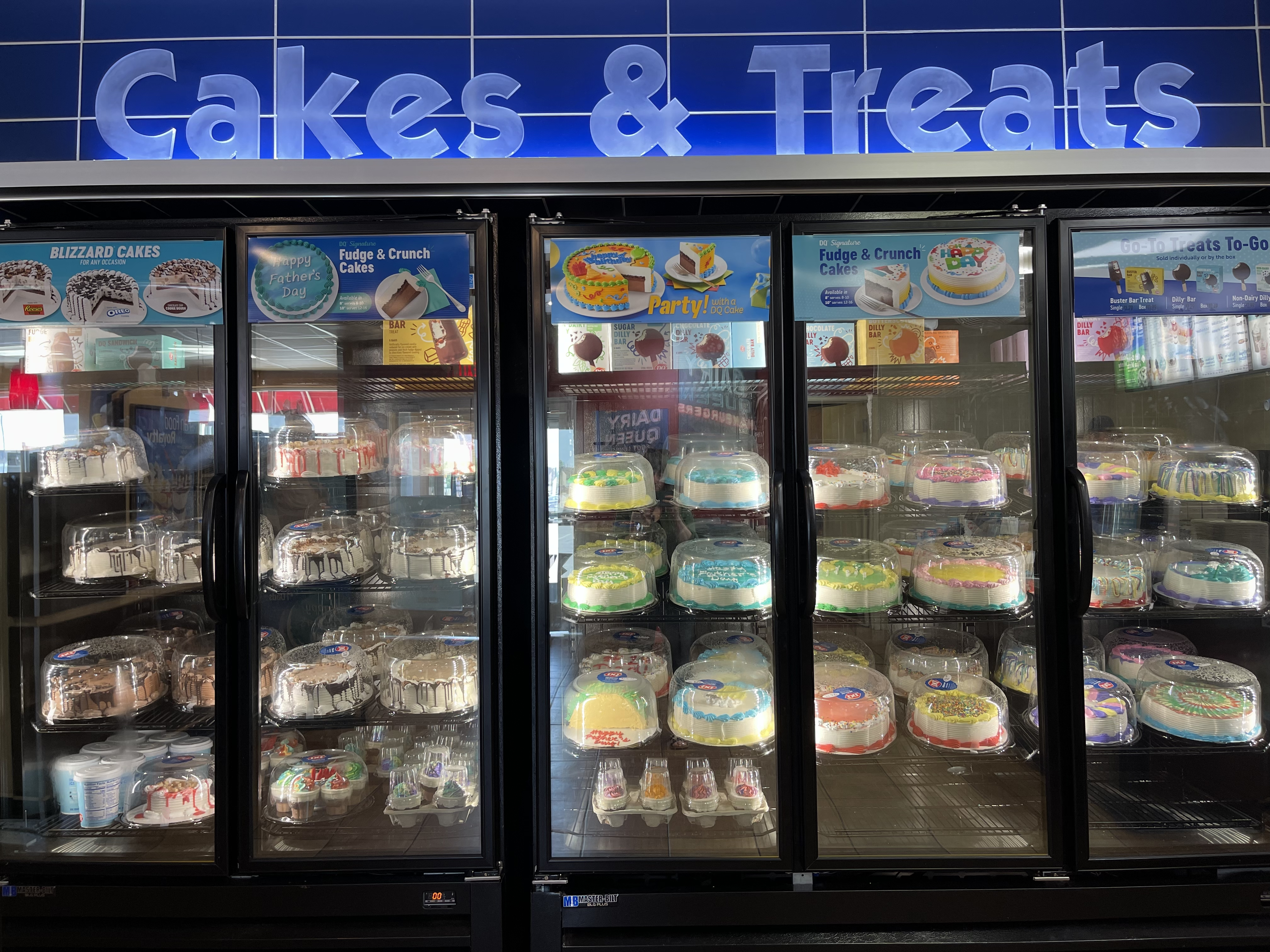
Frozen cakes and desserts at a Dairy Queen in Indianapolis, Indiana, United States, c. 2022

The original signage is still in use in older locations or in locations that use a "retro" motif in the property's design.

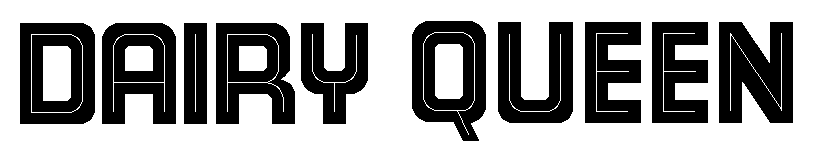
Early prototype Dairy Queen logo from 1950 to 1959, still in use at a small number of locations

1959–2007, secondary logo from 2001 to 2007, still in use at some locations, including Brazier locations

1965–2007, still in use at some locations

2001 (unused/prototype)

2001–present (Grill & Chill), 2007–present, current logo

== See also ==
- Fosters Freeze
- List of fast food restaurant chains
- List of hamburger restaurants
- List of hot dog restaurants
- Miracle Treat Day (Dairy Queen)
- Sonic Drive-In
