= Morir soñando =

Beverage of orange juice, milk, cane sugar and chopped ice

- Type: Mixed drink
- Ingredients: 2 cups (~480 mL) orange juice; 1/2 cup (~120 mL) of sugar; 4 cups (~960 mL) of evaporated milk; 2.5 cups (~600 mL) of crushed ice
- Standard garnish: None
- Served: shaken
- Preparation: Mix sugar and juice, and stir until all the sugar has dissolved. Add the ice to the juice and stir. Slowly add the evaporated milk, stirring constantly.

Morir soñando (lit. 'to die dreaming') is a popular beverage of the Dominican Republic which has made its way to other Caribbean and Latin American countries. It is usually made of orange juice, milk, cane sugar, and chopped ice. Sometimes vanilla extract is also added, or evaporated milk is used instead of regular milk. The recipe varies greatly depending on the region and the maker's family heritage. American observers have described the drink as resembling an orange Creamsicle, or the eponymous drink of Orange Julius.
