= House of Pies =

American restaurant chain

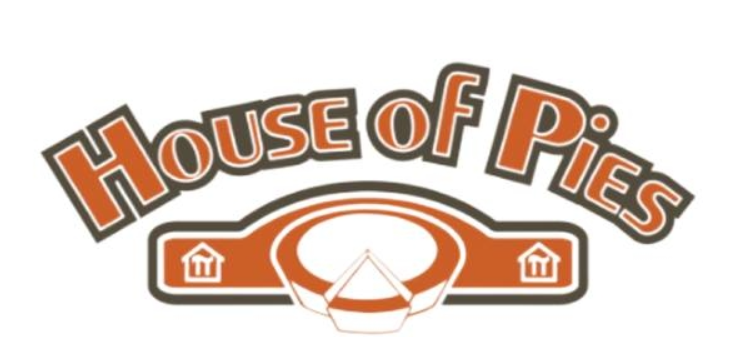

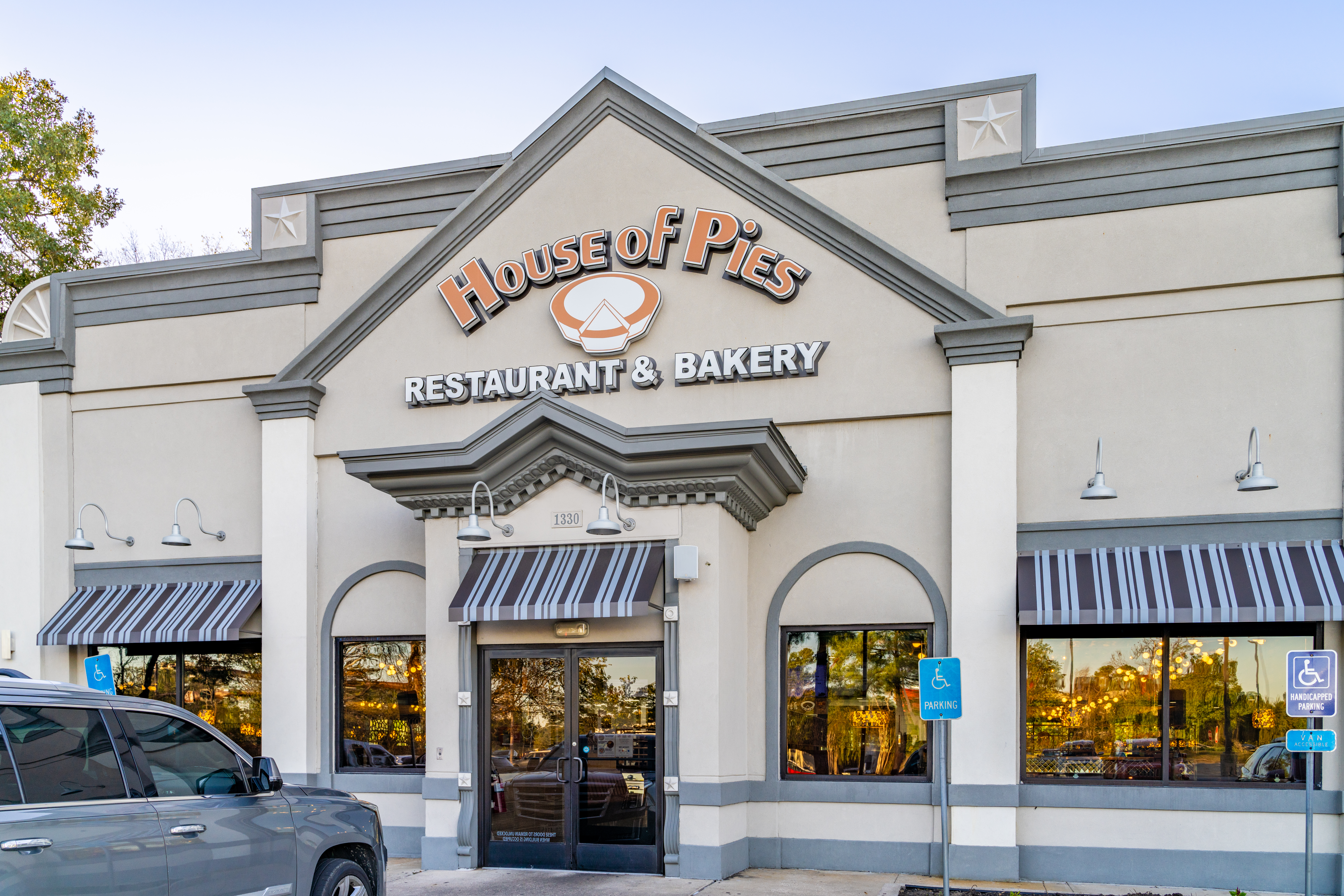
- Industry: Restaurant
- Founded: c. 1969
- Founder: Al Lapin Jr.
- Headquarters: United States
- Area served: Texas (6 stores)
- Services: Restaurant
- Website: https://houseofpies.com/

House of Pies is an American restaurant chain, started c. 1965 by Al Lapin Jr., an early franchise system designer and founder of International Industries Inc. who was also responsible for International House of Pancakes, Copper Penny Coffee Shops, Orange Julius, and others.

Specializing in many different flavors of pie available for dessert, the chain was popular up through 1976 when it was sold by IHOP Corporation (International Industries successor), to Robert Herndon, who eventually downsized the chain's locations. By c. 1986 the franchise chain filed for bankruptcy and closed most of its locations, but some individually owned and operated restaurants kept the House of Pies name and logo. Seven restaurants remain: one in Los Angeles, California, and six in the Greater Houston, Texas, area. Another location in Los Angeles was scheduled to open in 2022, but has been delayed.

== History ==
The first House of Pies was launched in 1965 in California. The restaurant then opened its next location in Houston at 3112 Kirby Dr., followed by the second Houston location at 6142 Westheimer Rd., both of which still exist today. House of Pies claims it first opened in Houston in 1967, but records from Houston Historic Retail and Houston Post archives show 1970 as the actual starting year (for both the Kirby and Westheimer locations).

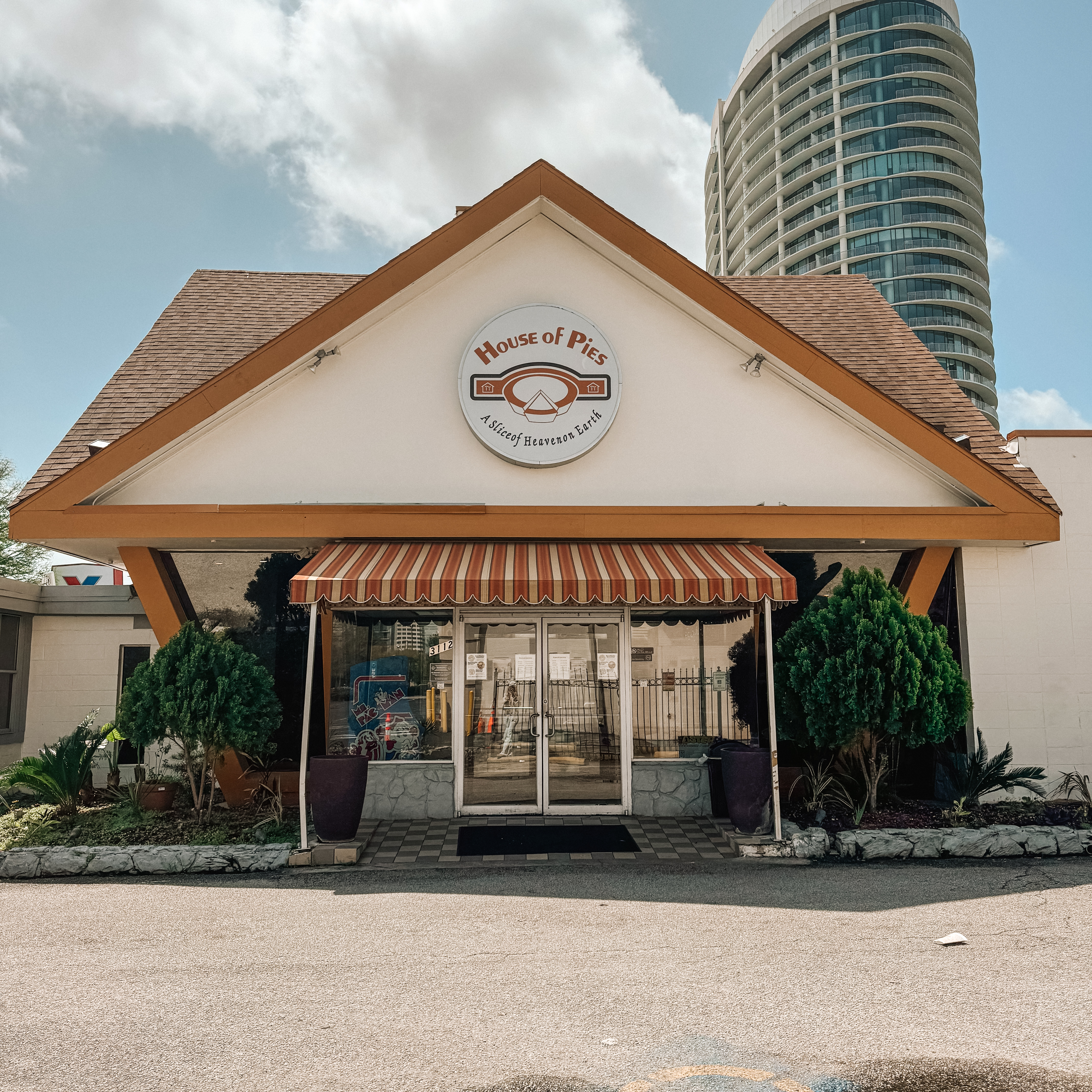
The House of Pies located at 3112 Kirby Drive, Houston, Texas

The chain, specializing in family dining, continued to expand and there were 32 locations in the greater Los Angeles area alone by 1971. The locations were known for their bright white building with pink trim and their circular sign which featured a house with the symbol for pi in it and the text "a unique coffee shop." The menu offered more than 60 varieties of pies.

In 1971, eight franchisees filed a class action lawsuit against International Industries. They claimed anti-trust violations involving price fixing and restricting their source of supplies which International denied. However, the parent company eventually reached a private settlement with the franchisees and lost $62 million in that year.

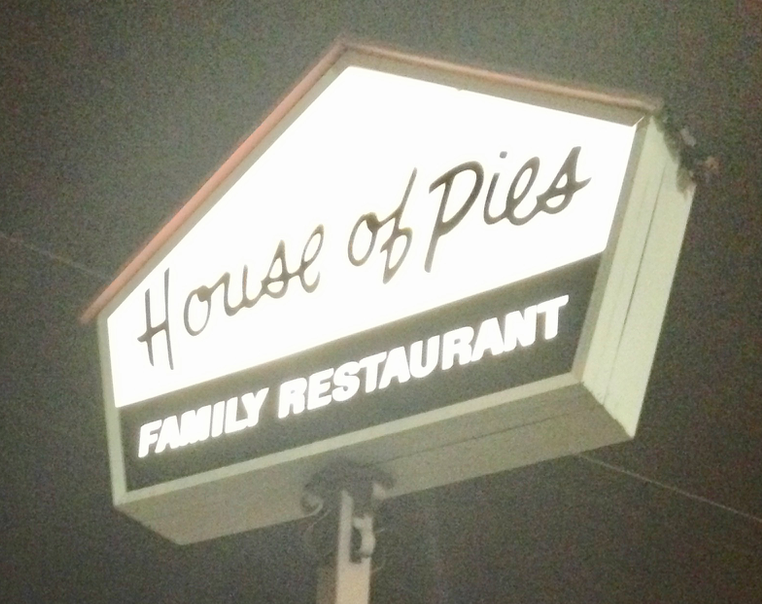
The Los Angeles House of Pies sign.

In August 1973, Lapin stepped down as CEO and president but remained as chairman of International Industries. Later that year, due to financial trouble, the company sold off House of Pies and other restaurants, including Copper Penny Family Coffee Shops and Wil Wright's Ice Cream Parlors. Franchisees were then left to operate independently or close, and several continued under the name House of Pies. By 1980, the Los Feliz location was the only one left operating under that name in Los Angeles. The Houston locations remained open and continued to grow.

In the late 1980s, the Khalaf family purchased the Houston locations from Dave Herndon and continues to operate the six locations in the Greater Houston area. They serve over 40 different pies and cakes at every restaurant, using the original recipes. They are known for the Bayou Goo pie, which has sweet cream cheese, crushed pecans, and a chocolate/vanilla custard topped with whipped cream, chocolate shavings, and powdered sugar. They also offer nationwide pie delivery.

== Cultural impact ==
A House of Pies appears in Ciao! Manhattan.

House of Pies is mentioned in the episode "Cowboys and Iranians" during Will & Grace's eighth season in 2006. While reading the resume of a prospective employee from Iran, Grace Adler comments that she had "no idea they had House of Pies in Tehran".

The founders of Compaq are reported to have made initial plans on a placemat at a House of Pies in Houston.

Natalie Portman shot scenes for the film No Strings Attached in the Los Angeles location 2010.
