= Miracle Treat Day (Dairy Queen) =

Fundraising Event

Miracle Treat Day is an American and Canadian fundraising event for the Children's Miracle Network and is sponsored by Dairy Queen. The event is held annually in the United States and in Canada. In the United States, at least $1 of all proceeds from each Blizzard sold at participating locations was donated to local Children's Miracle Network hospitals on August 2, 2018. In Canada, Miracle Treat Day was held on August 9, 2018, with the net proceeds of every Blizzard sold at participating Dairy Queen stores going to local Children's Miracle Network member hospitals.

== Purpose ==
The purpose of this event is to raise funds for the 170+ Children's Miracle Network hospital's worldwide. Each year these hospitals treat about 17 million children and they impact the lives of more children than any other children's organization in the world.

== History ==
Dairy Queen has been a supporter of Children’s Miracle Network since 1984. The first-ever Miracle Treat Day was on August 10, 2006 and has been held annually ever since although it went virtual in 2020-21. It is a tradition on the day of the event for the President and CEO of Dairy Queen, John Gainor, to personally deliver hundreds of Blizzard Treats to children and their families at local hospitals.

== Spokespersons ==
In 2006, Grammy-Winning Superstar LeAnn Rimes served as the honorary spokesperson for Dairy Queen's first-ever Miracle Treat Day. LeAnn has also performed many benefit concerts in support of the Children's Miracle Network.

In 2007, Miss America Lauren Nelson served as the honorary spokesperson for Dairy Queen’s Miracle Treat Day. "With my love for children, I am proud to be spokesperson for Miracle Treat Day, as I know this event will do so much to help children all over North America," said Nelson.

In 2008, Miss America Kirsten Haglund served as the honorary spokesperson for Dairy Queen's Miracle Treat Day. Miss America titleholders have been involved with Children's Miracle Network, visiting hospitals and helping with fundraising activities since 1989.

In 2009, Miss America Katie Stam served as the honorary spokesperson for Dairy Queen's Miracle Treat Day. She served Blizzard Treats at a local Dairy Queen for the event and she also promoted the day by conducting several TV and radio interviews.

== Success ==
Dairy Queen marked 30 years in support of the Children's Miracle Network in 2014. In that time, Dairy Queen has helped raise more than $125 million. The biggest fundraising event that Dairy Queen holds for the cause is the Miracle Treat Day. Each year the event makes millions of dollars, and the goal is for the amount to continue to grow.

A Dairy Queen franchise in Madison, South Dakota, owned by DeLon Mork, has sold the most Blizzards of any Dairy Queen in North America on Miracle Treat Day for the past 11 years.

- 2006: 3,083
- 2007: 7,011
- 2008: 12,347
- 2009: 18,017
- 2010: 21,405
- 2011: 25,648
- 2012: 31,351
- 2013: 38,412
- 2014: 47,638
- 2015: 45,516
- 2016: 40,059
- 2017: 40,686
- 2018: 44,657
- 2019: 44,061
- 2020: TBA
- 2021: 28,424
