= Orange Julius =

American chain of fruit drink beverage stores

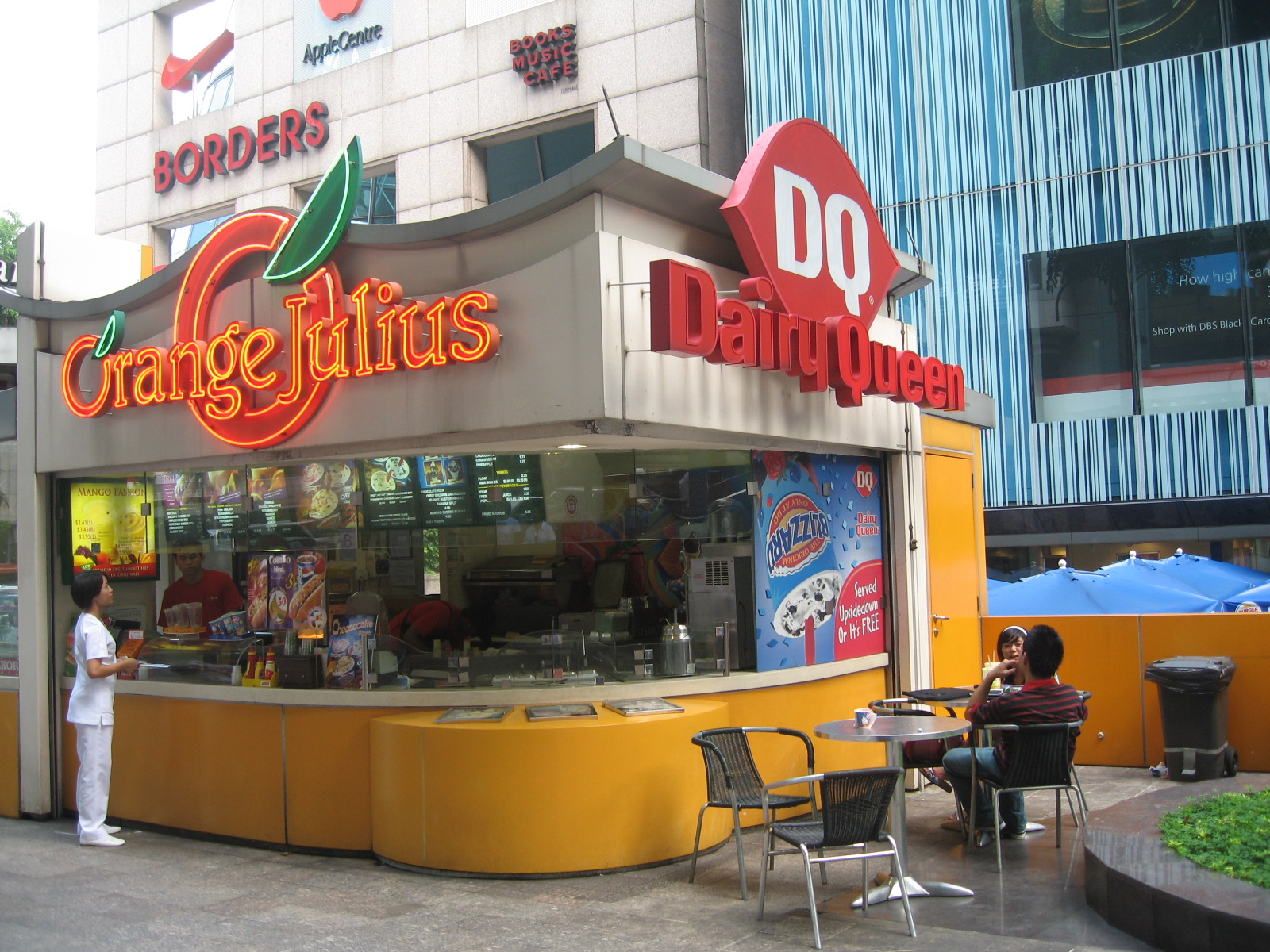
- An Orange Julius with a Dairy Queen, Liat Towers, 2006
- Type: Subsidiary
- Industry: Beverages
- Founded: 1926; 100 years ago Los Angeles, California, U.S.
- Founder: Julius Freed (1887–1952)
- Headquarters: Edina, Minnesota, U.S.
- Number of locations: 962 (2023)
- Area served: United States of America and Canada
- Products: Beverages
- Parent: Dairy Queen (1987-present)
- Website: www.orangejulius.com

Orange Julius is an American chain of beverage stores, known for a frothy, smoothie-like fruit drink also called an Orange Julius. The chain has been in business since the late 1920s. The signature beverage is a mixture of ice, orange juice, sweetener, milk, powdered egg whites and vanilla flavoring. Most stores are located inside shopping malls.

== History ==
"The first Orange Julius stand was established by Julius Freed and (Willard) Bill Hamlin in 1926 on South Broadway in Downtown Los Angeles."

In 1926, the drink was first served at an orange juice stand opened in Los Angeles, California, by Julius Freed. Sales were initially modest, about $20 a day, equivalent to approximately $360 in 2025 dollars. In 1929, Bill Hamlin, Freed's real estate broker, developed a mixture that made the acidic orange juice less bothersome to his stomach. Freed's stand began serving the drink, which had a frothier, creamier texture. The sales at the stand increased substantially after the introduction of the new drink, going up to $100, or $1,820 in 2025 dollars a day.

In the 1950s and 1960s, Orange Julius was sold at state and county fairs and freestanding Orange Julius stands. It was the Official Drink of the 1964 New York World’s Fair Exposition.

In 1967, Hamlin sold Orange Julius to Al Lapin Junior's International Industries corporation, which also owned International House of Pancakes; The Original House of Pies, and others. The Santa Monica, California, headquartered company reached about 745 franchises, from California to Canada. It also changed its name to Orange Julius International. In 1985, it was acquired by Custom Creamery Systems, a New York-based ice cream and vending machine operator. A condition of the deal was that the merged company retain the Orange Julius International name. It was publicly traded, for a time, over-the-counter.

At its peak, as an independent company, it had hundreds of stores in malls across the United States, including Puerto Rico, and Canada. The first store opened in Asia in Hong Kong, in 1977, then spread to Singapore, South Korea, the Philippines and Japan.

In 1987, the Orange Julius chain was bought by International Dairy Queen, which was purchased by billionaire Warren Buffett in 1998, making it a wholly owned subsidiary of Berkshire Hathaway. Most of the surviving independent Orange Julius stores were rebranded into Dairy Queens.

As of 2026, a handful of standalone Orange Julius stores remain in operation, such as one at the Crossgates Mall in Albany, NY. Dairy Queen added Orange Julius to its product line at its stores. Today, Orange Julius is a menu item available at Dairy Queen stores, called Treat Centers.

== Naming and mascot ==
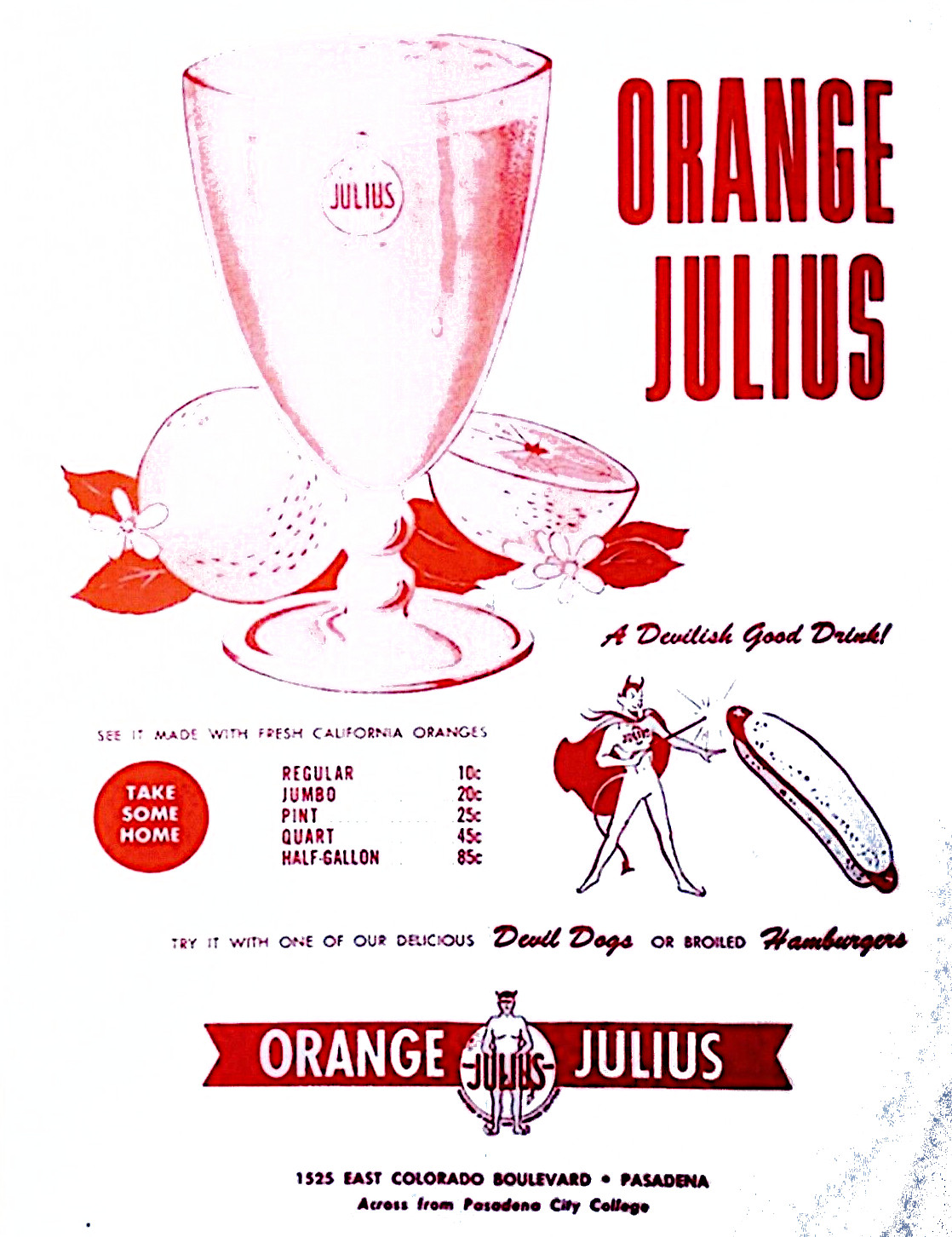

The Orange Julius was the official drink of the 1964 New York World's Fair.

Orange Julius first started using a devil mascot for their logo in 1926. In the 1970s and early 1980s, Orange Julius beverage stands used an image of a devil with a pitchfork around an orange, with the slogan, "A Devilish Good Drink". The devil image resembled Sparky, the mascot of Arizona State University. The company later dropped the logo and slogan after threats of a lawsuit from the ASU alumni association.

For a short period in the early 1970s, Orange Julius expanded into the UK and Dutch markets, with a fairly large restaurant in Golders Green, selling Julius Burgers as well as the classic orange drink, and a small outlet in the city center of Amsterdam. There were plans to increase the number to 20–25 outlets in the Netherlands, and at least one was realized, in the city of Utrecht. The brand was introduced and largely financed in the Netherlands by Eurobee NV, a subsidiary of Koninklijke Bijenkorf Beheer (KBB), one of the major retailers in The Netherlands at that time. Orange Julius left the Dutch market in the mid-1970s.

== See also ==
- Gibeau Orange Julep
- Juice bar
- Morir soñando

== Sources ==
- Mariani, John F. (1999). The Encyclopedia of American Food and Drink. New York: Lebhar-Friedman. ISBN 0-86730-784-6. OCLC 968195941.
