= Fuzzy's Taco Shop =

US fast food chain

Fuzzy’s Taco Opportunities, LLC
- Trade name: Fuzzy's Taco Shop
- Company type: Subsidiary
- Industry: Restaurant Franchising
- Genre: Fast casual
- Founded: 2001; 25 years ago
- Headquarters: Irving, Texas, United States
- Number of locations: 150+
- Products: Baja-Style Mexican food
- Parent: Dine Brands (2022-present)
- Website: fuzzystacoshop.com

Fuzzy's Taco Shop is an American fast casual restaurant chain specializing in Baja-style Mexican cuisine. Serving breakfast, lunch and dinner, Fuzzy's operates more than 150 locations in 17 states.

== History ==
In 2001, Paul Willis with the help of Chef Steve Mitchell opened the first Fuzzy's Taco Shop on West Berry Street in Fort Worth, Texas, near the campus of Texas Christian University. It was purchased in 2003 by Chuck and Alan Bush, who opened the brand's second restaurant in East Fort Worth in 2007 before launching a rapid expansion of the chain through franchising that focused primarily on locations near college campuses before branching out into other areas.

The brand opened its 50th location in 2012 and its 100th location in 2016 - just months after selling a 70% stake to Atlanta-based private equity group NRD Capital Management, which also owned Frisch's Big Boy.

Previous logo

Fuzzy's reached 150 locations in early 2019, and now operates restaurants in Texas, Oklahoma, Louisiana, Arkansas, Arizona, Colorado, Florida, Georgia, Iowa, Kansas, Minnesota, Mississippi, Missouri, Montana, Nebraska, South Carolina, Ohio and Virginia. The company has announced plans to surpass 200 locations by 2021. In January 2022, Fuzzy's announced an agreement to expand into Alabama and North Carolina. In December 2022, the chain was acquired by Dine Brands.
