= Applebee's =

American casual dining chain

Applebee's Restaurants LLC.
- Logo since 2017

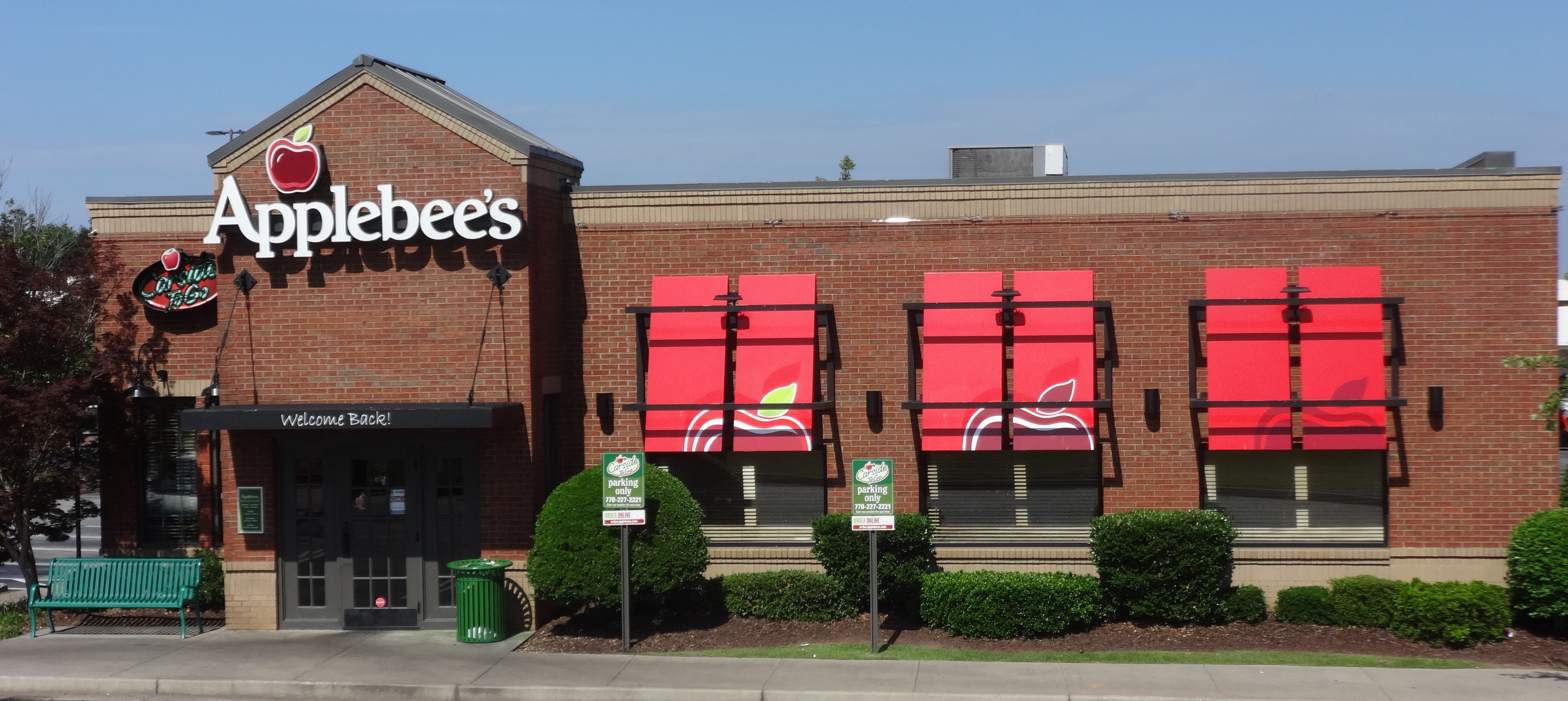
- An Applebee's in Griffin, Georgia
- Trade name: Applebee's Neighborhood Grill + Bar
- Type: Subsidiary
- Industry: Restaurants Franchising
- Genre: Casual dining
- Founded: November 19, 1980; 45 years ago Atlanta, Georgia, U.S.
- Founders: Bill Palmer; T. J. Palmer
- Headquarters: Glendale, California, U.S.
- Number of locations: 1,787 (as of December 31, 2019)
- Areas served: United States, Canada, Mexico, Guatemala, Panama, Brazil, Qatar, Saudi Arabia, Kuwait, United Arab Emirates, India, Peru
- Key people: John Peyton (president); Stephen Bulgarelli (Chief Culinary Officer)
- Products: American cuisine: (burgers; chicken; pasta; ribs; salads; seafood; soup; steak; appetizers; sandwiches; wraps; kids menu)
- Number of employees: 28,000 (2013)
- Parent: Dine Brands (2007–present)
- Website: applebees.com

Applebee's Restaurants LLC. is an American company that develops, franchises, and operates the Applebee's Neighborhood Grill + Bar restaurant chain. Applebee's focuses on casual dining, with mainstream American dishes such as salads, chicken, burgers, and "riblets" (Applebee's signature dish).

== History ==
=== 1980–2006: Founding and going public ===
The Applebee's chain was founded by Bill and T. J. Palmer in July 1980. Their vision was "to create a restaurant that had a neighborhood pub feel to it and could offer friendly service along with quality fare at a lower price than most of their competition." The name “Appleby” was their first choice for this concept, but they found that it had already been registered. They also considered "Cinnamon's" and "Pepper's" before arriving at Applebee's. They opened their first location on November 19, 1980, in Decatur, Georgia, at the time named T.J. Applebee's Rx for Edibles & Elixirs. They opened a second location outside of Atlanta, Georgia, a few years later, and sold the company to W. R. Grace and Company in May 1983. As part of the transaction, Bill Palmer was named president of the Applebee's Division, an indirect subsidiary of W. R. Grace and Company. In that capacity, Palmer guided the operation from its entrepreneurial beginnings to a full-fledged franchise system. He became an Applebee's franchisee in 1985. Bill Palmer died in 2020.

In 1986, the name of the concept was changed to Applebee's Neighborhood Grill & Bar. In 1988, Applebee's International, Inc., became the restaurant chain's franchiser when Kansas City franchisees Abe Gustin and John Hamra purchased the rights to the Applebee's concept from W. R. Grace. In 1989, Applebee's opened their 100th restaurant in Nashville, Tennessee.

In the 1990s, Applebee's became one of the largest sit-down restaurant chains in the United States, and it began trading publicly in November 1991. In 1998, Applebee's opened its 1000th restaurant.

=== 2007–present: Acquisition by IHOP ===
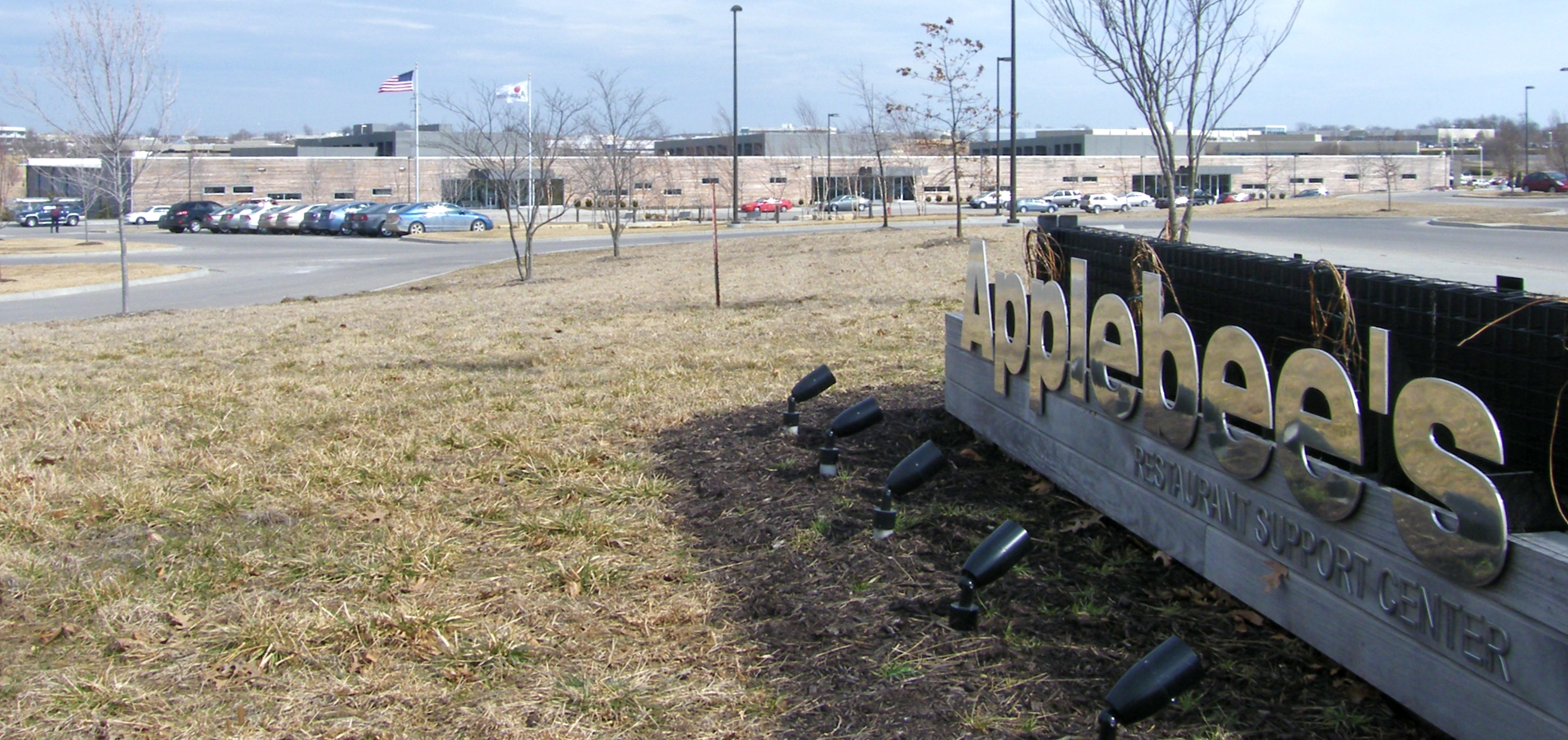
Former headquarters in Lenexa, Kansas (now called Restaurant Support Center)

On July 16, 2007, IHOP Corp. announced that it agreed to buy Applebee's International for about $2.1 billion. Applebee's shareholders would receive $25.50 in cash per share, representing a 4.6% premium to the closing price on July 13, 2007.

The acquisition was completed on November 29, 2007, after which IHOP Corp. was renamed Dine Equity. The combined company became the largest full-service restaurant company in the world, with more than 3,250 locations. A major goal for the new ownership was to revitalize the chain, as well as shift towards a franchise model for the majority of its locations.

In 2013, the chain faced an uproar on the Internet after firing a waitress who posted a picture of a customer's receipt that had a rude note written on it objecting to a required gratuity, and then poorly handling their response to the incident.

On August 11, 2017, DineEquity announced that Applebee's would close between 105 and 135 locations by the end of the year. Same-store sales decreased 7% in the previous quarter.

In-late 2017, Applebee's began to place an increased focus on promotions involving low-cost cocktails, including a $1 margarita promotion dubbed the "Dollarita" in October, and $1 Long Island iced tea (promoted as "L.I.T.s") in December. The drinks would serve as a loss leader, with customers subsequently upsold towards higher-priced food products. Despite hesitation by some franchisees to participate, the promotions were associated with a major increase in traffic at some locations, and prompted the chain to offer similar promotions later on. Dine Brands' new CEO Steve Joyce credited the promotions with having helped influence a major financial turnaround at the company, noting that almost all customers who ordered one also ordered food, and that some customers also moved towards the other cocktails on its menu.

As of December 31, 2019, there were 1,787 restaurants operating system-wide in the United States and 15 other countries, including 69 that are company owned and 1,718 that are franchised. United States locations have steadily declined in recent years and as of March 2025, there were just over 1,600 locations.

In March 2024, Dine Brands announced it was exploring Applebee's-IHOP dual-branded restaurants that might launch within 12-24 months, after the successful introduction of prototypes in international markets. CEO John Peyton said the restaurants were the same size as standalone restaurants of each brand but generated twice the revenue.

== Advertising ==
As part of the company's marketing campaign and slogan, Wanda Sykes was hired in 2007 to voice the chain's new mascot, the Applebee's Apple. The character appears in commercials touting Applebee's various specials and stating the new slogan "Together is good" or saying "Get it together, baby!" as the slogan appears at the bottom right of the screen. A new campaign started on February 25, 2008, without Sykes' character (the spokesapple), with the slogan "It's a whole new neighborhood." The commercials used both the original and new logos. In 2009 Applebee's changed its slogan again to "There's no place like the neighborhood."

From 2012 to 2016, Applebee's aired an advertising campaign focusing on fresh ingredients and new dishes, narrated by Jason Sudeikis, featuring the slogan "See you tomorrow."

In 2012, Applebee's partnered with the country group Zac Brown Band on a Veteran's Day-themed "Thank You Movement" campaign to honor members of the U.S. military. The band's song "Chicken Fried" has also been featured in a Applebee's commercial; in February 2022, Applebee's pulled its advertising from CNN after an incident where an inappropriately timed split-screen commercial break featured live footage of the 2022 Russian Invasion of Ukraine shown alongside the ad.

In late September 2017, Applebee's brought back its most famous slogan from the early-to-mid 2000s, "Eatin' Good in the Neighborhood." In 2022, Applebee's advertising fees accounted for 177.4 million U.S. dollars.

In August 2021, after having their Oreo Cookie removed because of the COVID-19 pandemic impact, Applebee's restored it back to their menu. The chain and beverage was also mentioned in Walker Hayes' top hit song "Fancy Like", which was subsequently featured in their Applebee's commercial as well.

For the 2024 NFL season, Detroit Lions Head Coach Dan Campbell appeared in Applebee's commercials.

In January 2024, the company introduced Applebee's Date Night Pass. The $300 card would provide holders 52 date nights, from February 1, 2024 to January 21, 2025, the opportunity to spend $30 on food and non-alcoholic beverages either in restaurants or using takeout. It came during an inflationary environment for restaurants and was designed to make going out more accessible. CNN reported this move came amid others that indicated the chain was emphasizing its role as an affordable place to eat, like bringing back all-you-can-eat boneless wings or heavily discounted margaritas. At the time of the announcement, it could also be used for online orders but not for those through third-party services.

== Side-work compensation ==
Since 2006, Applebee's and its servers have been engaged in a lawsuit over hourly wages. The servers, who received a federal minimum wage of $2.13 per hour as tipped employees, stated that the company requires them to spend 20% of their time doing non-serving labor, for which they should be paid the federal non-tipped minimum wage of $7.25 per hour. The case has gone through several stages, including a judicially mandated binding arbitration session. In September 2012, a judge in Illinois ruled in favor of the Applebee's employees and will evaluate damages at a later date.
