= Dine Brands =

American restaurant company

Dine Brands Global, Inc.
- Formerly: International Industries (1960–1976); IHOP Corporation (1976–2008); DineEquity Inc. (2008–2018)
- Type: Public
- Traded as: NYSE: DIN
- Industry: Restaurants
- Genre: Casual dining
- Founded: 1958; 68 years ago
- Headquarters: Pasadena, California, U.S.
- Number of locations: 3,588 (2023)
- Area served: Worldwide
- Key people: John Peyton (CEO); Lawrence Kim (president IHOP); Tony Moralejo (president Applebee's); Patrick Kirk (president Fuzzy's Taco Shop)
- Revenue: ▲US$879 million (2025)
- Net income: ▼US$17.1 million (2025)
- Number of employees: 596 (2023)
- Subsidiaries: IHOP; Applebee's; Fuzzy's Taco Shop
- Website: www.dinebrands.com

Dine Brands Global, Inc. is a publicly traded food and beverage company based in Pasadena, California. Founded in 1958 as IHOP, it operates franchised and corporate owned restaurants, including three restaurant concepts, Applebee's Neighborhood Grill & Bar, International House of Pancakes (IHOP), and Fuzzy's Taco Shop.

== History ==
In the late 1950s, Al Lapin Jr. formed a holding company for the International House of Pancakes chain called International Industries. Eventually, the holding company consisted of International House of Pancakes, Orange Julius, Love's Wood Pit Barbecue, Golden Cup Coffee Shops, The Original House of Pies, Wil Wright's Ice Cream Shoppes, and Copper Penny Coffee Shops.

In 1976, International Industries was renamed to IHOP, Inc; and IHOP Corporation was founded as a new holding firm for IHOP, Love's, and OHOP, which was later sold shortly after. In 1979, it was purchased by Wienerwald Holding, the owners of Wienerwald and Lum's chains. Wienerwald later declared Chapter 11 bankruptcy in 1982, and sold IHOP Corp to SVIDO in 1983; who hadn't been involved in the restaurant business prior.

In 1987, IHOP was purchased by an investment group led by Richard K. Herzer; returning IHOP's ownership by an American company. Four years later, the company went public for the first time since 1979.

In 2007, IHOP Corp announced it would be acquiring Applebee's International for approximately $2.1 billion. Following the closing, IHOP Corporation was renamed to DineEquity Inc.; and subsequently announced it would franchise most of Applebee's 500 company-owned locations.

In 2018, it was renamed to Dine Brands Global.

As of December 31, 2019, Dine Brands had 3,628 restaurants including 1,787 Applebee's and 1,841 IHOP restaurants, including 69 Applebee's that are company owned, 161 IHOP restaurants that are owned by area licensees and 3,398 franchised restaurants including 1,718 Applebee's and 1,680 IHOP restaurants.

In December 2022, they acquired Fuzzy's Taco Shop for $80 million in cash.
