= Texas Country Reporter =

Weekly television program in the US

- Written by: Abigail Adams; Quintin Blackwell; Devin Fortenberry; Martin Perry; Scott Ray; Melissa Reese; J.B. Sauceda; Mike Snyder; Dan Stricklin
- Presented by: John McLean; Joe Miser; Bob Phillips; Kelli Phillips; Jeff Rosser; J.B. Sauceda
- Country of origin: United States
- Original language: English
- No. of seasons: 53

Production
- Executive producer: J.B. Sauceda
- Producer: Mike Snyder
- Cinematography: Riley Engemon; Martin Perry; Dan Stricklin
- Editors: Abigail Adams; Quintin Blackwell; Devin Fortenberry; Martin Perry; Scott Ray; Melissa Reese; J.B. Sauceda; Mike Snyder; Dan Stricklin
- Running time: 20-22 minutes
- Production company: Phillips Productions (Texas Monthly LLC)

Original release
- Release: 1972 – present

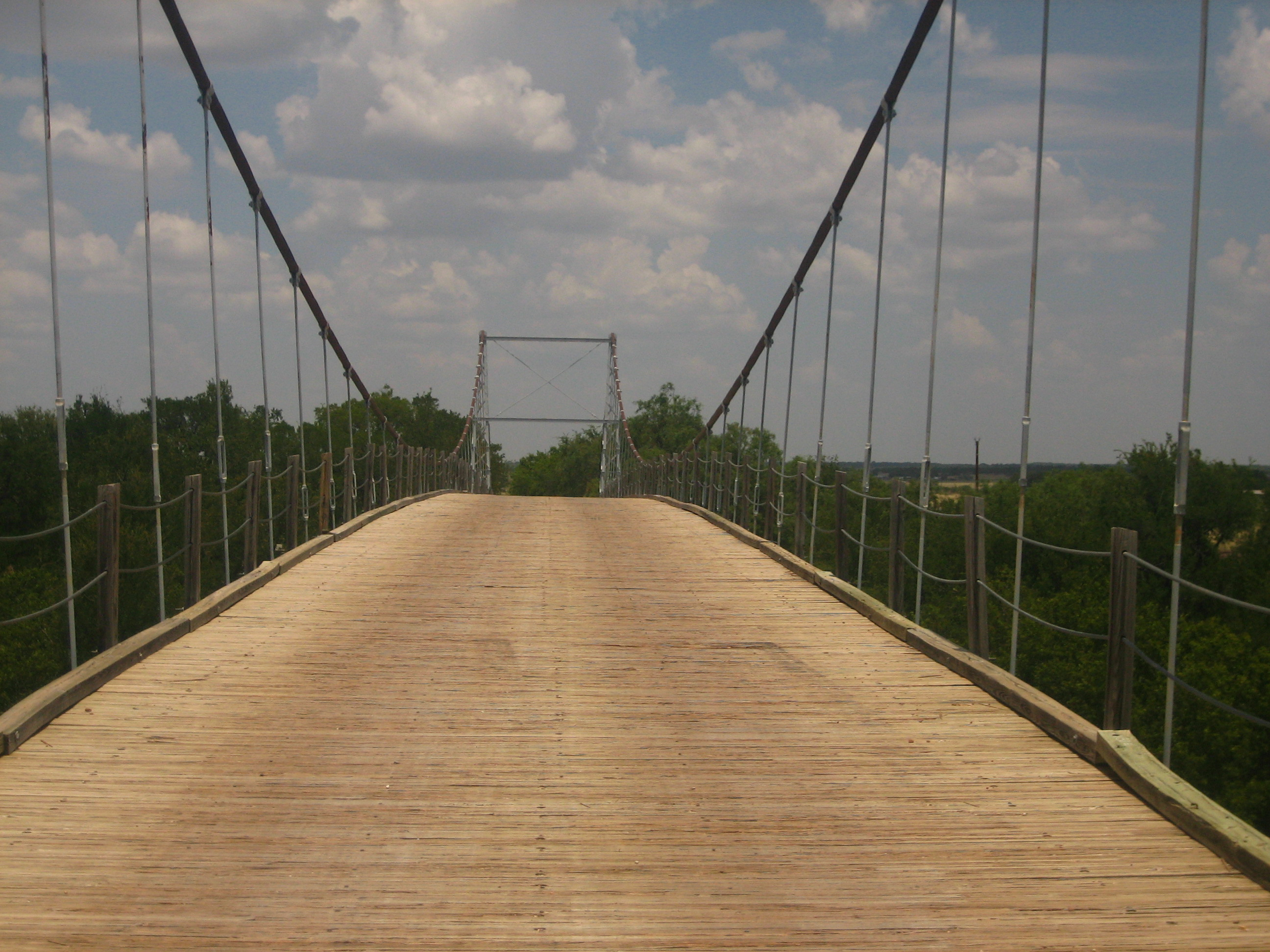
The Regency Suspension Bridge near Goldthwaite which Bob Phillips crosses in the introduction to his Texas Country Reporter television series

Texas Country Reporter is a weekly syndicated television program hosted by J.B. Sauceda, which airs in all twenty-two Texas media markets, generally on weekends, and nationally on the satellite/cable channel RFD-TV. It is the longest running independently produced program in the nation, and has received over 30 Emmy awards.

== History ==
Texas Country Reporter, originally called 4 Country Reporter, debuted in 1972 on Dallas television station KDFW (Channel 4, thus the name). It was first hosted by John McLean, then Jeff Rosser, Joe Miser and finally Bob Phillips. Phillips was a photographer and producer when the show first began.

In 1986, Phillips left KDFW and began selling the show in syndication under the name Texas Country Reporter. In the Dallas market, KDFW did not pick up the syndicated version, but rival station WFAA did and named the show 8 Country Reporter.

As of November 2017, Bob Phillips had taped more than two thousand episodes of the program.

In the 2021-2022 season, the show celebrated its 50th anniversary on the air.

In 2021, Texas Country Reporter production company Phillips Productions was acquired by Texas Monthly.

Bob and Kelli Phillips stepped down from the program in September 2024. The series continued with new host J. B. Sauceda.

== Format ==
Texas Country Reporter airs 26 new episodes each season, from September through May. Each episode showcases Texas people and places, with an emphasis on rural areas and in a style similar to that of Charles Kuralt's On the Road for CBS News, who was Phillips' mentor when he first began his career.

Texas Country Reporter posts selected segments to its YouTube page, and some have been featured on local newscasts.

Since 1996, the program has headlined an annual Texas Country Reporter Festival, with some of the people who have been highlighted on the show in attendance. The festival was initially hosted in Waxahachie from its inception until 2023. After a 1-year hiatus in 2024, show owner Texas Monthly announced it had entered into a partnership with the city of Grand Prairie to host the festival beginning in spring 2025.

Phillips has authored several books and video series over the years including two cook books, two Texas guide books and, in 2016, "The Texas Country Reporter Collection," a video series that includes more than 22 hours of stories from the program. A three-DVD highlights set, Go! Stay! Eat!, was released September 17, 2005. Two comprehensive video series have been released by Phillips' company, including "Best of Volume 1" and "Best of Volume 2".

== Notable TCR segments ==
=== Individuals ===
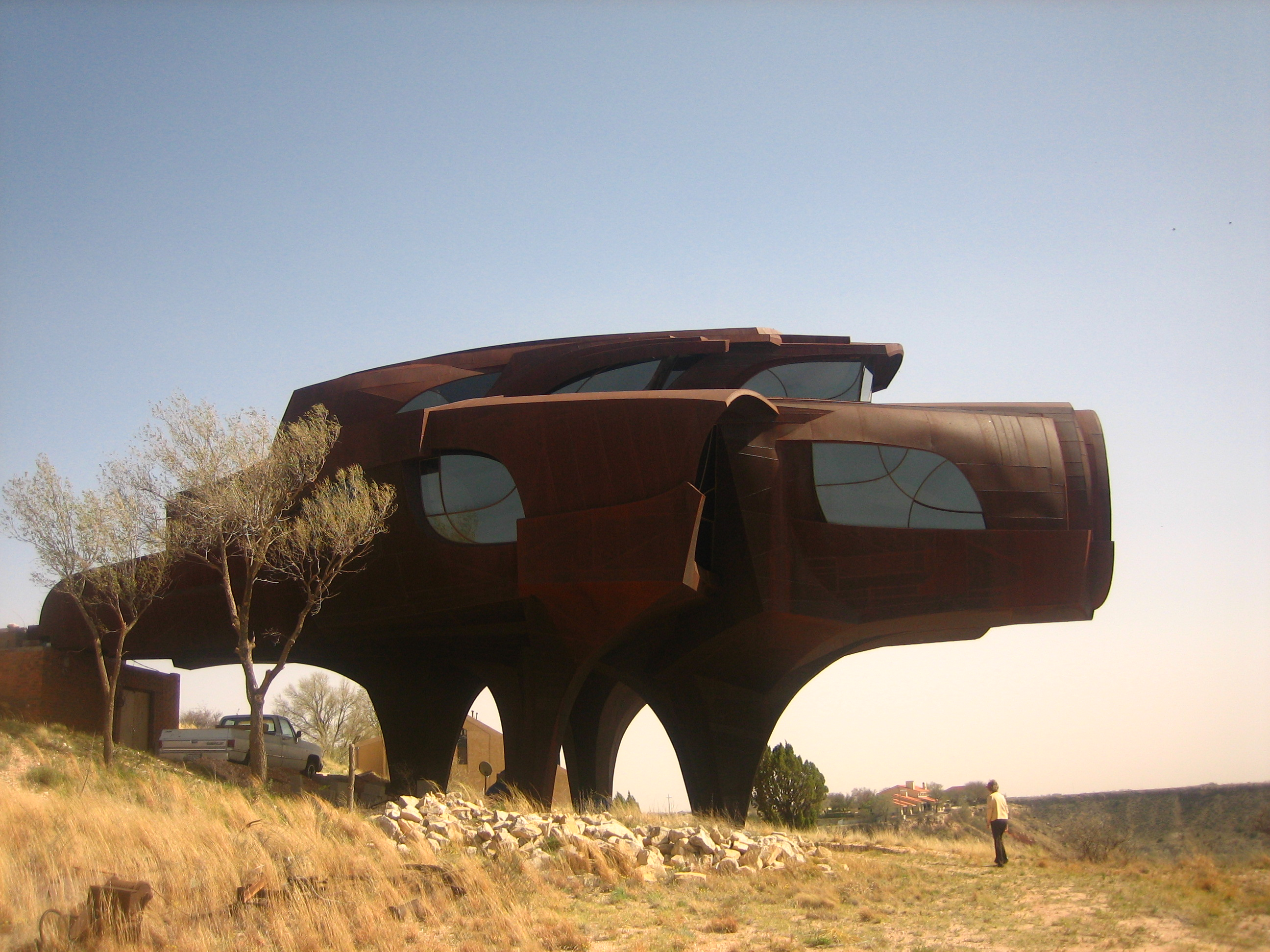
Robert Bruno steel house in Ransom Canyon, Texas

- Matt Brown, a football and track and field coach at Idalou High School, who is a gold and bronze winner in the Parapan American Games. He lost his left leg, amputated above the knee, as a result of an industrial accident in 2005.
- John Chadwell, a collector in Wichita Falls, is preserving artifacts from the former Wichita Falls Transportation Company, an independent truck production firm owned by Joseph A. Kemp, which was in business from 1911 to 1932.
- Terry Gouley, ice sculptor in Midland, used a chain saw and chisels for his temporary creations popular for special occasions.
- Maurice Jackson, in his 45th year of business in 2012 in O'Donnell, operates one of the last remaining full-service gasoline stations in the state of Texas.
- David Smith, sculptor of weather vanes with mythological images, based in Sugar Land, Texas

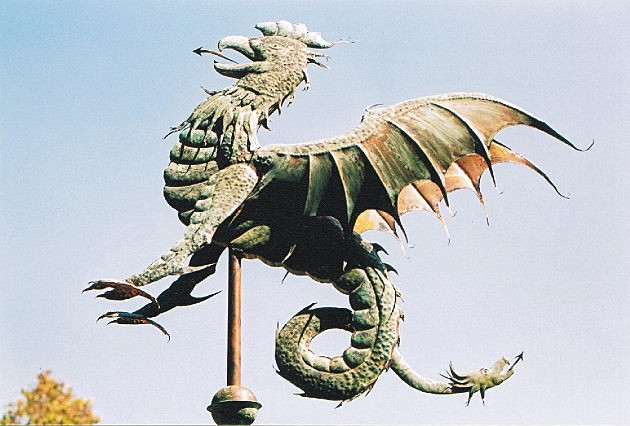
A basilisk weathervane that appeared in the episode "David Smith, Working in Vane."

- Ryan Smith, law-school dropout at the age of twenty-five returned the drive-in theater to Lubbock; in 1948, his maternal grandfather, R. A. "Skeet" Noret, had opened a drive-in in Lubbock, also at the age of twenty-five. Noret also owned the Sky-Vue Drive-In in Lamesa, which closed in 2015 after a fire destroyed the concession stand.
- Bill Walter Worrell (born c. 1935), western artist and sculptor with studios in Santa Fe, New Mexico, and along the Llano River in Art, near Mason, Texas. Worrell has erected a unique personal "cemetery" which he calls the "Garden of Thorns", where he "buries" with engraved white wooden crosses his "thorns in the flesh" as he encounters them, such as Fear, Blame, and Shame.

=== Others ===
- Big Country Athletic Hall of Fame, operated by veteran sports announcer Al Pickett in Abilene honors local and regional excellence at the high school and collegiate levels in football, baseball, basketball, and golf; featured on TCR the weekend of August 3, 2013.
- Bracken Cave near Natural Bridge Caverns north of San Antonio, home to one of two large bat colonies in Texas. Bats control the insect population, help to pollinate plants, and are a food source for other animals.
- Bush Family Home State Historic Site on West Ohio Street in Midland, the only house in the United States where two U.S. Presidents, a First Lady, and a governor of Florida once resided.
- Central Texas Tool Company, a fourth-generation non-computerized operation of the Carpenter family at 1410 Walnut Street in Abilene, specializes in pipe threading and the repair of oilfield equipment.
- Ezell Aviation, operated by father and son Nelson and Chad Ezell in Breckenridge, restores abandoned old aircraft to flying status once again.
- Collin Street Bakery in Corsicana, known for its holiday treats, particularly fruitcake, aired December 22, 2007
- Copano Bay Fishing Pier, north of Rockport, is a 24-hour fishing bank on the former Copano Causeway, which was constructed in 1930. The 11-mile long Copano bridge was replaced in 1966 by a modern structure and dedicated to then U.S. President Lyndon B. Johnson. Well lit, the pier is popular twenty-four hours a day.
- Doc McGregor Collection, located within the Corpus Christi Museum of Science and History, is a massive restoration project of some 300,000 community photographs of all kinds taken in Corpus Christi from the 1930s through the 1950s. Photographer Ron Randolf has since 1987 been sorting the photographs into an orderly collection.
- 8 Track Museum, operated by Bucks Burnett at 2630 E Commerce Street in Dallas, has a collection of some three hundred 8-track tapes.
- Frontier Texas!, state-of-the-art western museum in Abilene, with focus on eight weather vanes in the shape of bison installed in 2013 in the courtyard.
- Gil's Broiler & Manske Bakery in San Marcos, known for its charbroil hamburgers and the Manske roll, a large cinnamon treat formerly sold nationally but returned to local-only production.
- Hotel El Capitan in downtown Van Horn, historic hotel underwent $2.5 million in renovations in 2013; episode depicts Van Horn as the center of a wheel from which spokes emanate to outlying historic sites and attractions in a remote desert area.
- Hueco Tanks State Historic Site, TCR shows the isolation of the Hueco Mountains northeast of El Paso. The cracks in rocks and boulders trap rainwater to overcome drought conditions. The site is popular for a kind of rock climbing known as bouldering.
- Mi Tierra Café and Bakery in downtown San Antonio, founded in 1941, never closes. It was voted by TCR viewers in 2013 as having the best Mexican food in the state.
- Odessa Meteor Crater Museum and its curator, Tom Rodman
- Padre Island National Seashore, biologist Donna Shaver on preserving the sea turtle, aired August 25, 2007
- Satin Strings, under its director, Todd Berridge, is known for the stirring emotional presentations it delivers at Permian High School in Odessa. The group has performed at presidential inaugurations and other national events.
- Texas Basketball Museum, located in tiny Carmine in Fayette County in southeastern Texas, is operated by coach Bob Springer, whose collection focuses on Texas players elevated into the professional ranks as well as high school teams with particular achievement.
- Texas Church Project, five photographers, Jeremy Moore, David Brown, Lee Carmichael, Mike Castles, and Matt Magruder, wander about Texas photographing historic churches.

== Related links ==
- Official site, includes information on the people featured, events calendar and guide to Texas dialect.
- RFD-TV, features a brief history of the show in Phillips' own words.
- Texas Country Reporter's Channel on YouTube, featuring dozens of videos from the show.
- Texas Country Reporter on Facebook
