= Bob Phillips =

American journalist

- Born: June 23, 1951 (age 75); Dallas, Texas, U.S.
- Education: Bryan Adams High School; Southern Methodist University
- Occupation: Television journalist
- Years active: 1972–present
- Spouse(s): Kelli Adkins Phillips (second wife, married 2007)

Robert Leon Phillips (born June 23, 1951) is an American television journalist best known for his long-running program Texas Country Reporter. In 2005, Phillips was inducted into the Silver Circle of the Lone Star Chapter of the National Academy of Television Arts and Sciences, the association that gives the Emmy Awards; the honor is extended to professionals who have spent at least 25 years of their career in television in Texas and have made significant contributions to their industry and their communities.

== Early life and education ==
Phillips was born in Dallas, Texas, where he graduated in 1969 from Bryan Adams High School. He grew up in the hotel industry with a mother whose speciality was helping hotels to establish their housekeeping staff; in a 2006 interview, Phillips stated that his first paying job was assisting the executive chef at the Dallas Hilton Hotel, adding, "I found out real fast that washing dishes was not what I wanted to do." He attended Southern Methodist University, graduating with a Bachelor of Fine Arts degree in 1973 and a Master of Liberal Arts degree in 1977.

== Career ==
Phillips has been an adjunct professor at Amberton University since 1987 and teaches communications courses.

An admirer of CBS broadcast journalist Charles Kuralt, Phillips chose the same field. He began working at local CBS affiliate KDFW-TV as a dispatcher his first year in college, started learning to use a TV camera, and within three months was reassigned as a photographer. He got his break in March 1970 when he was sent to shoot a film about a possible drowning, and no reporter was available to interview the youths involved, who had survived; after preparing the equipment, Phillips stepped in front of the camera to report the story while the camera ran itself, a procedure commonly known in broadcasting as "a one man band" that became his regular mode of operations. Phillips also travelled extensively with The Dallas Cowboys NFL team during the 1970s, shooting on the sidelines at the team's games.

Initially focusing on political and sports coverage, the novice reporter pursued his goal of filming feature stories for inclusion on local broadcasts. Instead, the management decided to package his features in a separate half-hour weekend program, and 4 Country Reporter debuted in 1972. In 1986, he left Channel 4, renamed the show Texas Country Reporter, and began producing and syndicating it through his own company, Phillips Productions; the show aired in all 22 broadcast markets in Texas, including rival station WFAA, which renamed the show 8 Country Reporter, and eventually was added to stations in neighboring Louisiana.

During this time, Dairy Queen was one of the show's sponsors, which allowed Phillips to be the chain's spokesperson in its ads when promoting food items at its Texas-based restaurants. When RFD-TV launched in December 2000, Texas Country Reporter was one of its featured programs. RFD introduced the program to audiences around the nation. Phillips has been closely involved in the development of the channel since he was approached about adding his show to its lineup. Today, Phillips' show is available in more than 60-million homes nationwide via RFD-TV and Phillips' Texas broadcast network.

As an extension of his many years in broadcast journalism, Phillips has authored several books — mostly on Texas travel and cuisine. He has been a professor of communications at Amberton University for more than 25 years. In 2007, Phillips married KFDM-TV anchor Kelli Lee (now Phillips), who joined him as co-host of Texas Country Reporter in September 2015. They currently reside in Dallas. Since December 2024, the couple have hosted the podcast Own the Road with Kelli & Bob.
