= Pharmaceutical ink =

Ingestible ink used on medicine

Pharmaceutical ink is an ingestible form of water-based ink used on most medicine pills to indicate which drug it is, and/or how many milligrams the pill contains.

== History ==
The first U.S. patent for pharmaceutical inks was filed on 28 June 1966, and its method involved ethyl alcohol, shellac, titanium dioxide and propylene glycol.

Most pharmaceutical inks since the early 1990s eliminate ethyl alcohol in favour of faster ink drying times, and may include methyl alcohol and isopropanol in addition to the traditional ingredients titanium dioxide and propylene glycol.

== See also ==
- Pharmaceutical glaze
