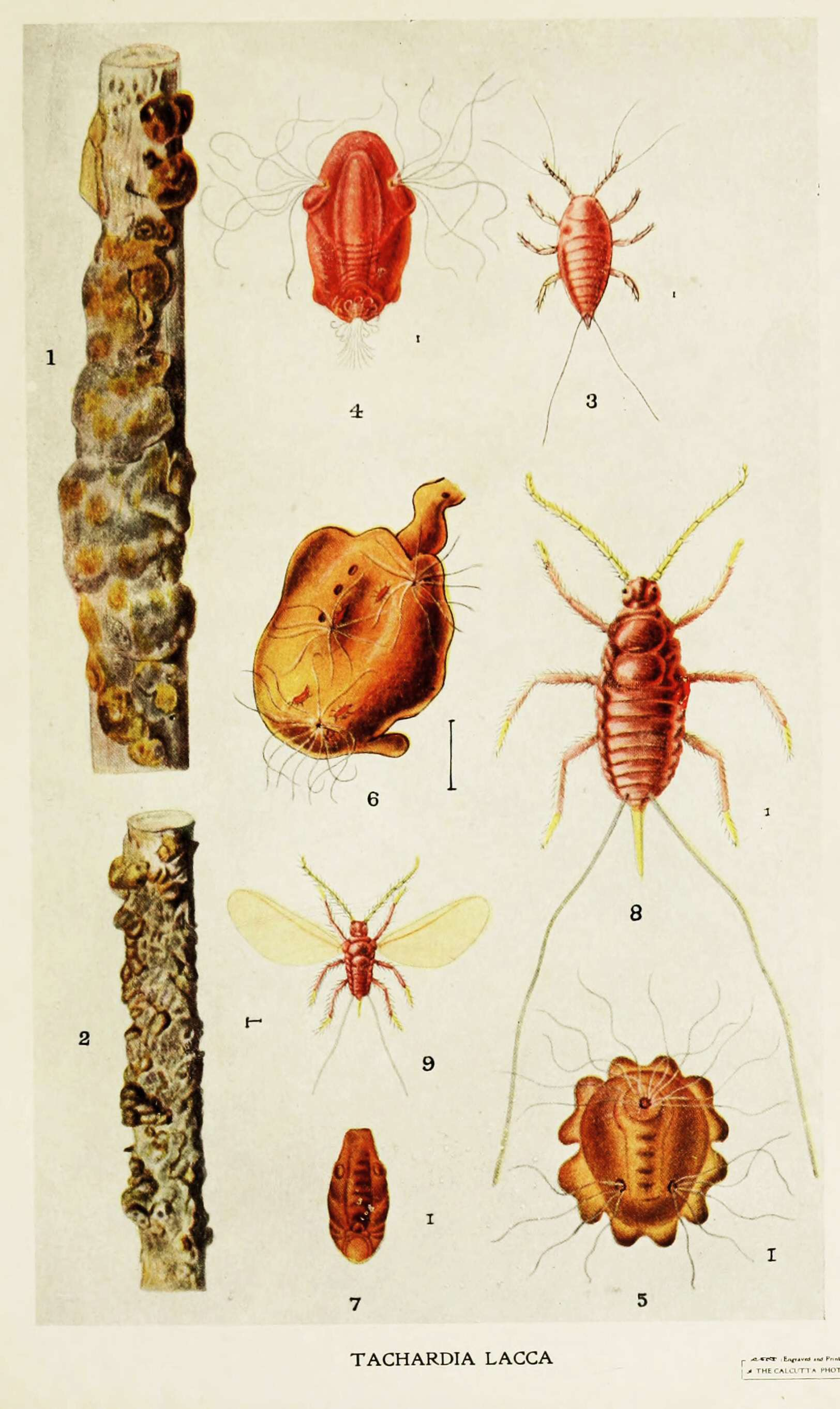
- Drawing of the insect Kerria lacca and its lac tubes, by Harold Maxwell-Lefroy, 1909

Scientific classification
- Domain: Eukaryota
- Kingdom: Animalia
- Phylum: Arthropoda
- Class: Insecta
- Order: Hemiptera
- Suborder: Sternorrhyncha
- Family: Kerriidae
- Genus: Kerria
- Species: K. lacca

Binomial name
- Kerria lacca (Kerr, 1782)

Synonyms
- Coccus lacca Kerr, 1782; Coccus ficus Fabricius, 1787; Chermes lacca Roxburgh, 1791; Carteria lacca Signoret, 1874; Lakshadia indica Mahdihassan, 1923; Tachardia lacca Chamberlin, 1923; Laccifer lacca Cockerell, 1924

= Kerria lacca =

Species of true bug

Kerria lacca is a species of insect in the family Kerriidae, the lac insects. These are in the superfamily Coccoidea, the scale insects. This species is perhaps the most commercially important lac insect, being a main source of lac, a resin which can be refined into shellac and other products. This insect is native to Asia.

== Biology ==
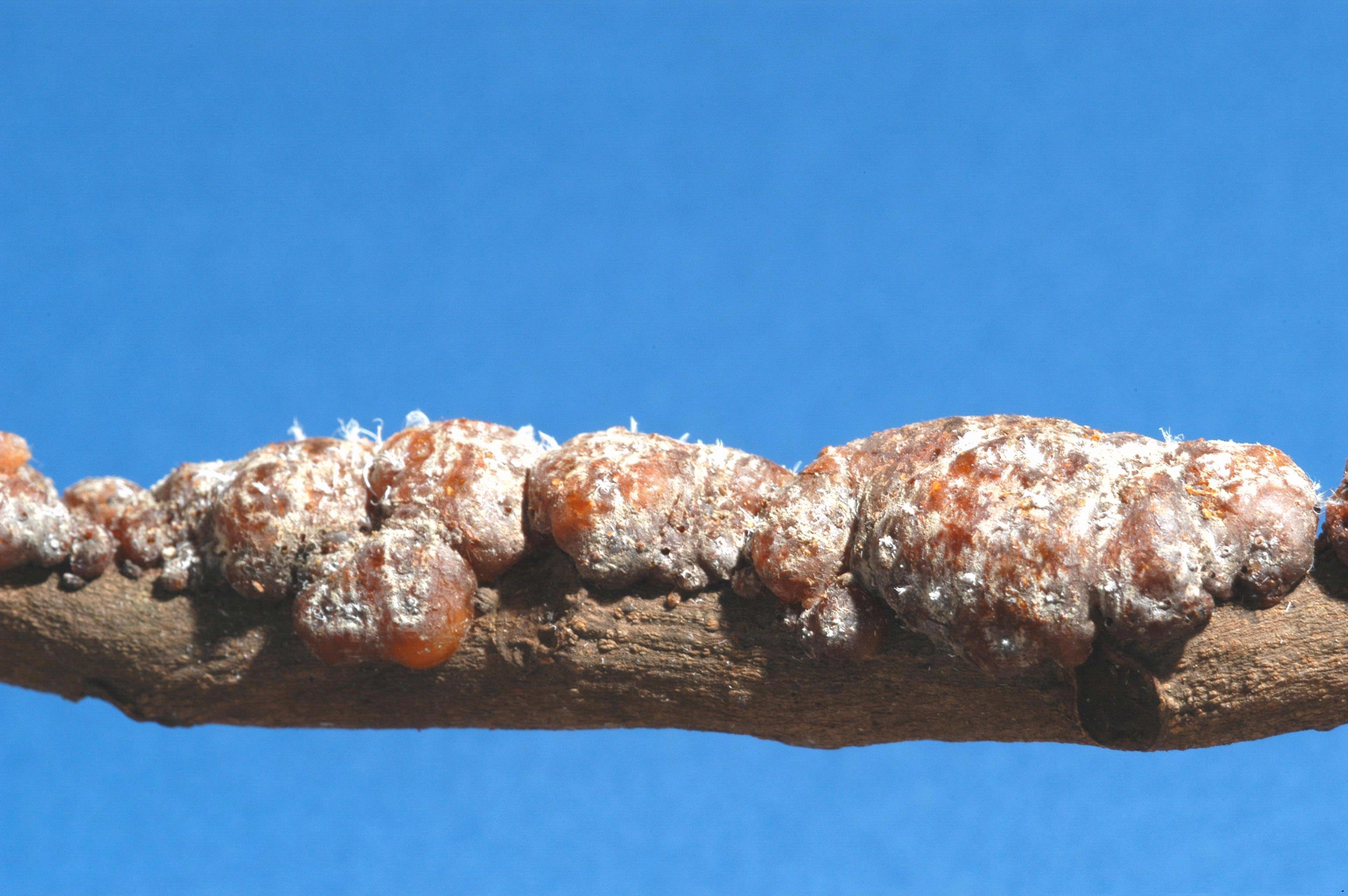
Lac tubes created by Kerria lacca

Kerria lacca produces a dye and a wax as natural secretions. The life cycle of this scale insect proceeds with the first instar of the larval stages, which are known as "crawlers". Larvae in this stage crawl along the branches of their host plants and feed on the phloem. As they pierce the branches to reach the phloem, they cover the holes with their wax secretions.

More than 400 host plants have been noted. Three are used for the majority of commercial cultivation of the insect: palas (Butea monosperma), kusum (Schleichera oleosa), and ber (Ziziphus mauritiana).

There are at least two strains of the insect that are characterized by aspects of their life cycle and their host plant preferences.

The species was described and given the binomial name Coccus lacca in 1781 (published formally in 1782) by the Scottish surgeon James Kerr (1737–1782) in Patna. It was then placed a new genus named after Kerr as Kerria in 1884 by Adolfo Targioni-Tozzetti (who had noted that it did not belong to Coccus even in1868).

Natural predators of this species include several parasitoids, such as the parasitoid wasps Tachardiaephagus tachardiae and Coccophagus tschirchii. Predators include the moths Eublemma roseonivia and Holcocera pulverea. These moths can interfere with lac cultivation in India.

These insects, as well as many types of fungal pathogens, form an ecological web that is important to local biodiversity.

Kerria lacca has been reported as a pest insect. It is reared on ber trees (Ziziphus mauritiana), but these trees are also cultivated for fruit, the Indian jujube. K. lacca sometimes invades Indian jujube orchards and degrades the fruit crop.

== Economy ==
Millions of people are engaged in the farming of lac insects. At least half of lac production occurs in India, where about 20,000 metric tons of raw lac are produced annually. It is a versatile product used in a wide array of applications, and demand for it in many industries provides economic resources that filter down to rural tribes. In Vietnam, the introduction of K. lacca cultivation has brought economic recovery to impoverished mountain villages and has helped to revegetate deforested hillsides. Demand, while still strong, is shrinking over time, reducing the economic viability of lac growing.

This species is also one of several similar insects used to produce a strong red dye historically used to color wool and silk. The dye originates in the hemolymph of the insect; the fluid analogous to blood.

While K. lacca is the most commonly cultivated species in many areas, the related K. yunnanensis is the most widely used species in China.

== Lac dye ==
Diverse body colors are reported, including crimson and yellow. Color differences are inherited as a unit character where crimson dominates to yellow. Wild type insect possesses crimson body colour due to the presence of a complex closely resembling water-soluble polyhydroxy-anthraquinones, collectively called lac dye. Apart from their usage in food and cosmetics, these anthraquinones also exhibit many pharmaceutical properties, including antibiotic, antiviral, antifeedant effect. A 2016 study has shown that the anthraquinone component of lac dye also possess antineoplastic or anticancer effects.

It was suggested that lac insects employ polyketide pathway catalysed by polyketide synthase to produce laccaic acid D, a common precursor molecule for the biosynthesis of other lac dye constituents. In 2025, it was found that a yeast-like endosymbiotic organism was responsible for the synthesis of the dye.

== Lac resin ==
Lac is the only commercial resin of animal origin and is a natural polymer. It is made up of hydroxy fatty acids, principally aleuritic acid (9,10,16-trihydroxyhexadecanoic acid), and hydroxy sesquiterpenic acids. A 2014 study proposes the possible biosynthetic pathway for the constituents of lac resin which identifies acetyl-CoA as a common precursor molecule and the role of prenyltransferases in the biosynthesis of sesquiterpenes along with cytochrome P450 enzyme.
