= Gulaal Gota =

Traditional element of Holi in Jaipur

The Gulaal Gota (Hindi: गुलाल गोटा, lit. 'color ball') is a small, spherical container made from lac, filled with dry Gulal powder, used for celebrating the Hindu festival of Holi. It is a traditional element of Holi celebrations in Jaipur, Rajasthan, India, with a history dating back around 300 or 400 years.

== History ==
The use of Gulal Gotas can be traced back to the time of the erstwhile Jaipur royal family. According to legends, Gulal Gotas were a favoured way for the royals to play Holi. These handcrafted balls are made by the Muslim artisan community known as Manihars in Jaipur.

The Indian government has provided "artisan cards" to artisans of Gulaal Gota, granting them access to various benefits under government schemes. There is demand from Gulaal Gota makers who have asked for a Geographical Indication (GI) tag to safeguard their product and promote its unique regional identity.

== Production ==
The lac, a resin secreted by lac insects, is sourced from regions like Chhattisgarh and Jharkhand. The artisans begin by boiling the lac in water to make it pliable. This softened lac is then shaped and coloured, with red, yellow, and green being the base colours used for further combinations. Once shaped and coloured, the lac is heated and blown into a small sphere with the help of a special tool called a Phunkni (blower). The final step involves filling these hollow lac spheres with dry gulal powder before sealing them. The production process is entirely manual and requires skilled artisans.

== Holi ==
During Holi celebrations, people throw Gulaal Gotas at each other. Upon impact, the lac shell breaks, releasing the coloured powder and creating an explosion of colour. Compared to throwing loose gulaal powder, Gulaal Gotas offer a more controlled and targeted way to play with colours.

There are concerns about the continuity of this tradition as younger generations may not be as interested in pursuing this craft.

== See also ==
- Gulal
- Holi
- Lac (resin)
