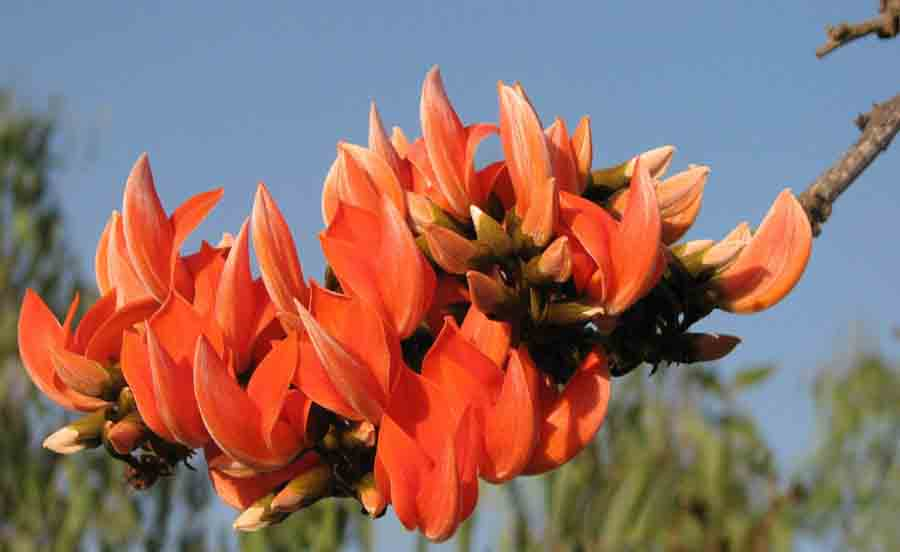

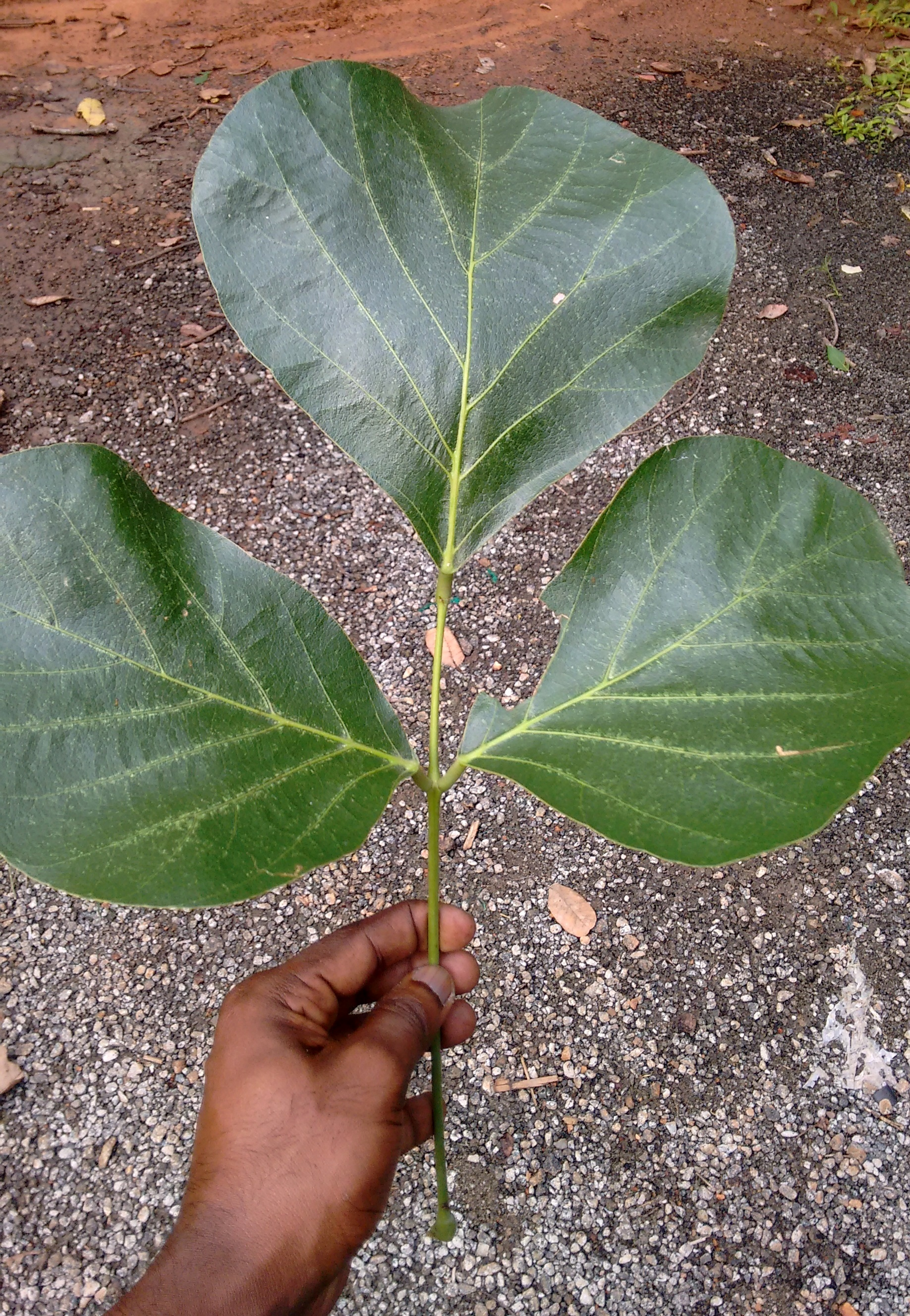
- Top: inflorescence, bottom: leaf

Scientific classification
- Kingdom: Plantae
- Clade: Tracheophytes
- Clade: Angiosperms
- Clade: Eudicots
- Clade: Rosids
- Order: Fabales
- Family: Fabaceae
- Subfamily: Faboideae
- Genus: Butea
- Species: B. monosperma

Binomial name
- Butea monosperma (Lam.) Taub.

Synonyms
- Butea frondosa Roxb. ex Willd.; Erythrina monosperma Lam.; Plaso monosperma (Lam.) Kuntze

= Butea monosperma =

Species of legume

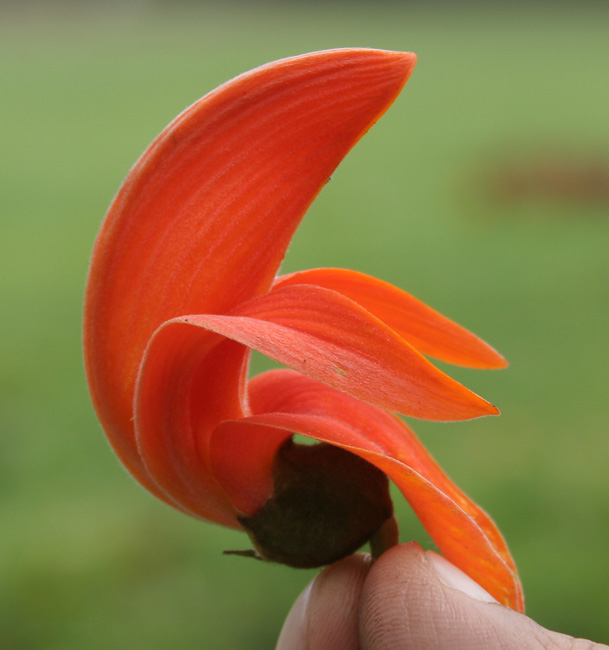
A single flower in Kolkata, West Bengal, India. The beak-shaped keel petal gave rise to the name "parrot tree".

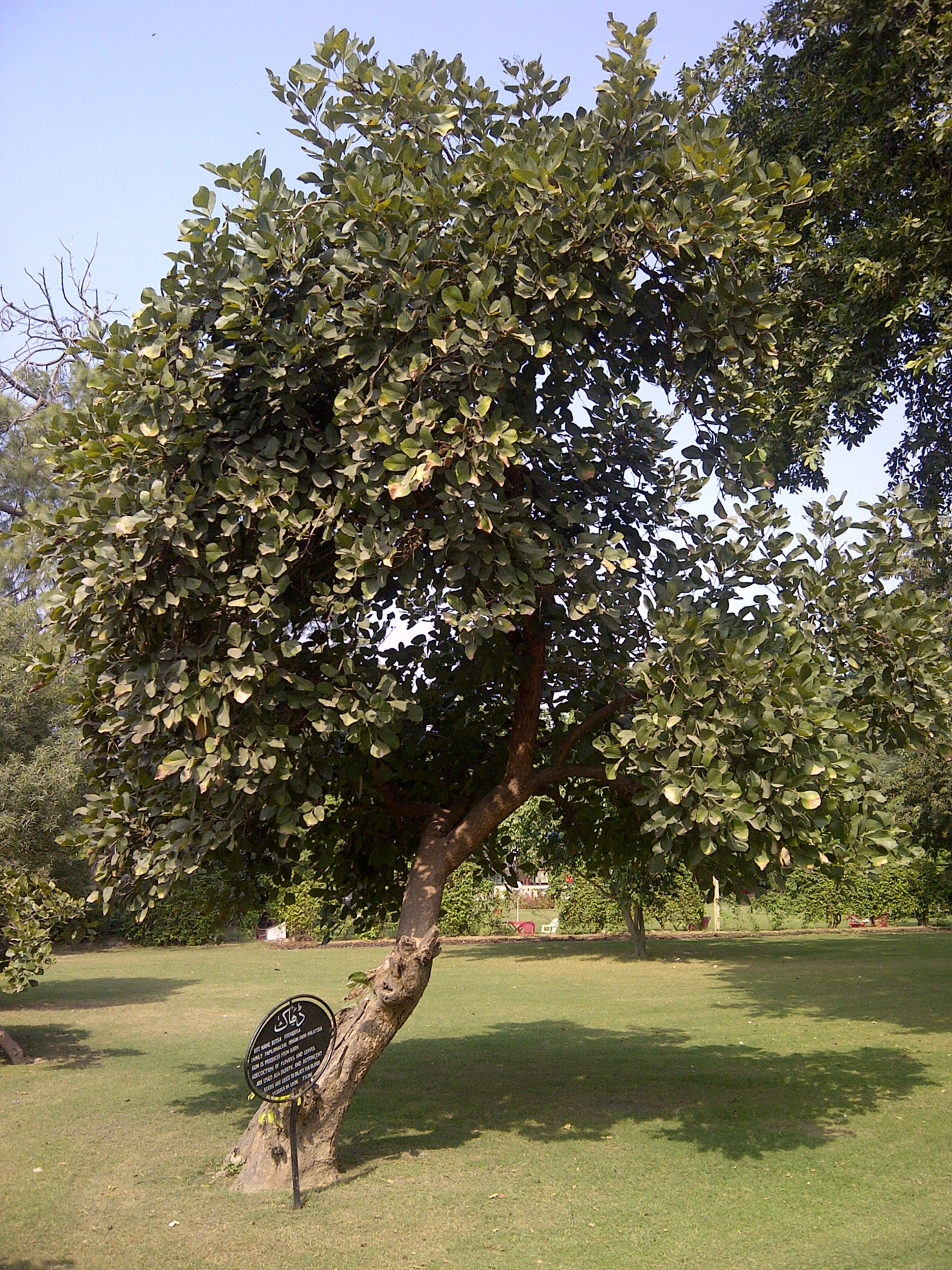
Habit of B. monosperma in Bagh-e-Jinnah, Lahore

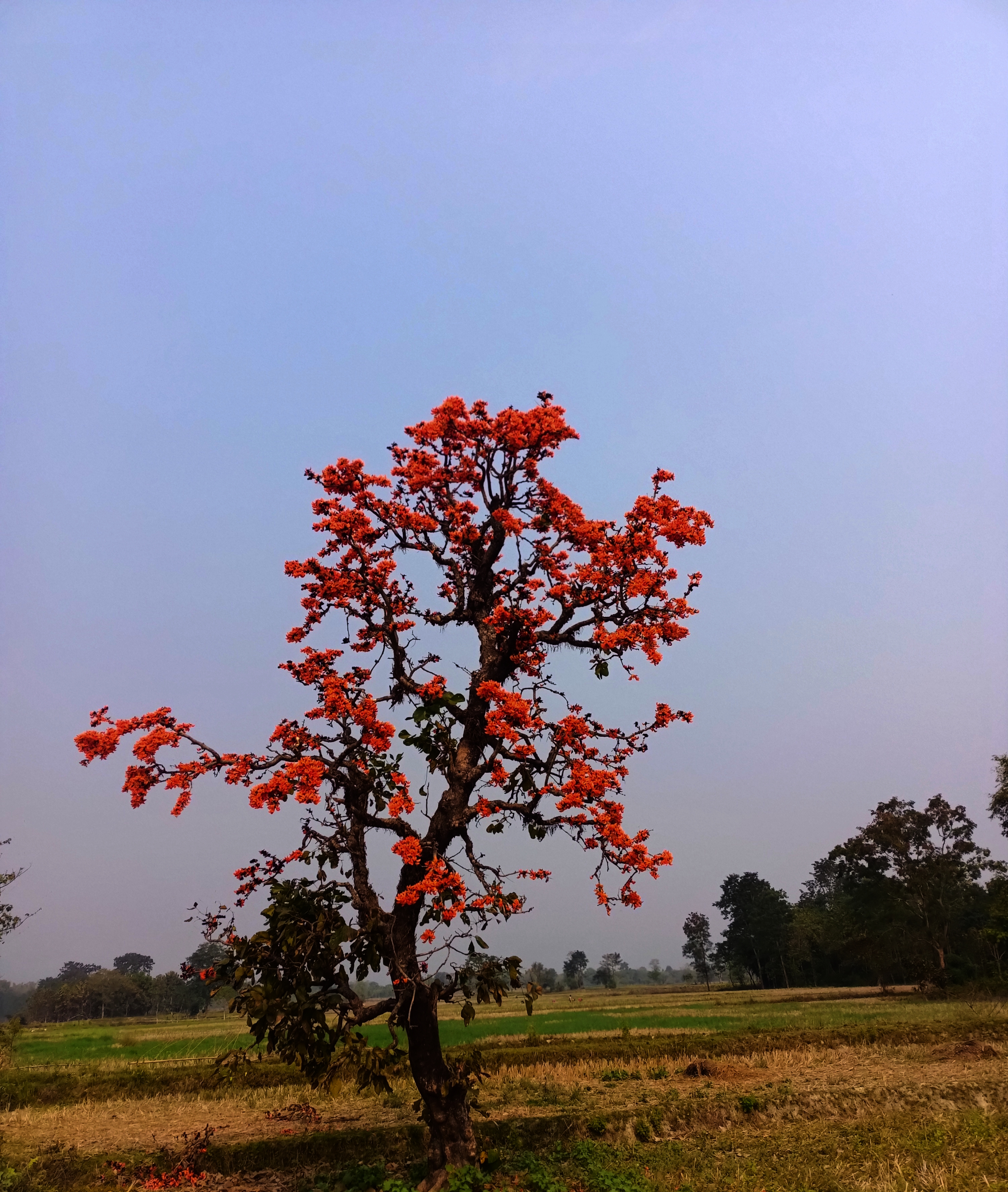
The blooming butea monosperma in Assam, Baksa

Butea monosperma is a species of Butea native to tropical and sub-tropical parts of South Asia and Southeast Asia. It is also known as flame of the forest, Bengal kino, dhak, palash, and bastard teak. Revered as sacred by Hindus, it is prized for producing an abundance of vivid blooms, and it is also cultivated elsewhere as an ornamental.

The plant grows across Bangladesh, India, Nepal, Pakistan, Sri Lanka, Myanmar, Thailand, Laos, Cambodia, Vietnam, Malaysia, and western Indonesia.

== Description ==
Butea monosperma is a small-sized dry-season deciduous tree, growing to 15 m (49 ft) tall. It is slow-growing: young trees have a growth rate of a few feet per year. The leaves are pinnate, with an 8–16 cm (3.1–6.3 in) petiole and three leaflets. Each leaflet is 10–20 cm (3.9–7.9 in) long. The flowers are 2.5 cm (0.98 in) long, bright orange-red, and produced in racemes up to 15 cm (5.9 in) long. The fruit is a pod 15–20 cm (5.9–7.9 in) long and 4–5 cm (1.6–2.0 in) broad.

The flowers frequently have a spectacular bloom sometime from February to April, although the trees do not flower every year. Each flower features five petals, two wings, and a keel that resembles the curled beak of a parrot. If the winter season is too cold, too dry, or too rainy, trees may not blossom.

== History ==
Historically, palash originated in Bihar and Jharkhand. Dhak forests covered much of the Doaba area between the Ganges and the Yamuna rivers, but these were cleared for agriculture in the early 19th century as the English East India Company increased tax demands on the peasants.

== Use ==
The plant is used to make timber, resin, fodder, and dye. The wood is dirty white and soft. Being durable under water, it is used for well curbs and water scoops. Spoons and ladles made of its wood are used in various Hindu rituals to pour ghee into the fire. Good charcoal can be obtained from it. Farmers typically plant trees on field bunds and use them to reduce soil erosion. Young shoots are grazed by buffaloes as fodder. The leaves were once used to serve food where plastic plates would be used today.

Fixed oil in the seed and glucoside butrin of the flower sap are considered to be poisonous. Its consumption may cause dizziness, headache, and hypotension.

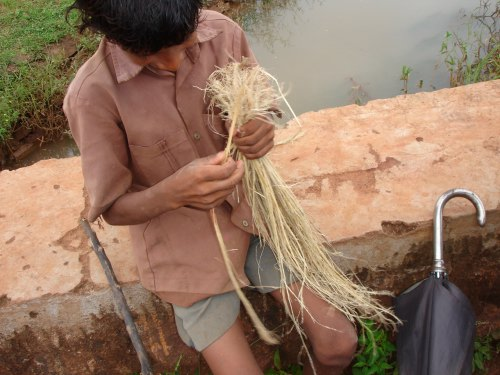
A young cowherd preparing bankh from Butea roots

=== Lac production ===
In India, the tree serves as a crucial host for the lac bug (Laccifer lacca), which creates shellac. It produces the most lac sticks per hectare of any lac tree.

=== Leather production ===
The bark produces a crimson exudate that, when dried, hardens into a substance called "Butea gum" or "Bengal kino". The gum is considered valuable by druggists because of its astringent qualities and by leather workers because of its tannin.

=== Dye ===
The flowers are used to prepare a traditional Holi colour called "kesari". It is also used as a dye for fabric. Butein, a vibrant yellow to deep orange-red dye made from the flowers, is used mostly for dying silk and occasionally for dying cotton. Hindus ink their foreheads with this colour.

== Literature ==
The plant is known as palāśa in Sanskrit and is found in Sanskrit texts including the Rigveda and Yajur Veda. The first sloka of the Sukla Yajurveda speaks about the Palasa tree. The Palasa tree branch is cut and trimmed by the Adhvaryu priest who performed the practical part of sacrifice, the day before a new moon or a full moon, and used it to drive the calves away from cows whose milk was to form a part of the offerings for the next day's special ceremony.

The flame of the forest is mentioned in the description of the landscape of Punjab in Khushwant Singh's A History of the Sikhs Vol. 1. He writes, "While the margosa is still strewing the earth with its brittle ochre leaves, the silk cotton, the coral and the flame of the forest burst into flowers of bright crimson, red, and orange." References to this tree are often found in Punjabi literature. The Punjabi poet Harinder Singh Mehboob employed its symbolism in his poems.

In Rudyard Kipling's short story Beyond the Pale (contained in Plain Tales from the Hills, published in 1888), he says of the dhak: The flower of the dhak means diversely "desire", "come", "write", or "danger", according to the other things with it. The tree was also featured in The Jungle Book in the story Tiger! Tiger! as the tree Mowgli instructs his wolf-brother Grey Brother to wait under for a signal that Shere Khan has returned.

== Cultural associations ==
According to legend, the tree sprang from a falcon's feather that was infused with soma. The right side of Yama's body is where the plant, according to Vayupurana, had its start. This lovely tree is revered by both Hindus and Buddhists. It is said to have used as the tree for achieved enlightenment, or Bodhi by second Lord Buddha Medhaṅkara Buddha.

In West Bengal, it is associated with spring, especially through the poems and songs of Nobel Laureate Rabindranath Tagore, who likened its bright orange flame-like flower to fire. In Santiniketan, where Tagore and Vishalnarayan lived, this flower has become an indispensable part of the celebration of spring. The plant has lent its name to the town of Palashi, famous for the historic Battle of Plassey fought there.

In the state of Jharkhand, palash is associated with folk tradition. Many folk literary expressions describe palash as the forest fire. The beauty of dry deciduous forests of Jharkhand reach their height when most trees have shed their leaves and the Palash is in its full bloom. Palash is also the State Flower of Jharkhand.

It is said that the tree is a form of Agni, the God of fire and war. In Telangana, these flowers are specially used in the worship of Shiva on occasion of Shivaratri. In Telugu, this tree is called Moduga chettu.

In Kerala, it is called plasu, chamata or vishalnarayan. Chamata is the vernacular version of Sanskrit word harinee, small piece of wood that is used for agnihotra or the fire ritual. In most of the old Nambudiri (Kerala Brahmin) houses, one can find this tree because this is widely used for their fire ritual. Tamil Brahmins have a daily agnihotra ritual called Samidha Dhanan, where barks of this tree is a main component for agnihotra, and this ritual is very essential for brahmacharis during the first year of brahmacharya.

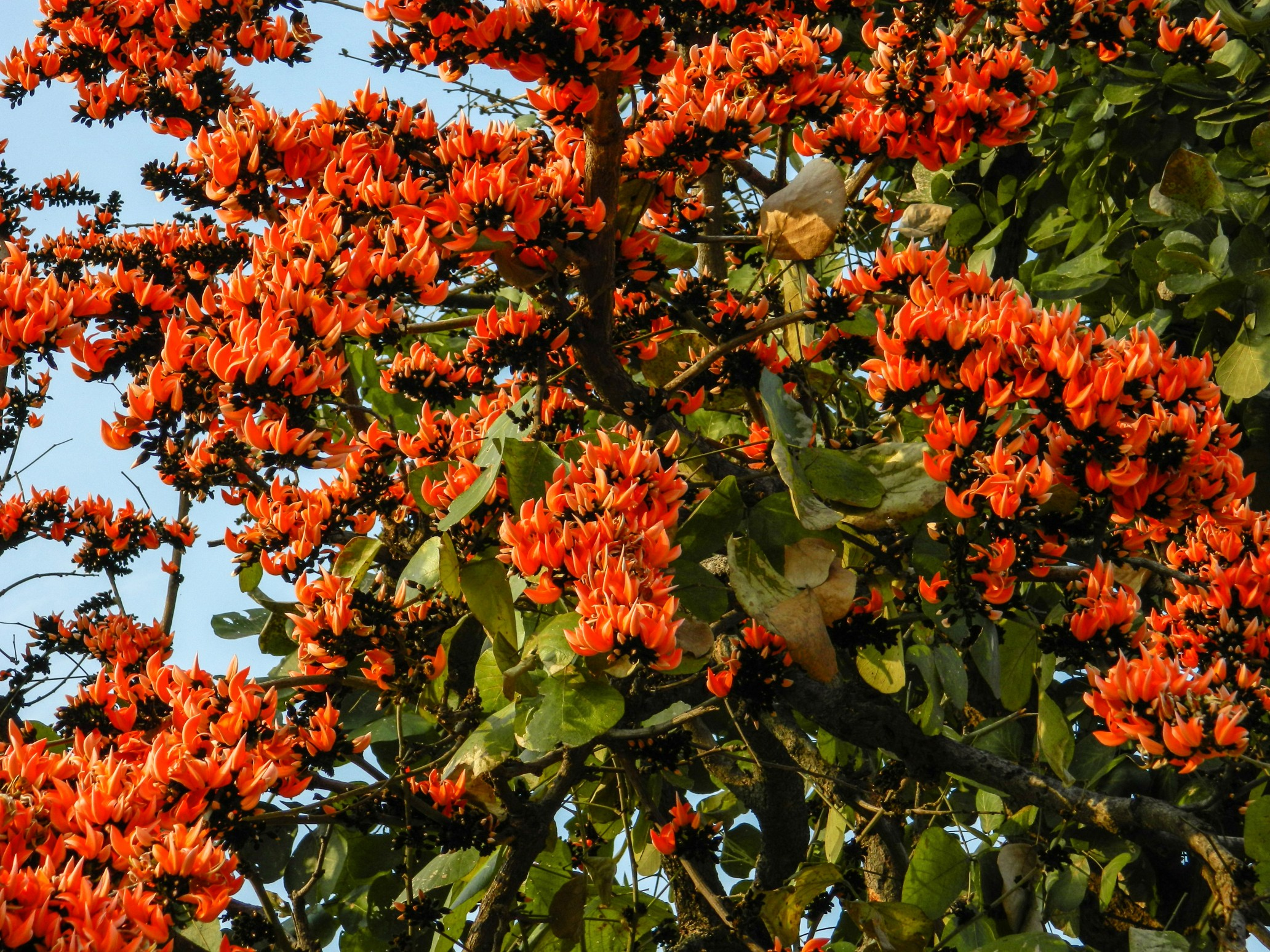
Palash in full bloom at Ranchi in Jharkhand, India

== Gita Govinda ==
In Sanskrit, the flower is extensively used as a symbol for the arrival of spring and the colour of love. Jayadeva in the Gita Govinda compares these blossoms to the red nails of Kamadeva or Cupid, with which the latter wounds the hearts of lovers. The imagery is all the more appropriate as the blossoms are compared to a net of kimsuka flowers (किंशुकजाले). In a completely leafless tree, the blossoms look like a net.

The following stanza is translated by Barbara Stoller Miller; for kimsuka blossoms, she uses the common name "flame tree petals":

मृगमदसौरभरभसवशंवदनवदलमालतमाले।
युवजनहृदयविदारणमनसिजनखरुचिकिंशुकजाले॥

Tamala tree's fresh leaves absorb strong scent of deer musk.
Flame tree petals, shining nails of love, tear at young hearts.

Gita Govinda of Jayadeva, Love Song of the Dark Lord, Motilal Banarsidass

== Gallery ==
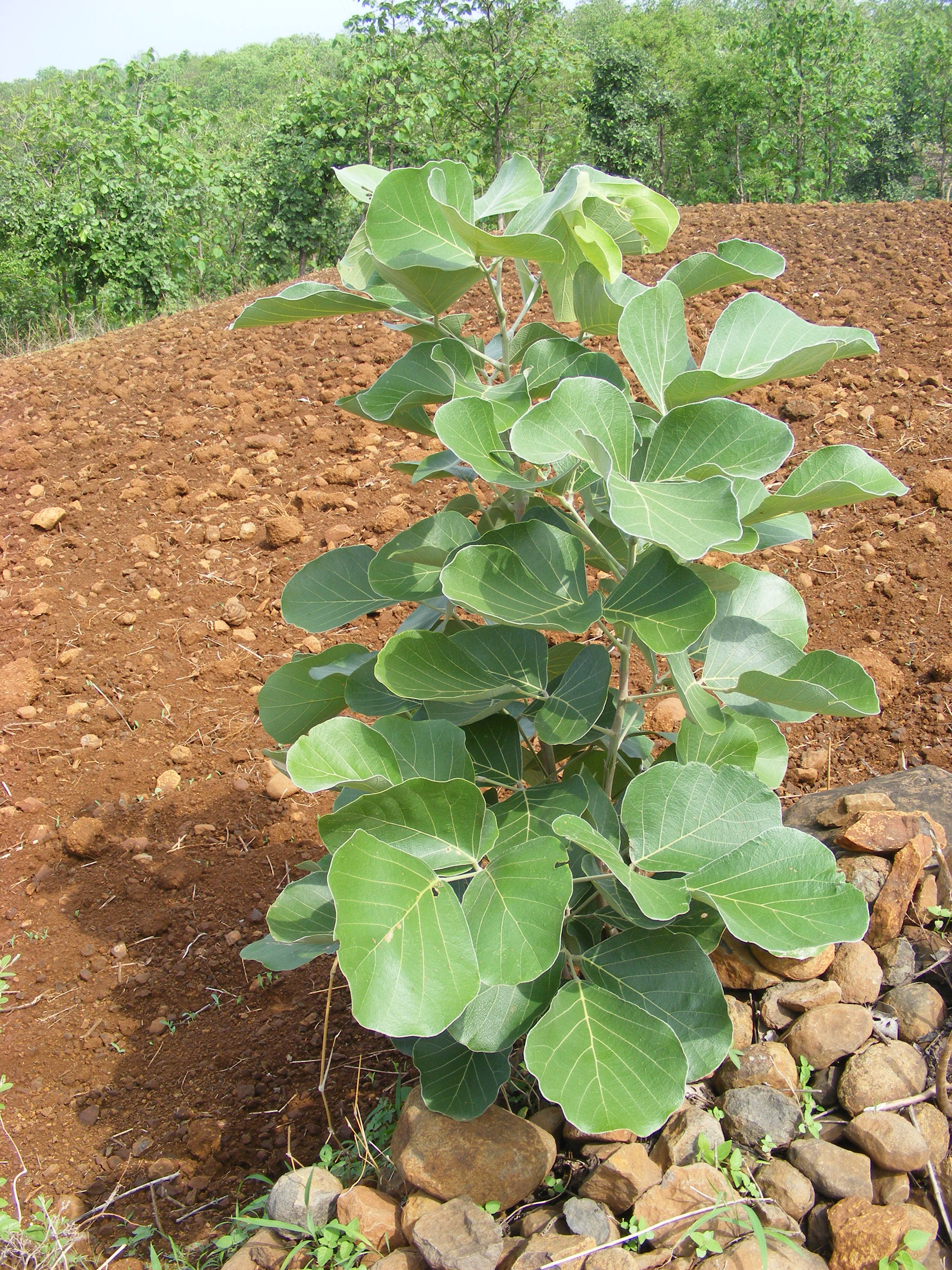
habit of a sapling

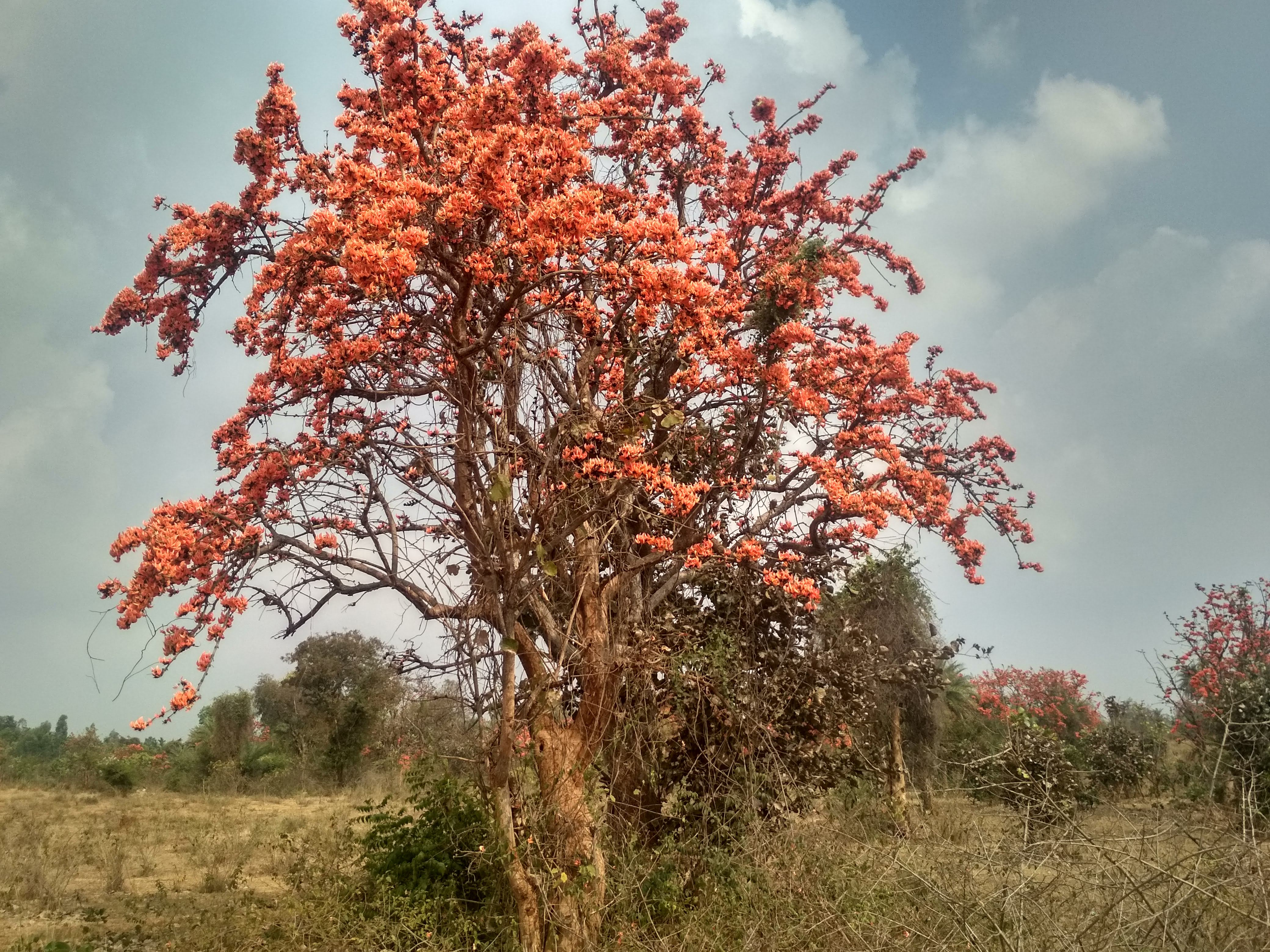
in full bloom, late January

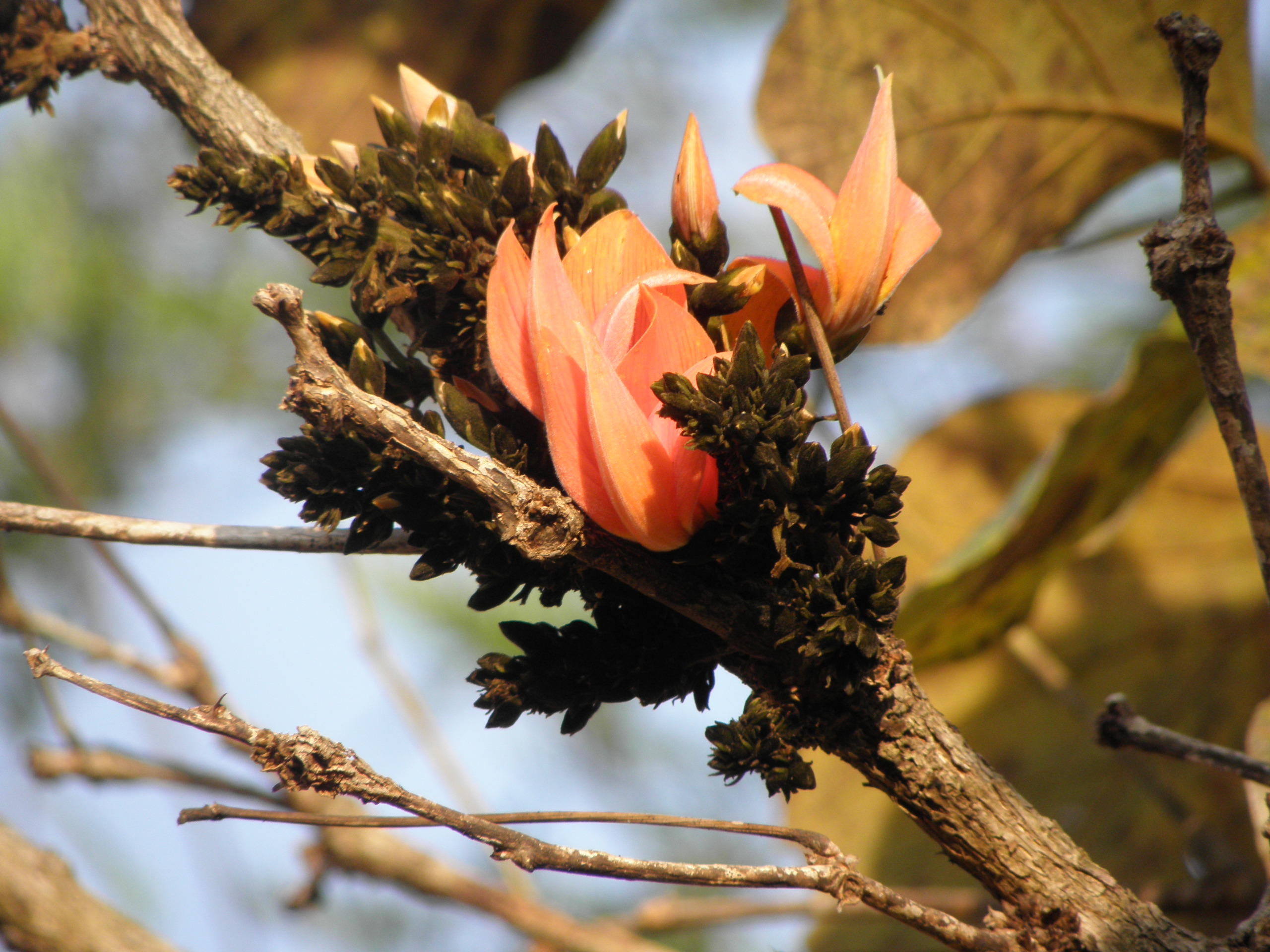
dark flower buds in February

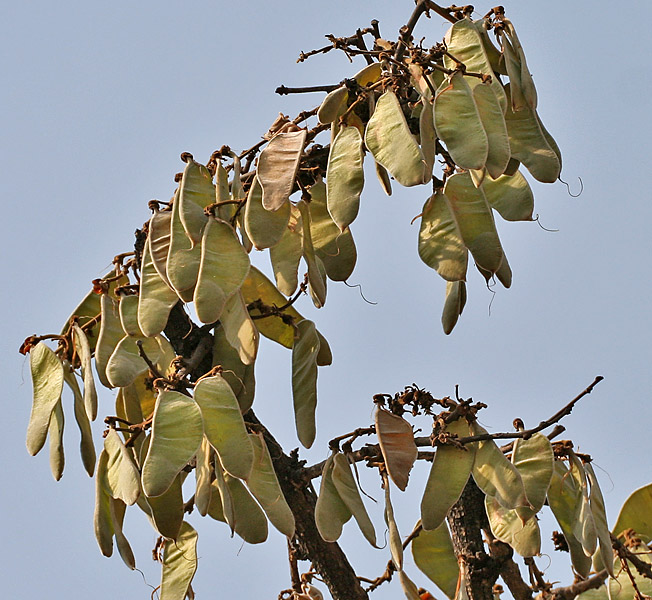
green seed pods, early April

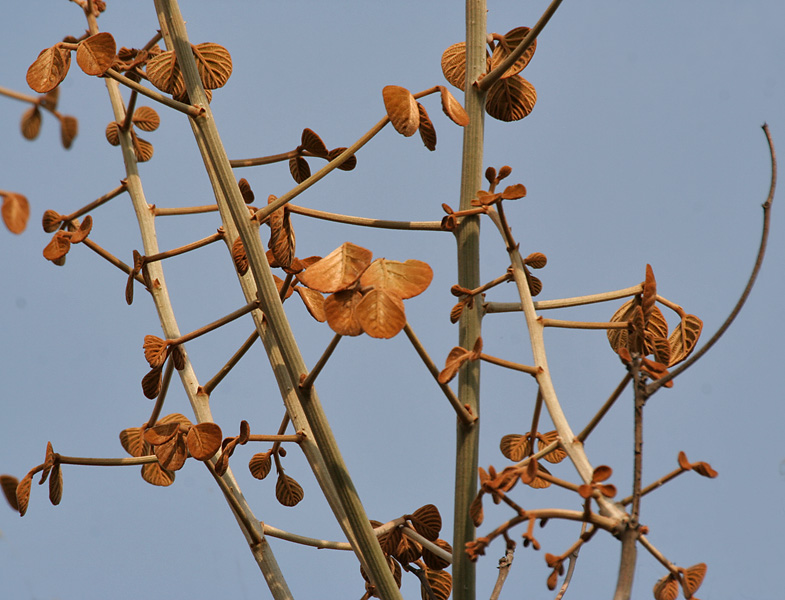
flushes of new leaves, mid-April

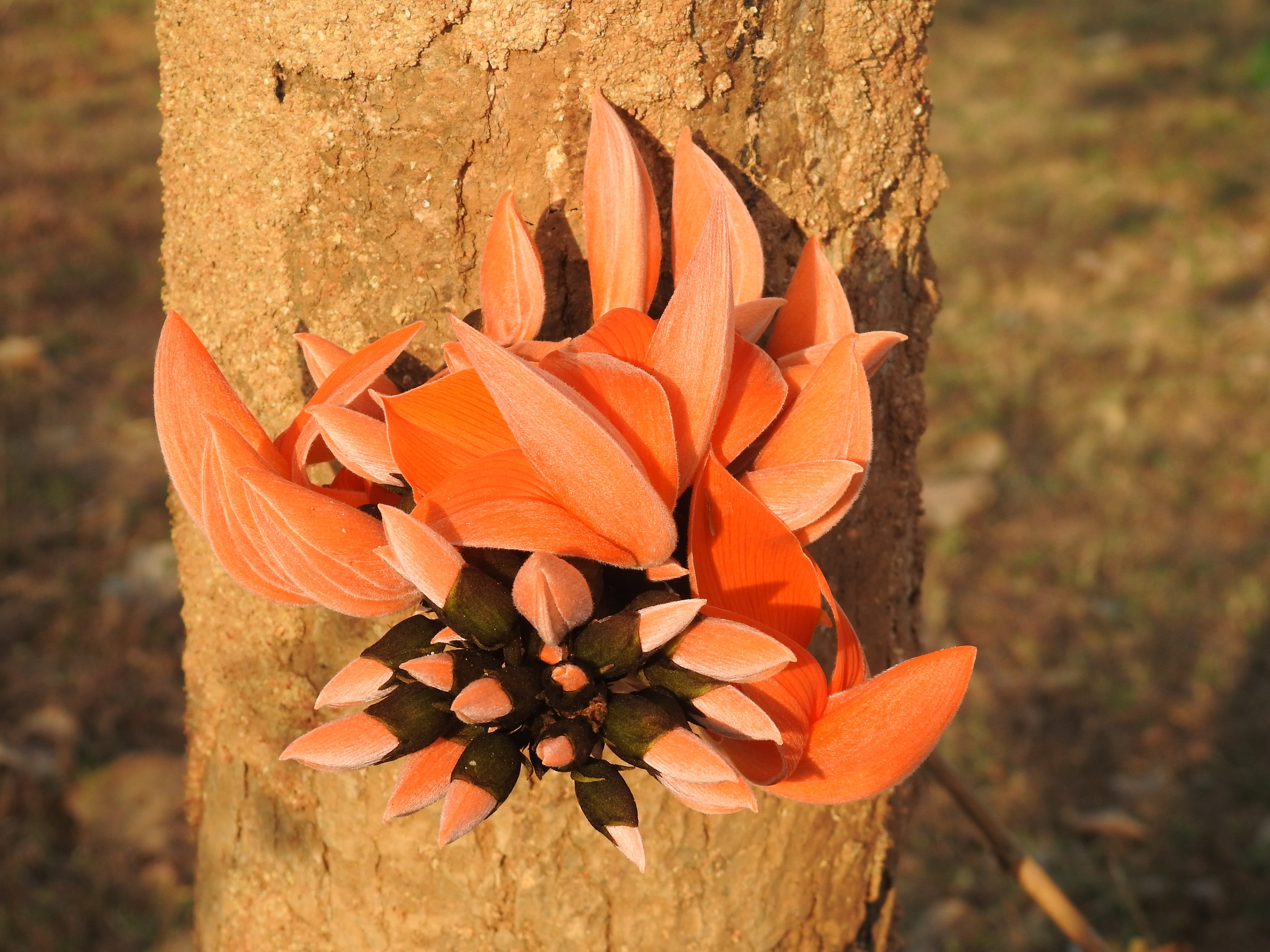
Butea monosperma buds coming out of trunk
