= Kerria =

Kerria may refer to:

- Kerria (insect), a genus of scale insects in the family Kerriidae
- Kerria (plant), a genus of flowering plants in the family Rosaceae
