= Resinous glaze =

Food-grade shellac

Resinous glaze is an alcohol-based solution of various types of food-grade shellac. The shellac is derived from the raw material sticklac, which is a resin scraped from the branches of trees left from when the small insect Kerria lacca (also known as Laccifer lacca) creates a hard, waterproof cocoon. When used in food and confections, it is also known as confectioner's glaze, pure food glaze, natural glaze, or confectioner's resin. When used on medicines, it is sometimes called pharmaceutical glaze.

Pharmaceutical glaze may contain 20–51% shellac in solution in ethyl alcohol (grain alcohol) that has not been denatured (denatured alcohol is poisonous), waxes, and titanium dioxide as an opacifying agent. Confectioner’s glaze used for candy contains roughly 35% shellac, while the remaining components are volatile organic compounds that evaporate after the glaze is applied.

Pharmaceutical glaze is used by the drug and nutritional supplement industry as a coating material for tablets and capsules. It serves to improve the product's appearance, extend shelf life and protect it from moisture, as well as provide a solid finishing film for pre-print coatings. It also serves to mask unpleasant odors and aid in the swallowing of the tablet.

The shellac coating is insoluble in stomach acid and may make the tablet difficult for the body to break down or assimilate. For this reason, it can also be used as an ingredient in time-released, sustained or delayed-action pills. The product is listed on the U.S. Food and Drug Administration's (FDA) inactive ingredient list.

Shellac is labeled as GRAS (generally recognized as safe) by the U.S. FDA and is used as glaze for several types of foods, including some fruit, coffee beans, chewing gum, and candy. Examples of candies containing shellac include candy corn, Hershey's Whoppers and Milk Duds, Nestlé's Raisinets and Goobers, Tootsie Roll Industries's Junior Mints and Sugar Babies, Jelly Belly's jelly beans and Mint Cremes, Russell Stover's jelly beans, and several candies by Godiva Chocolatier and Gertrude Hawk. M&M's do not contain shellac.

A competing non-animal-based product is zein, a corn protein. It is preferred by some vegans because shellac production can kill many insects.
