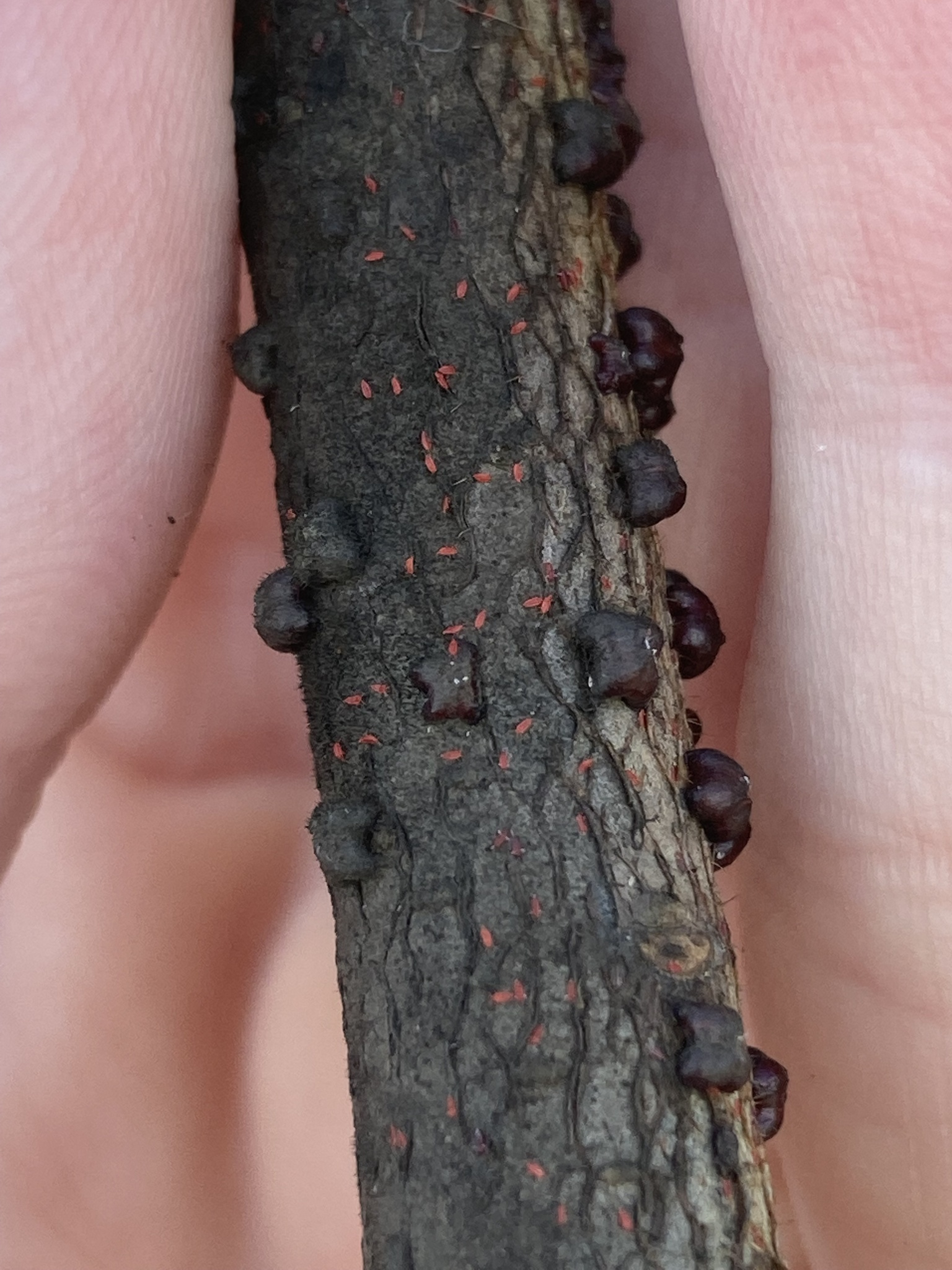
- Nymphs and adults on Wax Myrtle

Scientific classification
- Domain: Eukaryota
- Kingdom: Animalia
- Phylum: Arthropoda
- Class: Insecta
- Order: Hemiptera
- Suborder: Sternorrhyncha
- Family: Kerriidae
- Genus: Paratachardina
- Species: P. pseudolobata

Binomial name
- Paratachardina pseudolobata Kondo & Gullan, 2007

= Paratachardina pseudolobata =

Species of true bug

Paratachardina pseudolobata, the lobate lac scale, is a polyphagous and pestiferous lac scale insect, which damages trees and woody shrubs in Cuba, Florida, the Bahamas and the Australian territory of Christmas Island. It was mistakenly identified as Paratachardina lobata (Chamberlin), an insect native to India and Sri Lanka, but was in 2007 recognized and named as a distinct species based on material from Florida; its native distribution is as yet unknown. The new lac insect was described based on all stages of the female (adult, second-instar nymph and first-instar nymph), during the revision of the genus Paratachardina, wherein all its known species were redescribed.

== Biology ==
The lobate lac insect is known to feed on more than 300 plant species. It reproduces parthenogenetically, in contrast with the morphologically similar P. lobata, which reproduces sexually.
