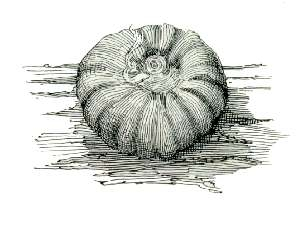
- Paratachardina decorella from CSIRO

Scientific classification
- Domain: Eukaryota
- Kingdom: Animalia
- Phylum: Arthropoda
- Class: Insecta
- Order: Hemiptera
- Suborder: Sternorrhyncha
- Family: Kerriidae
- Genus: Paratachardina; Balachowsky, 1950

= Paratachardina =

Genus of insects

Paratachardina is a genus of true bugs belonging to the family Kerriidae.

The species of this genus are found in Central America and Australia.

Species:

- Paratachardina capsella Wang, 1986
- Paratachardina decorella (Maskell, 1893)
- Paratachardina javanensis Kondo & Gullan, 2011
- Paratachardina lobata
- Paratachardina mahdihassani Kondo & Gullan, 2007
- Paratachardina minuta (Morrison, 1920)
- Paratachardina mithila Varshney, 1976
- Paratachardina morobensis Williams & Watson, 1990
- Paratachardina pseudolobata Kondo & Gullan, 2007
- Paratachardina silvestrii (Mahdihassan, 1923)
- Paratachardina ternata (Chamberlin, 1923)
- Paratachardina theae (Green, 1907)
