= Medhaṅkara Buddha =

Second of the 28 Buddhas in Pali literature

- Sanskrit: Medhaṃkara
- Pāli: Medhaṅkara
- Burmese: မေဓင်္ကရာ ဘုရား

Information
- Venerated by: Theravada, Mahayana, Vajrayana

Medhaṅkara Buddha is the second of the 28 Buddhas in certain traditions who preceded the historical Gautama Buddha. He was also the second Buddha of the Sāramaṇḍa kalpa.

In the Buddhavamsa, he is briefly mentioned as:

Inneumarable aeons ago, Taṇhaṅkara Buddha, Medhaṅkara Buddha, Saraṇaṅkara Buddha and Dīpaṃkara Buddha were born in the Sāramaṇḍa kalpa.

== Biography ==
He was born in Yaghara to King Sudeva and Queen Yasodharā. When he became an adult, he succeeded his father and reigned over the country for 8,000 years. When he saw the Four sights, he decided to leave the castle. As soon as his son was born, he left to practice in the forest. He had practiced asceticism for half a month (15 days). He gained enlightenment under the Bodhi tree, Butea monosperma.

The then-incarnation of Gautama Buddha had a chance to see him. He became a disciple of Medhaṅkara Buddha and asked for his wish. However, Medhaṅkara Buddha did not grant his wish. After death, the incarnation became a Deva at the Desire realm.

Medhaṅkara Buddha lived for 90,000 years. He had liberated many beings. He attained parinibbāna along with his disciples.
