= Lac (resin) =

Resinous secretion of lac insects

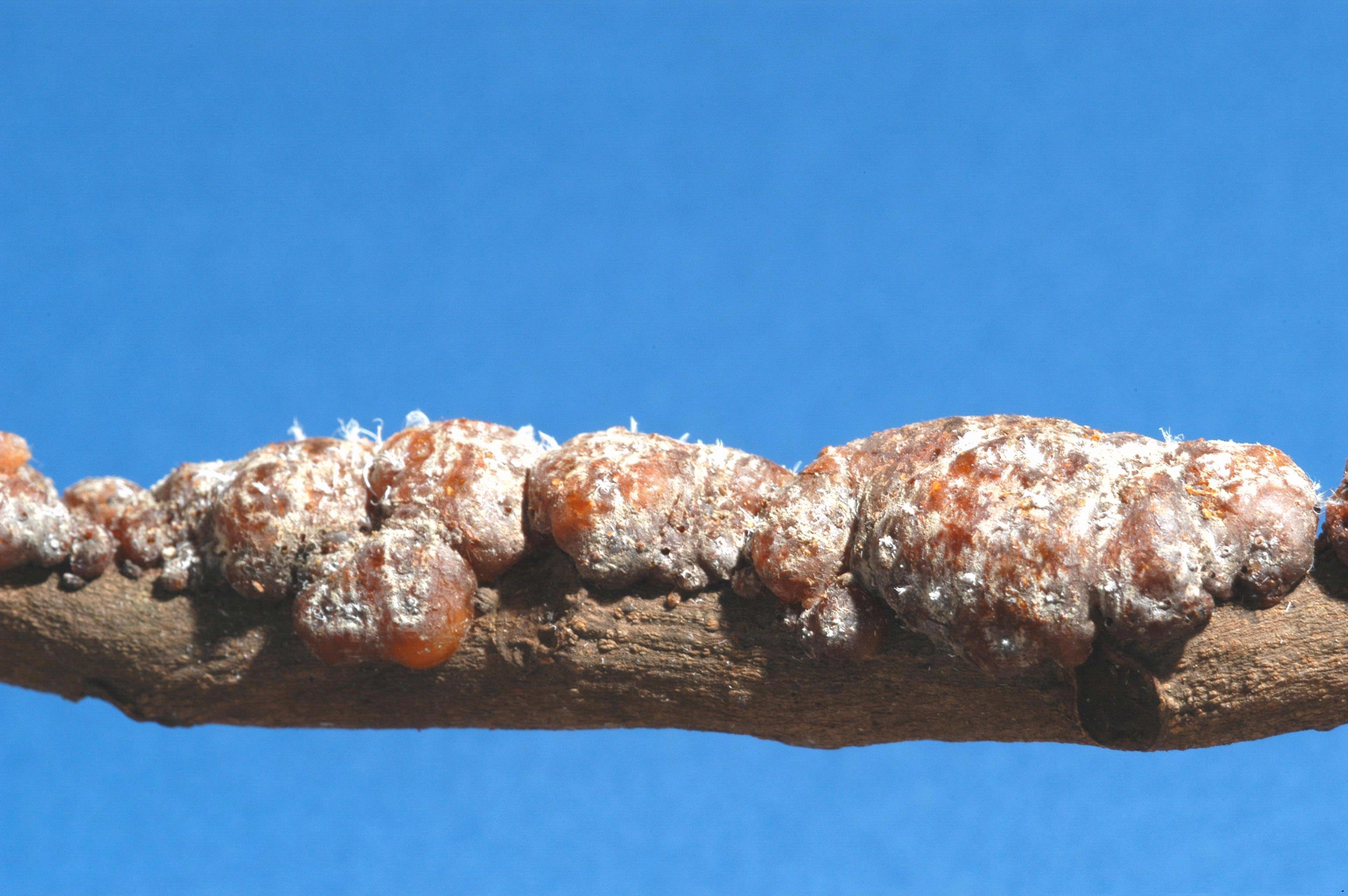
Lac tubes created by Kerria lacca

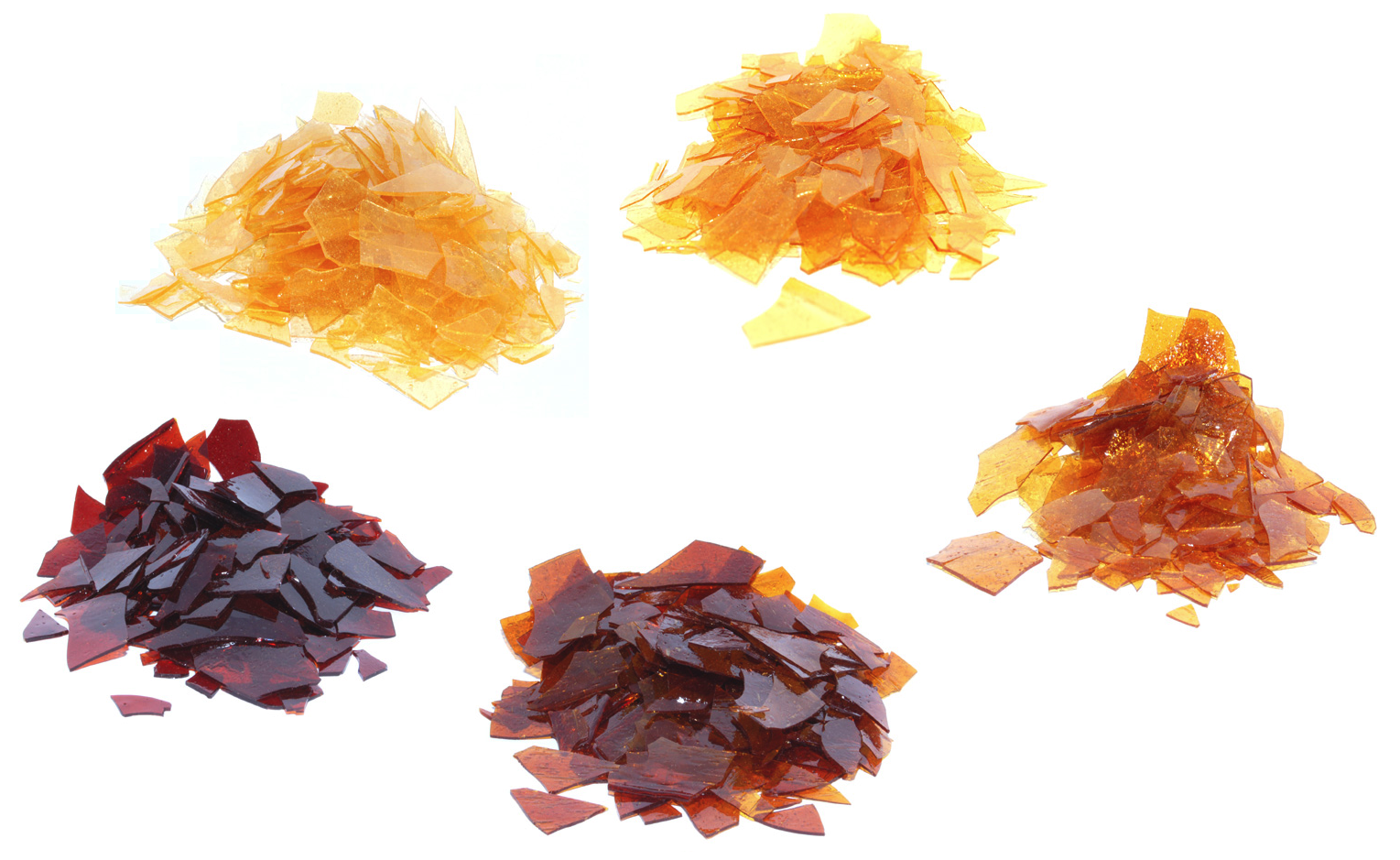
Resin secreted by the female lac bug on trees is processed and sold as dry flakes.

Lac is the resinous secretion of a number of species of lac insects, of which the most commonly cultivated is Kerria lacca.

Cultivation begins when a farmer gets a stick that contains eggs ready to hatch and ties it to the tree to be infested. Thousands of lac insects colonize the branches of the host trees and secrete the resinous pigment. The coated branches of the host trees are cut and harvested as sticklac.

The harvested sticklac is crushed and sieved to remove impurities. The sieved material is then repeatedly washed to remove insect parts and other material. The resulting product is known as seedlac. The prefix seed refers to its pellet shape. Seedlac, which still contains 3–5% impurity, is processed into shellac by heat treatment or solvent extraction.

The leading producer of lac is Jharkhand, followed by the Chhattisgarh, West Bengal, and Maharashtra states of India. Lac production is also found in Bangladesh, Myanmar, Thailand, Laos, Vietnam, parts of China, and Mexico.

== Etymology ==
The word lac is derived from the Sanskrit word lākshā (लाक्षा) representing the number 100 thousand, which was used for both the lac insect (because of their enormous number) and the scarlet resinous secretion it produces that was used as wood finish, lacquerware, skin cosmetic, ornaments and dye for wool and silk in ancient India and neighbouring areas. Lac resin was once imported in sizeable quantity into Europe from India along with Eastern woods. These were being used very widely.

== Host trees ==
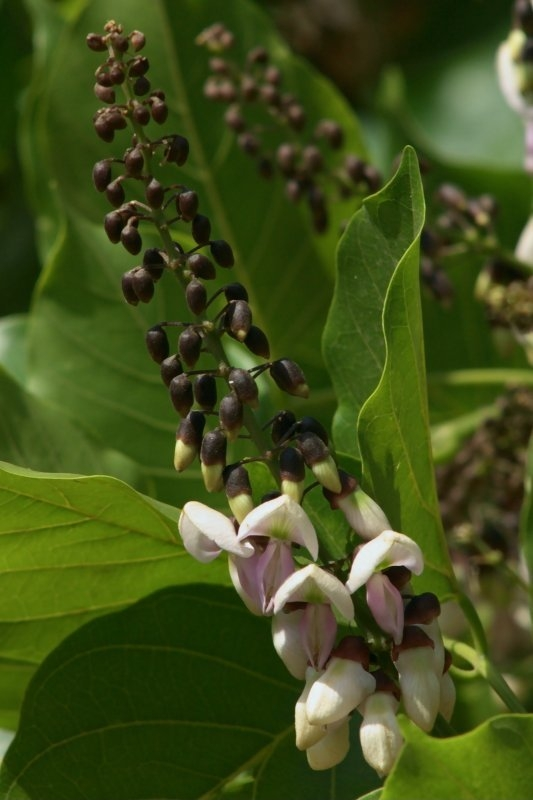
Pongam or honge (Millettia pinnata) is a native of India and grows in profusion, generally planted as avenue trees by the forest department. It is renowned for its shade and is well known in traditional uses for its medicinal properties. It is also grown as a host plant for lac insects. The tree is also one of the food plants for common cerulean (Jamides celeno).

Kerria lacca can be cultivated on either cultivated or wild host plants.

- In India the most common host plants are:
  - Dhak (Butea monosperma)
  - Ber (Ziziphus mauritiana)
  - Kusum (Schleichera oleosa) (reported to give the best quality and yield)
- In Thailand the most common host plants are
  - Rain tree (Albizia saman)
  - Pigeon pea (Cajanus cajan)
- In China the common host plants include
  - Pigeon pea (Cajanus cajan)
  - Hibiscus species
- In Mexico
  - Barbados nut (Jatropha curcas)

Estimated yields per tree in India are 6–10 kg for kusum, 1.5–6 kg for ber, and 1–4 kg for dhak. The bugs' life cycles can produce two sticklac yields per year, though it may be better to rest for six months to let the host tree recover.

== Harvesting ==
Lac is harvested by cutting the tree branches that hold sticklac. If dye is being produced, the insects are kept in the sticklac because the dye colour comes from the insects rather than their resin. They may be killed by exposure to the sun. On the other hand, if seedlac or shellac is being produced, most insects can escape because less coloured pale lac is generally more desired.

== Uses ==
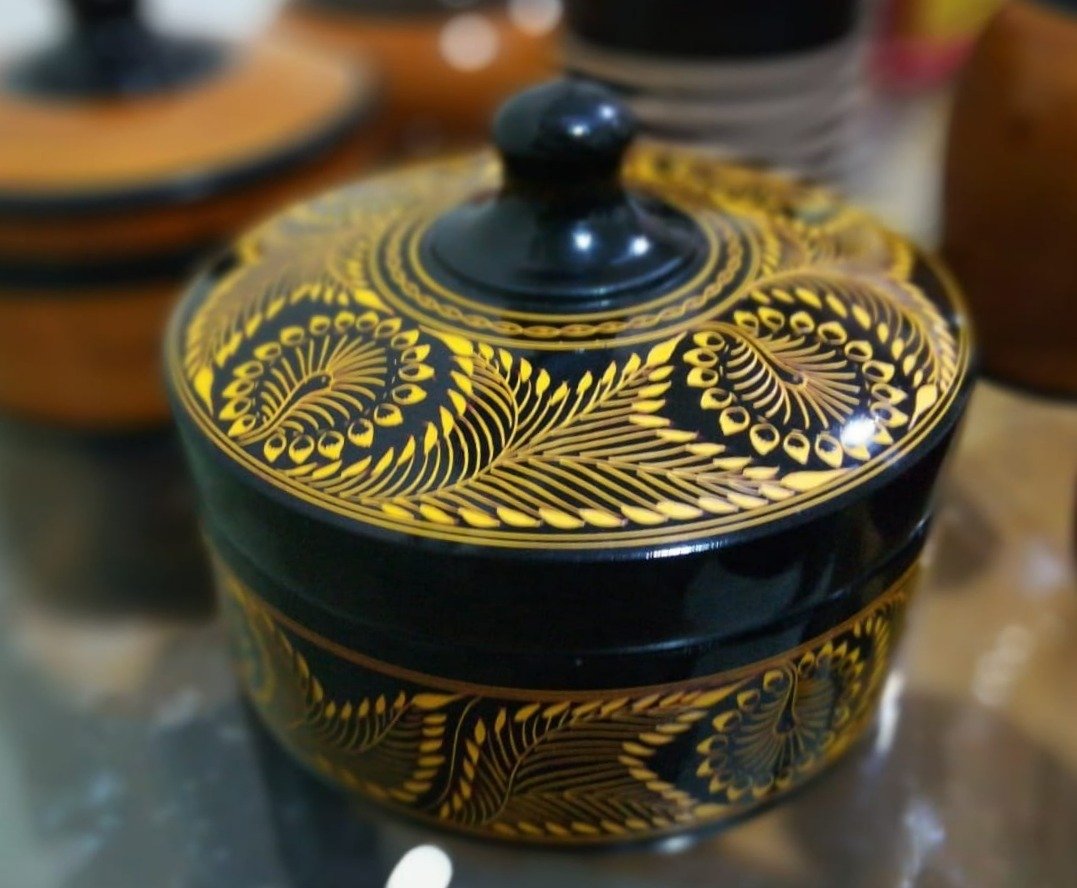
"Laksha" is a traditional form of lacquerware from Sri Lanka which is made from shellac derived from Lac.

The use of lac dye goes back to ancient times. It was used in ancient India and neighbouring areas as wood finish, skin cosmetic, lacquerware and dye for wool and silk. In China, it is a traditional dye for leather goods. Lac for dye has been somewhat replaced by the emergence of synthetic dyes, though it remains in use, and some juices, carbonated drinks, wine, jam, sauce, and candy are coloured using it. It is still used as sealing wax by the India Post but its use is being phased out.

Lac is used in folk medicine as a hepatoprotective and anti-obesity drug. It is used as a varnish for musical instruments such as violins and is soluble in alcohol. This type of lac was used in the finishing of 18th-century fowling guns in the United States.

== Production levels ==
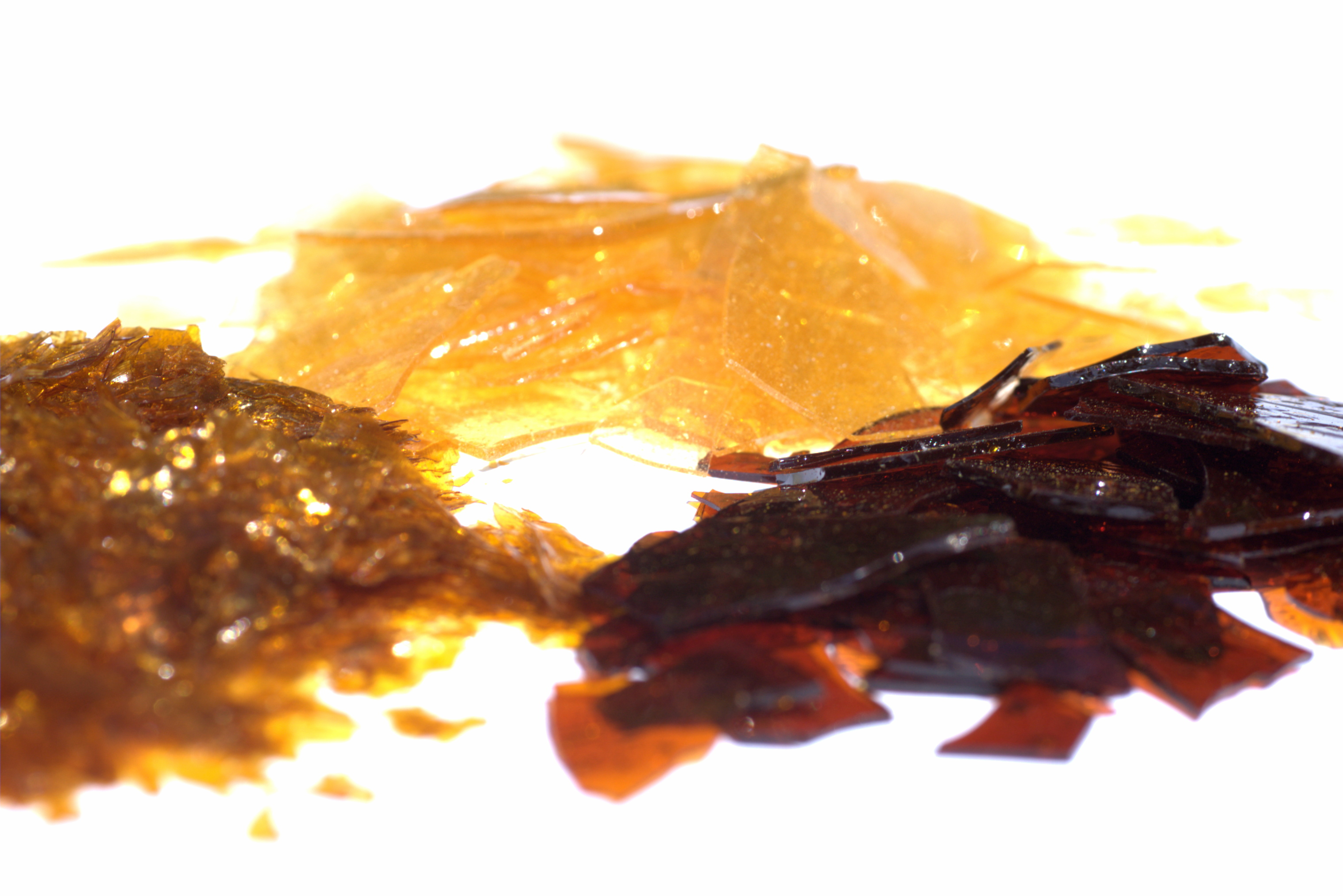
Processed shellac flakes from lac insect resin.

India exported significant amounts of sticklac derivatives, especially lac dye, from the 1700s to the late 1800s. Production declined as synthetic dyes emerged, and after the late 1940s, production of seedlac and shellac also declined due to replacement.

In the mid-1950s, India annually produced about 50,000 tons of sticklac and exported about 29,000 tons of lac; by the late 1980s the figures were about 12,000 tons and 7,000 tons, respectively. By 1992–93, India's lac exports fell further to 4,500 tons. In the same period, Thailand's production increased somewhat, with annual lac exports of around 7,000 tons in the 1990s, mainly of seedlac. China exported only about 500 tons of shellac per year in the 1990s but produced more lac internally: 4,000-5,000 tons of sticklac and 2,000–3,000 tons of shellac in Yunnan province, with additional, smaller production in Fujian province. While India, Thailand, and China are the major lac producers, Bangladesh, Myanmar, Vietnam, and Sri Lanka also play small roles.

== Description in ancient texts ==
Usage of lac/lah/laksha is described in ancient Hindu literature Atharvaveda also. Kand 5 and Sukta 5 (chapter 5, verse 5) is called as Laksha Sukti - verse related to lac. This entire verse is dedicated to lac and its usage. It has description of many ancient practices.

The Mahabharata mentions the Lakshagriha (House of Lac), which was built by the Kauravas to house the Pandavas. The intention of the Kauravas was to burn the Pandavas by setting fire to the Lakshagriha.

== Species ==
- Kerria lacca – the true lac scale
- Paratachardina decorella – the rosette lac scale
- Paratachardina pseudolobata – the lobate lac scale
- Kerria javana

== See also ==
- Carmine (E120) – Another pigment extracted from an insect.
- Lacquer – A product that was at one time made from lac, but in modern common usage now refers to a separate product with similar properties.
- Lake pigment
- Shellac – A protective coating made from lac.
