= Kerria yunnanensis =

Scientific classification
- Kingdom: Animalia
- Phylum: Arthropoda
- Class: Insecta
- Order: Hemiptera
- Suborder: Sternorrhyncha
- Family: Kerriidae
- Genus: Kerria
- Species: K. yunnanensis

Binomial name
- Kerria yunnanensis Ou & Hong, 1990

Species of scale insect

Kerria yunnanensis is a species of scale insect found in China. Eleven different species of ants are known to feed on the honeydew K. yunnanensis produces.
