= Paratachardina lobata =

Scientific classification
- Domain: Eukaryota
- Kingdom: Animalia
- Phylum: Arthropoda
- Class: Insecta
- Order: Hemiptera
- Suborder: Sternorrhyncha
- Family: Kerriidae
- Genus: Paratachardina
- Species: P. lobata

Binomial name
- Paratachardina lobata (Chamberlin)

Species of insect (lobate lac scale)

Paratachardina lobata, the lobate lac scale, is a polyphagous lac scale insect, which damages trees and woody shrubs. It is native to India and Sri Lanka, but has been introduced to Florida where it is regarded as an invasive species.

== Description ==
The adult female insect is up to 2 mm (0.08 in) long and the same wide. The scale that conceals the body has two pairs of prominent lobes, giving the insect an "x"-shape. The scale is glossy, hard and brittle; normally a dark red-brown colour, it is sometimes dull and black due to being coated with sooty mould. The first instar nymphs are oval, dark red and about 0.2 mm (0.01 in) long. It has legs and is the only mobile stage of the insect. The second instar is larger and beginning to show the lobes it will have as an adult. Male lobate lac scales have not been observed in Florida.

== Distribution ==
This scale insect is native to India and Sri Lanka. In 1992 it was recorded in the Bahamas, and in 1999, it was found for the first time in Florida; the hibiscus (Hibiscus rosa-sinensis) in Broward County on which it was feeding was destroyed, but the following year it appeared on Benjamin fig (Ficus benjamina) and on cocoplum (Chrysobalanus icaco), also in Davie, Florida. By 2001, it had been found at eleven locations in Broward County and six in Miami-Dade County, and by late 2002, it had been identified from sites as far north as Homestead, Florida, and from the coast up to 28 km (17 mi) inland.

== Ecology ==
The adult scales cluster on woody twigs and small branches of the host plant, forming bumps and knobs when they are plentiful. On one wax-myrtle (Myrica cerifera), a highly susceptible plant, 42 mature individuals were recorded on a 1 cm (0.4 in) section of twig. They plunge their mouthparts into the host and suck sap. The excess fluid is secreted as honeydew and on this sooty mould grows profusely covering twigs and foliage. Shoots may be stunted and die-back may occur, and in extreme cases the plant may die. Because the adults are immobile, it is the crawler that may disperse the insect to new hosts, the nymphs being carried by the wind or adhering to animals or birds.

In the Indian subcontinent, the lobate lac scale is not a significant pest, presumably because it has natural enemies that keep it under control, however in Florida this is not the case. Researchers in India have identified four chalcidoid wasps that parasitize the scale insects, and these are being studied to see whether any would be suitable to act in biological pest control.
