= James Kerr (surgeon) =

Scottish surgeon and naturalist

James Kerr (1 August 1737 – 17 September 1782) was a Scottish surgeon and naturalist who worked under the East India Company service in India. While in India, he described several species of plants and described the insect that produces lac resulting in the genus Kerria named after him.

Kerr was born in Beith, Ayrshire to James Kerr (1693–1747) and Janet Blackburn (1693–c.1765). His father, laird of a Crummock estate was a Jacobite and was imprisoned, dying in Dumbarton Castle. He studied medicine at the University of Glasgow where his teachers included William Cullen and John Hope. After joining the East India Company as a surgeon he served aboard the East Indiaman Cruttenden. He was appointed to the Bengal medical service on 16 May 1770 and served in Patna which gave him the epithet "James Kerr of Patna" in literary references. In 1773 he corresponded with Cullen on the plants of India. In 1774 he was encouraged by the government to conduct studies and make enquiries on plants and natural products of medical and economic value. In 1777 he was also appointed opium inspector at Patna and he sought to grow pan and produce toddy for arrack production. He hired Indian artists to produce illustrations of plants. Among the plant illustrations that Kerr sent to Cullen was that of burrum chundalli, a curiosity known for its rapid movements, which was later given the name Hedysarum by Hugo Arnot. A set of the seeds of the same plant was sent in 1775 to London by Lady Anne Monson née Vane (1726–1776) who was married to Colonel George Monson. The plant is now known as Codariocalyx motorius. In 1779 he applied for the post of surgeon of Dacca following the death of Peter Smith. In 1781 he described the insect from which lac was produced. He gave it the name Coccus lacca. It was later placed in the genus Kerria named after him. With the assistance of his munshī, Kerr produced a manuscript translation from Persian which was titled A Short Historical Narrative of the Mahrattah State (1782) that is held at Glasgow. Kerr also wrote a proposal to the East India Company suggesting that they control the opium trade in his manuscript Observations on Opium. Kerr was a friend of Patrick Russell who also joined the East India Company medical service. When Russell reached India, he noted that Kerr had died.

Kerr may have been involved in some private trade in Indian textiles. He married an Indian woman named Margaret Ina with whom he had two children. He died in Calcutta and is buried in the South Park Cemetery (the grave has however been lost and was next to that of Lady Anne). A manuscript in the New York Botanical Garden titled Diarium Plantarum Bengaliae has been identified as being by Kerr. It includes the records of the birth of his children James (born 19 November 1774) and Robert (born 22 December 1776). Kerr's bequest and materials were taken to Joseph Banks by the wife of Major James Grant. This included natural history drawings made by Indians that Kerr had employed.
