= Aleuritic acid =

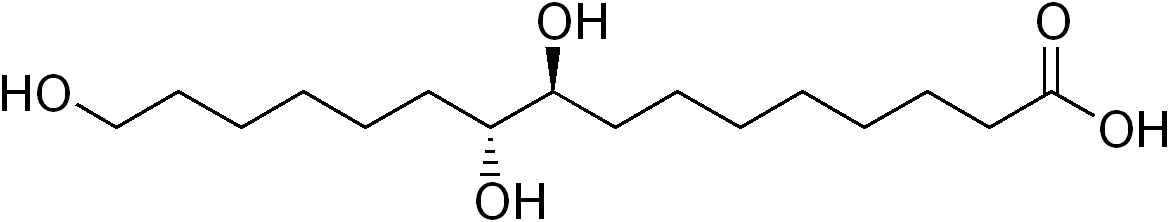

Names
- Preferred IUPAC name rel-(9R,10S)-9,10,16-Trihydroxyhexadecanoic acid
- Other names Aleuritolic acid

Identifiers
CAS Number	533-87-9
3D model (JSmol)	Interactive image
ChemSpider	5602481
ECHA InfoCard	100.007.800
PubChem CID	222178
UNII	442LQ2K03A
CompTox Dashboard (EPA)	DTXSID10878090
- InChI: InChI=1S/C16H32O5/c17-13-9-5-4-7-11-15(19)14(18)10-6-2-1-3-8-12-16(20)21/h14-15,17-19H,1-13H2,(H,20,21)/t14-,15+/m0/s1 Key: MEHUJCGAYMDLEL-LSDHHAIUSA-N; InChI=1/C16H32O5/c17-13-9-5-4-7-11-15(19)14(18)10-6-2-1-3-8-12-16(20)21/h14-15,17-19H,1-13H2,(H,20,21)/t14-,15+/m0/s1 Key: MEHUJCGAYMDLEL-LSDHHAIUBJ
- SMILES: O=C(O)CCCCCCC[C@H](O)[C@H](O)CCCCCCO

Properties
Chemical formula	C_{16}H_{32}O_{5}
Molar mass	304.43 g/mol
- Except where otherwise noted, data are given for materials in their standard state (at 25 °C [77 °F], 100 kPa). verify (what is ?) Infobox references

Aleuritic acid, or α-aleuritic acid, is a major ingredient in shellac, constituting about 35% of it. It is used as a starting material in the perfume industry for the preparation of musk aroma.
