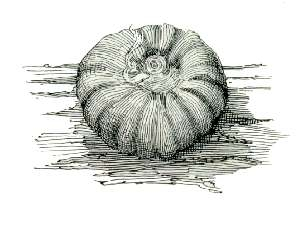

Scientific classification
- Domain: Eukaryota
- Kingdom: Animalia
- Phylum: Arthropoda
- Class: Insecta
- Order: Hemiptera
- Suborder: Sternorrhyncha
- Family: Kerriidae
- Genus: Paratachardina
- Species: P. decorella

Binomial name
- Paratachardina decorella (Maskell, 1893)

= Paratachardina decorella =

Species of true bug

Paratachardina decorella, the rosette lac scale, is a scale insect in the Kerriidae family.
