= Kerria (insect) =

Scientific classification
- Domain: Eukaryota
- Kingdom: Animalia
- Phylum: Arthropoda
- Class: Insecta
- Order: Hemiptera
- Suborder: Sternorrhyncha
- Family: Kerriidae
- Genus: Kerria; Targioni Tozzetti, 1884

Species
- See text

Genus of true bugs

Kerria is a genus of scale insect of the family Kerriidae. The species are found throughout southeast Asia, India and southern China.

== Species list ==
Subgenus Kerria (Chamberliniella)

- K. greeni
- K. javana
- K. meridionalis
- K. rangoonensis

Subgenus Kerria (Kerria)

- K. albizziae
- K. brancheata
- K. chamberlini
- K. chinensis
- K. communis
- K. ebrachiata
- K. fici
- K. indicola
- K. lacca
- K. mengdingensis
- K. nagoliensis
- K. nepalensis
- K. pusana
- K. ruralis
- K. sharda
- K. sindica
- K. yunnanensis
