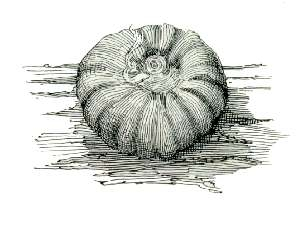
- rosette lac scale (Paratachardina decorella)

Scientific classification
- Kingdom: Animalia
- Phylum: Arthropoda
- Class: Insecta
- Order: Hemiptera
- Suborder: Sternorrhyncha
- Superfamily: Coccoidea
- Family: Kerriidae; Lindinger, 1937

Synonyms
- Kerridae

= Kerriidae =

Family of true bugs

Kerriidae is a family of scale insects, commonly known as lac insects or lac scales, erected by Karl Lindinger in 1937.

Some members of the genera Metatachardia, Tachardiella, Austrotacharidia, Afrotachardina, Tachardina, and Kerria are raised for commercial purposes, though the most commonly cultivated species is Kerria lacca. These insects secrete a waxy resin that is harvested and converted commercially into lac and shellac, used in various dyes, cosmetics, food glazes, wood finishing varnishes and polishes.

Commercially-used species include:

- Kerria lacca – true lac scale
- Paratachardina decorella – rosette lac scale
- Paratachardina pseudolobata – lobate lac scale

== Genera ==
The Global Biodiversity Information Facility lists:

1. Afrotachardina Chamberlin, 1923
2. Albotachardina Zhang, 1992
3. Austrotachardia Chamberlin, 1923
4. Austrotachardiella Chamberlin, 1923
5. Kerria Targioni-Tozzetti, 1884 - type genus
6. Laccifer Oken, 1815
7. Metatachardia Chamberlin, 1923
8. Paratachardina Balachowsky, 1950
9. Tachardia Blanchard, 1886
10. Tachardiella Cockerell, 1901
11. Tachardina Cockerell, 1901

== See also ==
- Shellac
- Lac (resin)
