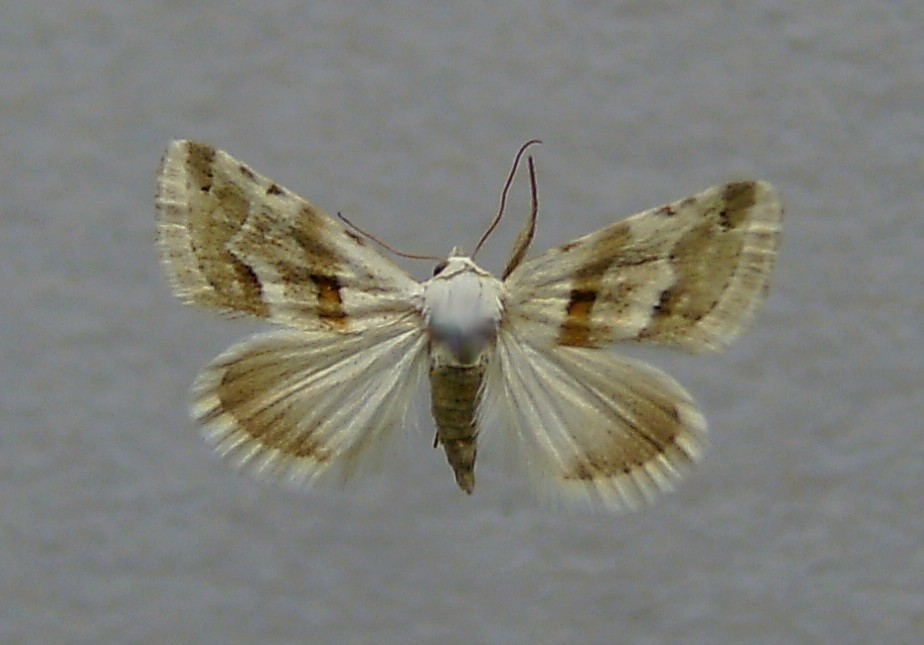

Scientific classification
- Kingdom: Animalia
- Phylum: Arthropoda
- Clade: Pancrustacea
- Class: Insecta
- Order: Lepidoptera
- Superfamily: Noctuoidea
- Family: Erebidae
- Genus: Eublemma
- Species: E. minutata

Binomial name
- Eublemma minutata (Fabricius, 1794)

Synonyms
- Thalpochares paula; Porphyrinia noctualis

= Eublemma minutata =

Scarce marbled

Species of moth

Eublemma minutata, the scarce marbled, is a species of moth of the family Erebidae. It can be found everywhere in Europe, except for Luxembourg, the Netherlands, the northern part of Russia and various islands. In Asia, it can be found only in Lebanon.

The wingspan is 13–15 millimetres (0.51–0.59 in). Meyrick describes it thus Head and thorax white. Forewings ochreous-white, suffused with light grey except towards base and along costa; median shade straight, ochreous-grey; second line straight, whitish, with a small angular median projection, posteriorly edged with ochreous-grey suffusion; subterminal obscurely whitish, followed by a darker grey costal spot. Hindwings fuscous-whitish, becoming fuscous posteriorly.

The moths are active day and night and fly in July and August. They occasionally visit the flowers of Helichrysum arenarium or fly short distances in the sunshine. At night they appear to artificial light sources, even occasionally to baits. The caterpillars live from May to June on Helichrysum arenarium and feed preferably on their flowers, shoot tips and fruit stalks. They like to hide in a whitish web below the flower head.
