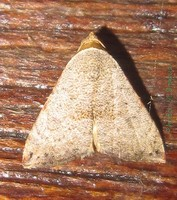

Scientific classification
- Domain: Eukaryota
- Kingdom: Animalia
- Phylum: Arthropoda
- Class: Insecta
- Order: Lepidoptera
- Superfamily: Noctuoidea
- Family: Erebidae
- Genus: Eublemma
- Species: E. viettei

Binomial name
- Eublemma viettei (Berio, 1954)

Synonyms
- Porphyrinia viettei Berio, 1954

= Eublemma viettei =

Species of moth

Eublemma viettei is a species of moth of the family Erebidae. It is found in Ethiopia, Madagascar, Mauritius, Zimbabwe and in Réunion.

Its length is about 7–8 mm, with a wingspan of approx. 14–16 mm.
