= Eublemma recta =

Straight-lined seed moth

Scientific classification
- Kingdom: Animalia
- Phylum: Arthropoda
- Class: Insecta
- Order: Lepidoptera
- Superfamily: Noctuoidea
- Family: Erebidae
- Genus: Eublemma
- Species: E. recta

Binomial name
- Eublemma recta (Guenée, 1852)

Synonyms
- Micra recta Guenée, 1852; Eublemma rectum; Phalaena obiqualis Fabricius, 1794 (preocc.); Anthophila flammicincta Walker, 1865; Trothisa pallescens Herrich-Schäffer, 1868; Micra stalii Wallengren, 1871; Tarache patula Morrison, 1875; Tarache patruelis Grote, 1876; Eublemma brunneoochracea Strand, 1917; Eublemma luteipennis Strand, 1917

Species of moth

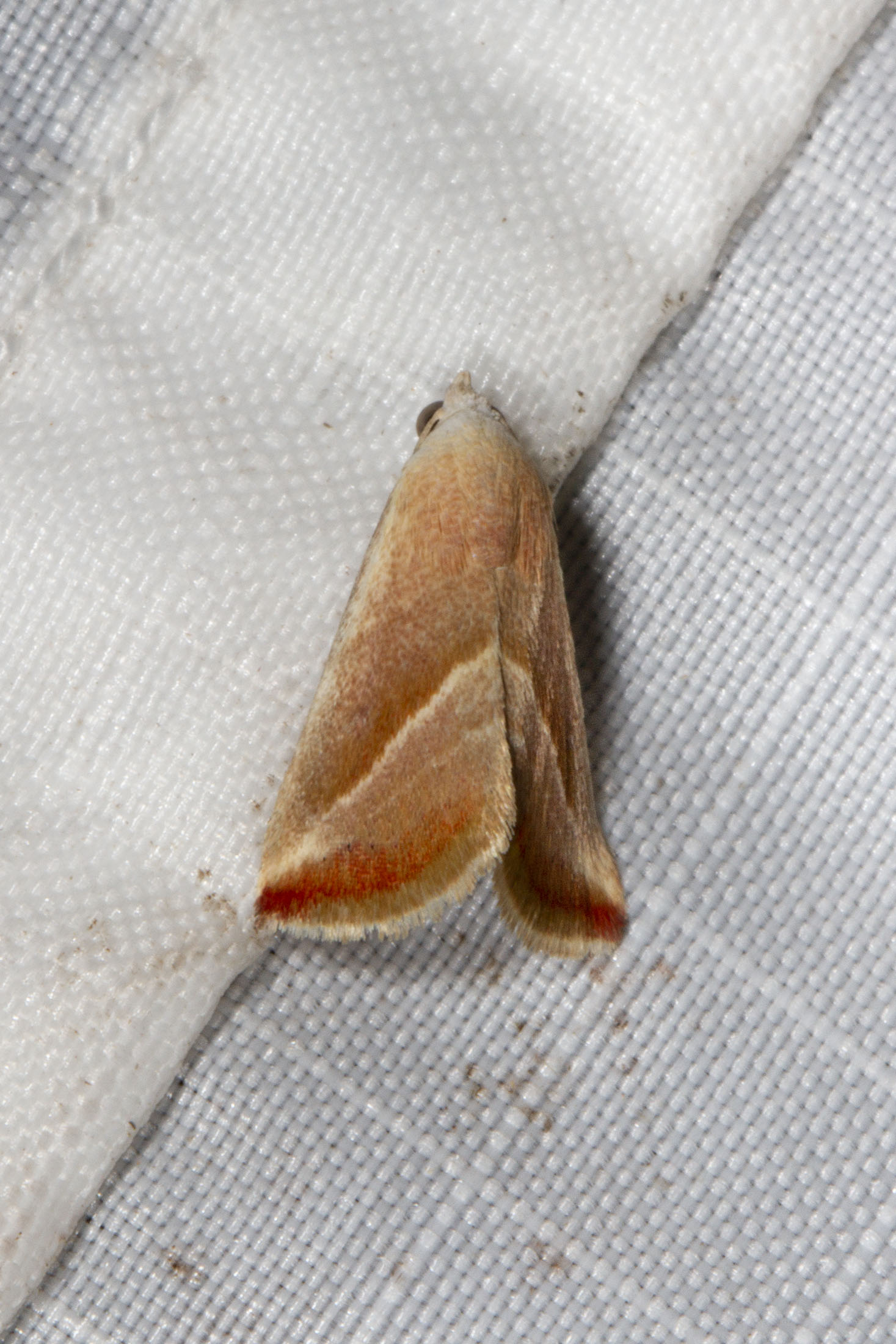

Eublemma recta, the straight-lined seed moth, is a moth of the family Erebidae. The species was first described by Achille Guenée in 1852. It is found in the United States from South Carolina to Florida and west to Texas. It is also found south to Argentina, on Cuba, Jamaica and Puerto Rico.

The wingspan is 16–19 millimetres (0.63–0.75 in).

The larvae feed on various plants in the family Convolvulaceae, including Ipomoea and Convolvulus species.
