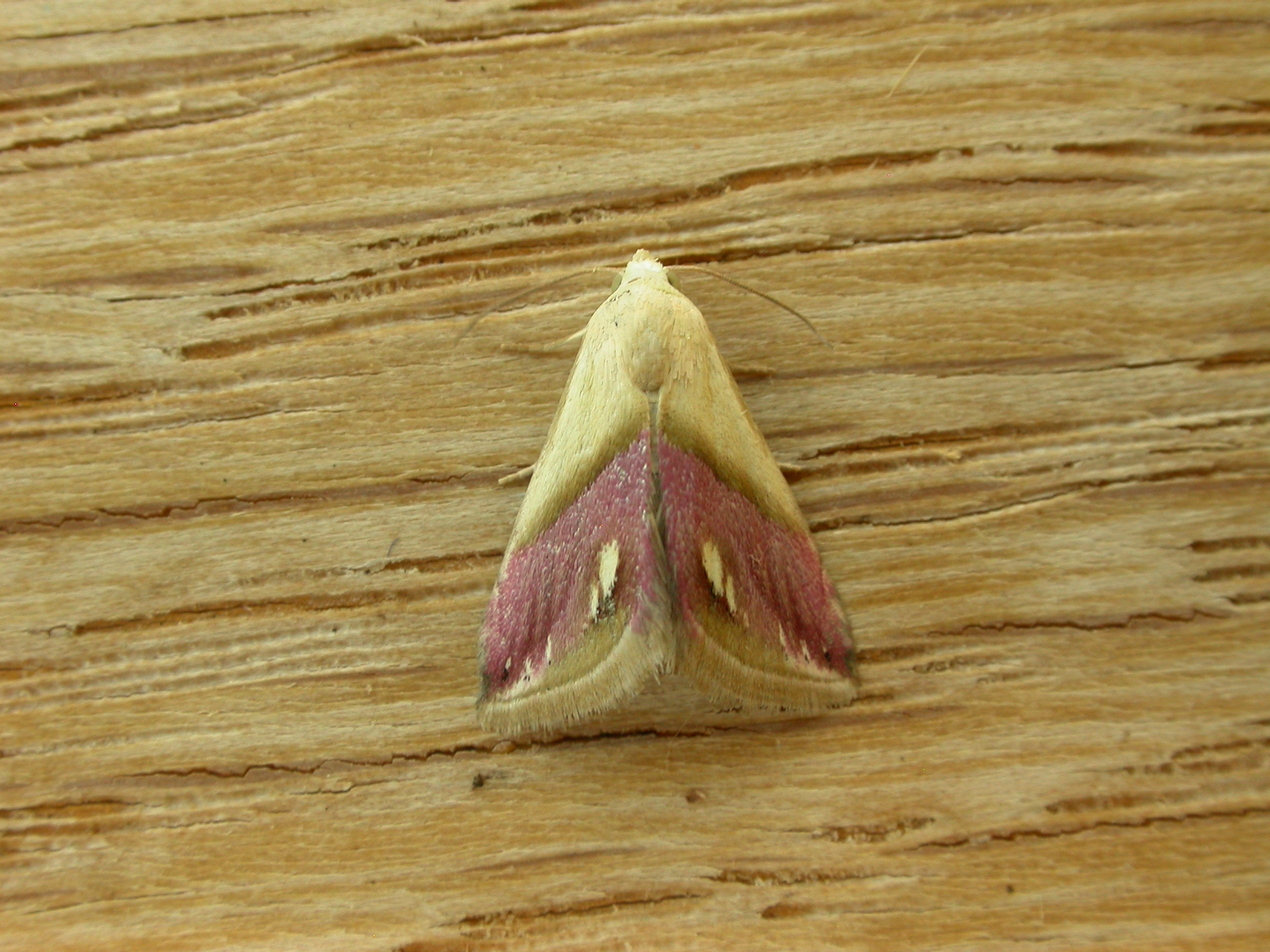

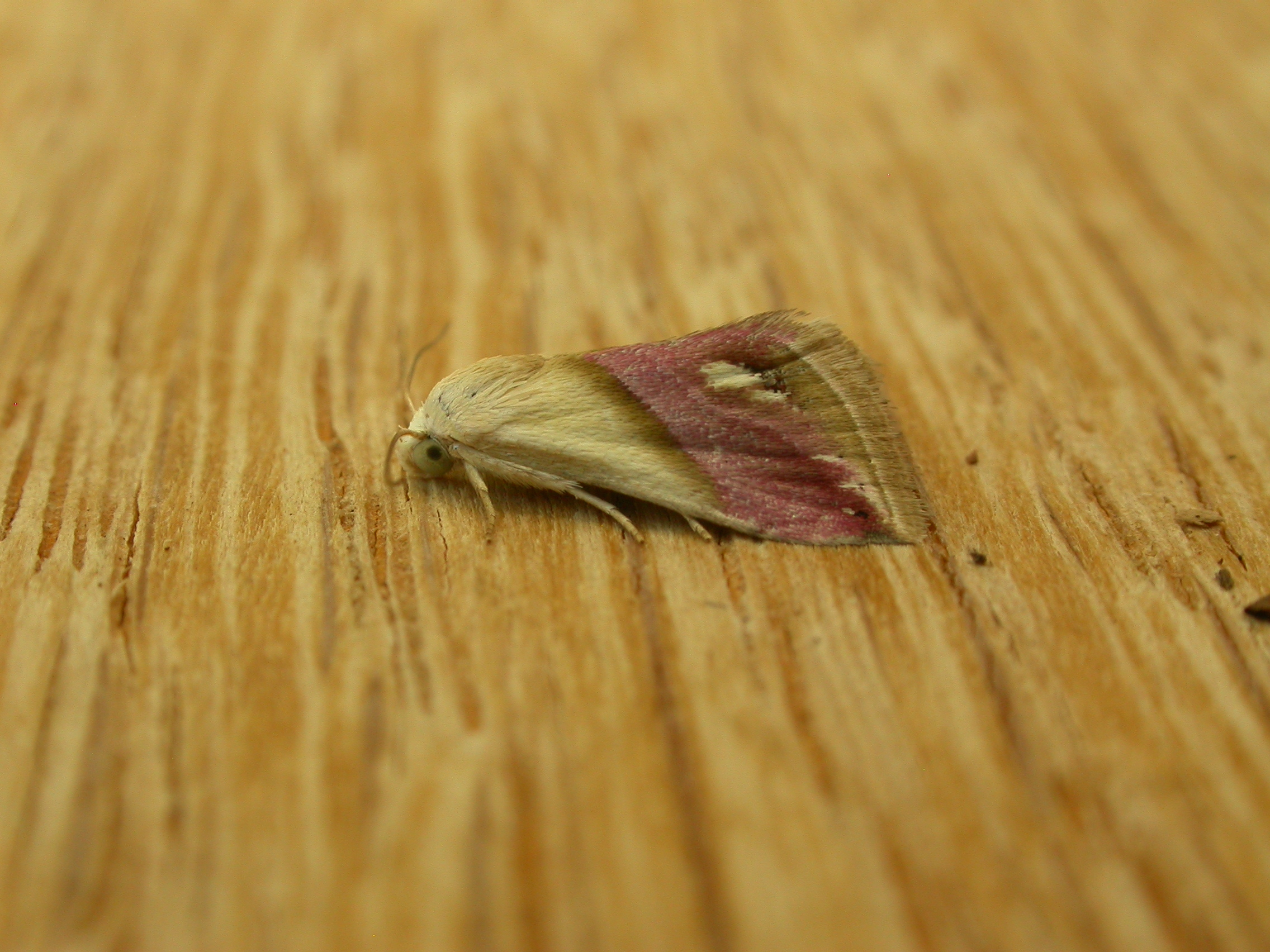

Scientific classification
- Domain: Eukaryota
- Kingdom: Animalia
- Phylum: Arthropoda
- Class: Insecta
- Order: Lepidoptera
- Superfamily: Noctuoidea
- Family: Erebidae
- Genus: Eublemma
- Species: E. cochylioides

Binomial name
- Eublemma cochylioides (Guenée, 1852)

Synonyms
- Micra cochylioides Guenée, 1852; Micra rosita Guenée, 1852; Thalpochares phoenissa Lederer, 1855; Micra derogata Walker, 1858; Thalpochares calida Staudinger, 1894; Porphyrinia confuscata Warren, 1913

= Eublemma cochylioides =

Species of moth

Eublemma cochylioides, the pink-barred eublemma, is a species of moth of the family Erebidae described by Achille Guenée in 1852.

== Distribution ==
It is found throughout the Old World countries (including France). Besides France, it can also be found in such European countries as Greece and Portugal, and on islands such as Crete and Cyprus. It is also common in Asian ones such as Hong Kong, India, Sri Lanka, Japan, and Taiwan, where it might migrate. When comes African migration the species resort to South Africa, from which it might migrate to such Australian islands as Fiji and Tonga, and including Queensland, New South Wales, and Western Australia.

== Description ==
The wingspan is about 20 millimetres (0.79 in). Male with no pit in the membrane of forewing towards apex, which is somewhat acute. Head and thorax ochreous white. Forewings with ochreous-white basal area, bounded by a very oblique fulvous line, beyond which the area is bright pink. Outer margin fulvous suffused. Two white spots can be seen near outer angle, with some black scaled on their outer edge. Hindwings pale, suffused with fuscous towards outer margin.

The larvae have been recorded on Elephantopus species and Prenanthes spinosa.
