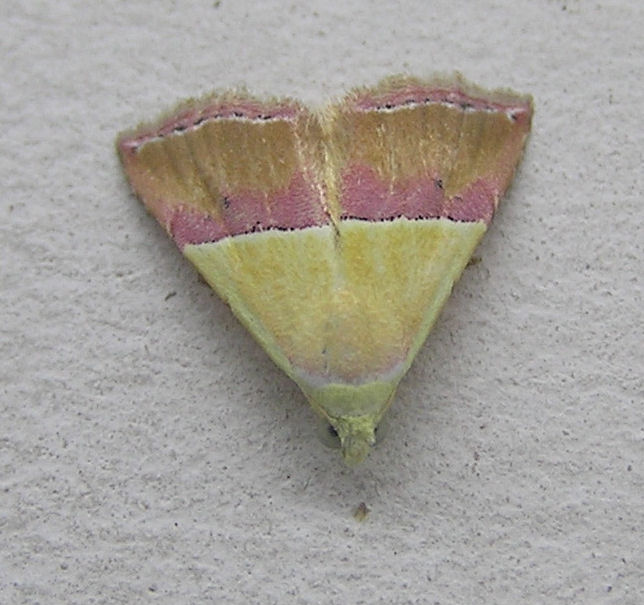

Scientific classification
- Kingdom: Animalia
- Phylum: Arthropoda
- Class: Insecta
- Order: Lepidoptera
- Superfamily: Noctuoidea
- Family: Erebidae
- Genus: Eublemma
- Species: E. anachoresis

Binomial name
- Eublemma anachoresis (Wallengren, 1863)

Synonyms
- Xanthoptera anachoresis Wallengren, 1863; Thalpochares accedens Felder & Rogenhofer, 1874; Eublemma accedens; Thalpochares divisa Moore, 1881; Thalpochares leonata Butler, 1886; Porphyrinia derufata Warren, 1913

= Eublemma anachoresis =

Banner

Species of moth

Eublemma anachoresis, the banner, is a moth of the family Erebidae. The species was first described by Hans Daniel Johan Wallengren in 1863. It is found in the Indomalayan realm, Australia and the southern part of Africa. Records include Fiji, Hong Kong, India, Sri Lanka, Japan, the Society Islands, Eswatini, Taiwan, Thailand and northern New South Wales and Queensland in Australia.

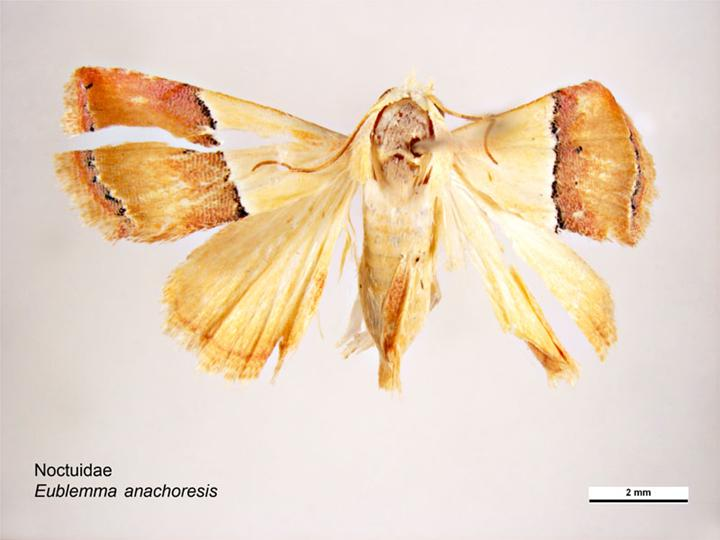
Dorsal view

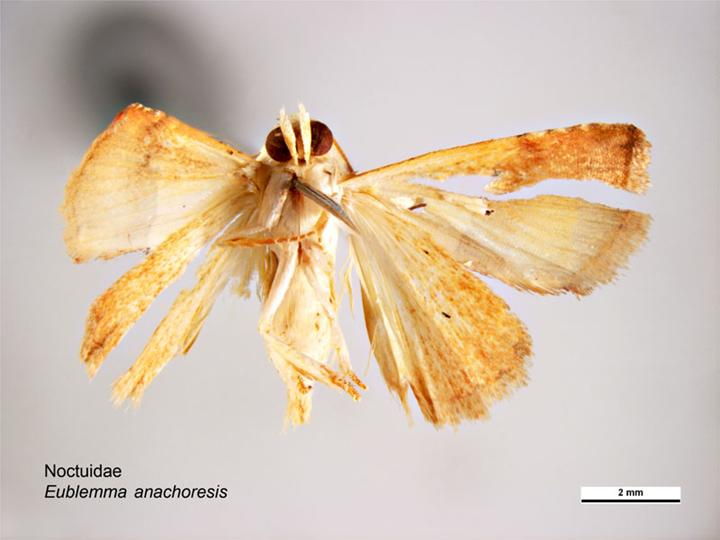
Ventral view

== Description ==
The wingspan is about 22–24 mm. Head, thorax and abdomen pale bright yellow, with slightly pinkish tinge in thorax. Forewings with yellow basal half, bounded by a slightly oblique white and black line, beyond which the area is bright pinkish with a slight copper tinge. There is an indistinct slightly sinuous sub-marginal line. Hindwings are yellowish. African forms has a pure white sub-marginal line in forewings.

The larvae feed on Oryza sativa, Waltheria americana, and Waltheria indica.
