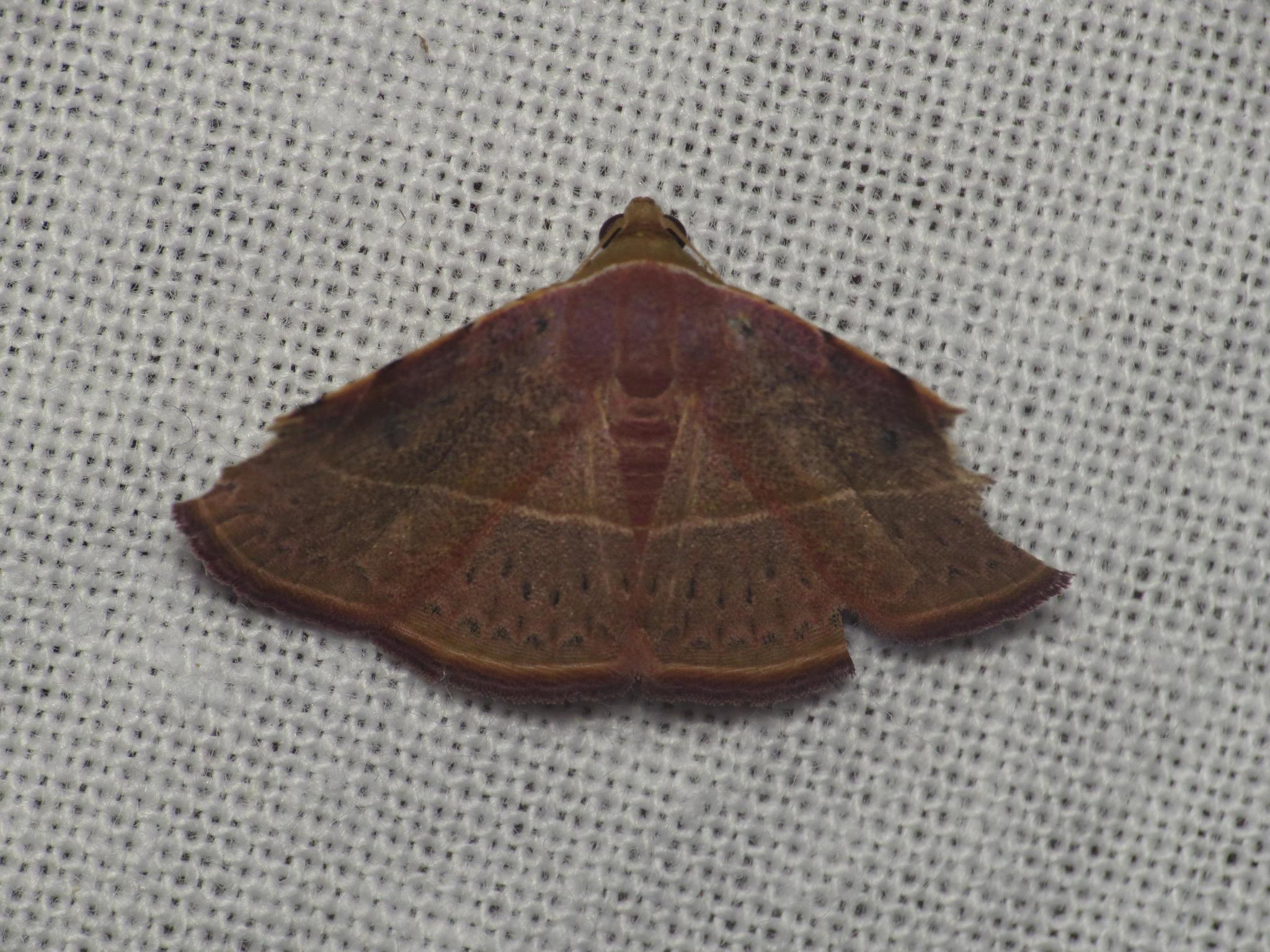

Scientific classification
- Kingdom: Animalia
- Phylum: Arthropoda
- Class: Insecta
- Order: Lepidoptera
- Superfamily: Noctuoidea
- Family: Erebidae
- Genus: Eublemma
- Species: E. latericolor

Binomial name
- Eublemma latericolor Turner, 1945

= Eublemma latericolor =

Species of moth

Eublemma latericolor is a species of moth in the family Erebidae. The species was originally described by Alfred Jefferis Turner in 1945.

== Description ==
Eublemma latericolor is 20–22 mm (0.79–0.87 in) in length. Head, thorax, and abdomen are reddish-grey, while extremities and antennae are pale grey. The forewings have a triangular shape, the hindwings are rounded; both are finely patterned.

== Range ==
Observations of Eublemma latericolor have been documented in the north of Queensland in 1945. Recent crowdsourced observations confirmed that this moth species can be observed there
