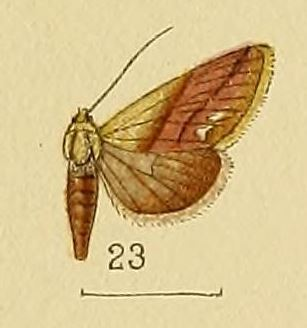

Scientific classification
- Domain: Eukaryota
- Kingdom: Animalia
- Phylum: Arthropoda
- Class: Insecta
- Order: Lepidoptera
- Superfamily: Noctuoidea
- Family: Erebidae
- Genus: Eublemma
- Species: E. acarodes

Binomial name
- Eublemma acarodes C. Swinhoe, 1907

= Eublemma acarodes =

Species of moth

Eublemma acarodes is a species of moth of the family Erebidae first described by Charles Swinhoe in 1907. It is found in Angola, Madagascar, Tanzania and Zimbabwe.
