= Eublemma rosea =

Scientific classification
- Kingdom: Animalia
- Phylum: Arthropoda
- Class: Insecta
- Order: Lepidoptera
- Superfamily: Noctuoidea
- Family: Erebidae
- Genus: Eublemma
- Species: E. rosea

Binomial name
- Eublemma rosea (Hübner, 1790)

Species of moth

Eublemma rosea is a species of moth in the genus Erebidae. The species was first described in 1790 by Jacob Hübner.

The species is found in Europe.
