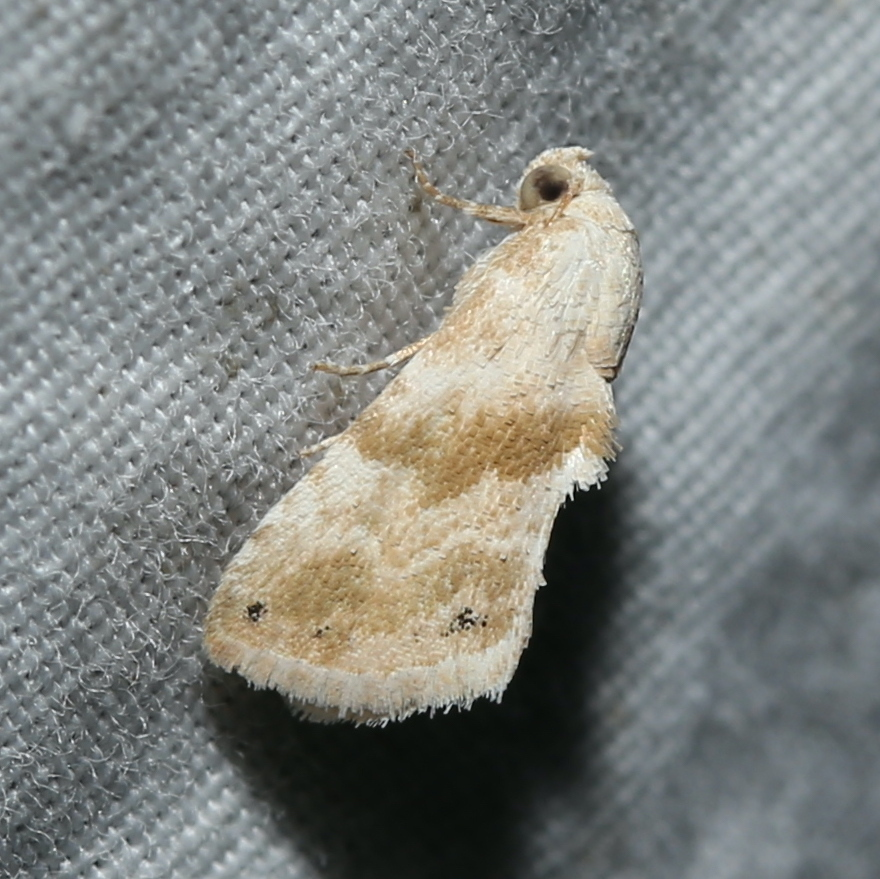

Scientific classification
- Kingdom: Animalia
- Phylum: Arthropoda
- Class: Insecta
- Order: Lepidoptera
- Superfamily: Noctuoidea
- Family: Erebidae
- Genus: Eublemma
- Species: E. minima

Binomial name
- Eublemma minima (Guenée, 1852)

Synonyms
- Micra minima Guenée, 1852; Thalpochares carmelita Morrison, 1875; Toxophleps pallida Toxophleps pallida; Thalpochares pennula Felder & Rogenhofer, 1874

= Eublemma minima =

Everlasting bud moth

Species of moth

Eublemma minima, the everlasting bud moth, is a moth of the family Erebidae. The species was first described by Achille Guenée in 1852. It is found in Kenya, Madagascar, South Africa and Yemen, as well as in the United States, Brazil, Argentina, Caribbean and Paraguay.
