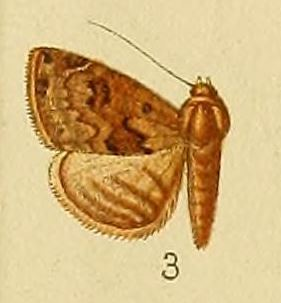
- Eublemma nigrivitta

Scientific classification
- Kingdom: Animalia
- Phylum: Arthropoda
- Class: Insecta
- Order: Lepidoptera
- Superfamily: Noctuoidea
- Family: Erebidae
- Genus: Eublemma
- Species: E. nigrivitta

Binomial name
- Eublemma nigrivitta Hampson, 1902

= Eublemma nigrivitta =

Species of moth

Eublemma nigrivitta is a species of moth of the family Erebidae. It is found in Somalia and South Africa.
