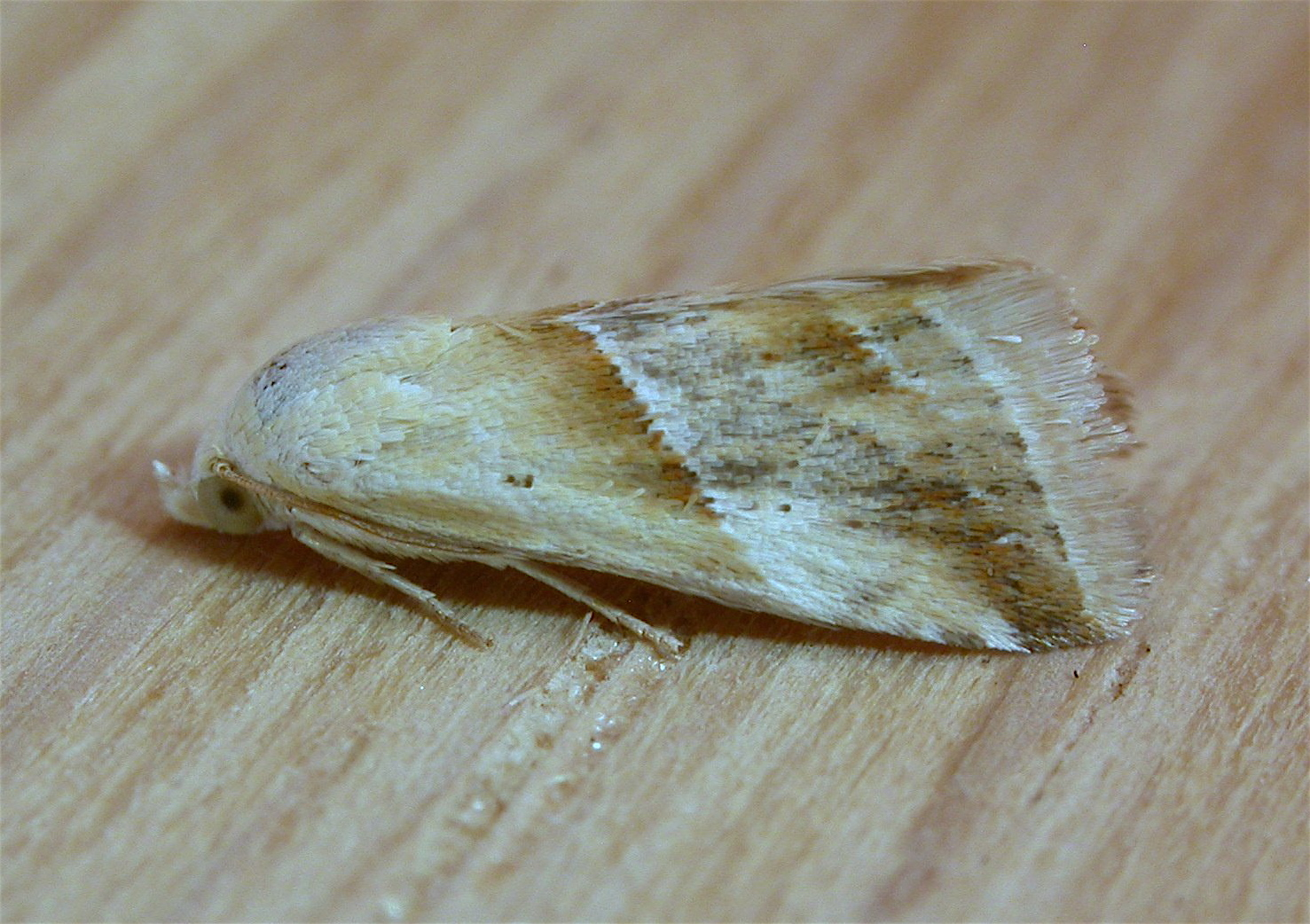

Scientific classification
- Domain: Eukaryota
- Kingdom: Animalia
- Phylum: Arthropoda
- Class: Insecta
- Order: Lepidoptera
- Superfamily: Noctuoidea
- Family: Erebidae
- Genus: Eublemma
- Species: E. rivula

Binomial name
- Eublemma rivula Moore, 1882

Synonyms
- Porphyrinia pallida

= Eublemma rivula =

Species of moth

Eublemma rivula is a species of moth of the family Erebidae first described by Frederic Moore in 1882. It is found in most of southeast Asia, including Hong Kong, India, Japan, the Society Islands, Taiwan and in Australia in the Australian Capital Territory, New South Wales and Queensland.

The larvae mainly feed on Carthamus tinctorius (safflower).
