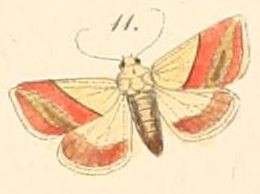

Scientific classification
- Kingdom: Animalia
- Phylum: Arthropoda
- Clade: Pancrustacea
- Class: Insecta
- Order: Lepidoptera
- Superfamily: Noctuoidea
- Family: Erebidae
- Genus: Eublemma
- Species: E. dimidialis

Binomial name
- Eublemma dimidialis (Fabricius, 1794)

Synonyms
- Phalaea dimidialis Fabricius, 1794; Anthophila secta Guenée, 1852; Micra hemirhoda Walker, 1865; Anthophila roseifascia Walker, 1865; Thalpochares adulans Felder & Rogenhofer, 1874; Thalpochares basilissa Meyrick, 1891

= Eublemma dimidialis =

Species of moth

Eublemma dimidialis is a species of moth of the family Erebidae first described by Johan Christian Fabricius in 1794. It is found in Indonesia, Pakistan, China, Micronesia, Nepal, Indochina, India, Japan, Sri Lanka, Taiwan, New Guinea and Australia.

== Description ==
Its wingspan is about 22 mm. Body bright ochreous yellow. Forewings with the outer half length is bright rose pink, bounded inwardly by an oblique white line. A sub-marginal ochreous band not reaching the costa. Cilia whitish at extremities. Hindwings ochreous, fuscous towards outer margin, with patches of pink on vein 1 and at anal angle.

== Ecology ==
Known food plants of the larvae are Fabaceae, such as mung beans (Vigna radiata) and cow peas (Vigna unguiculata).
