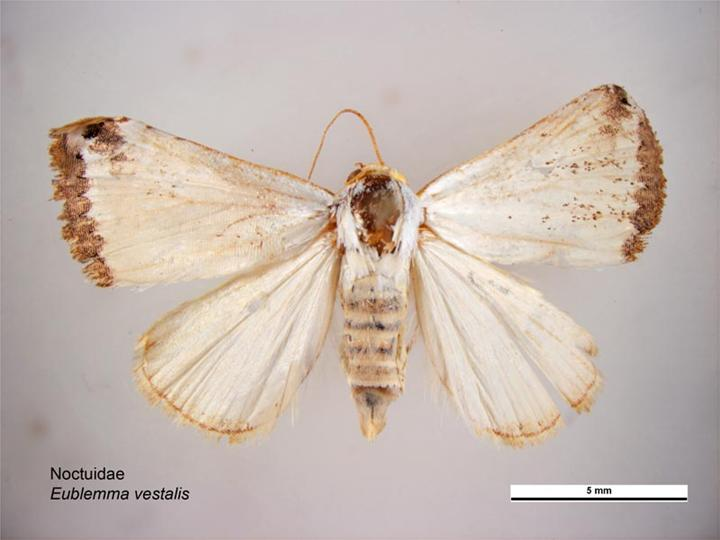
- Dorsal view
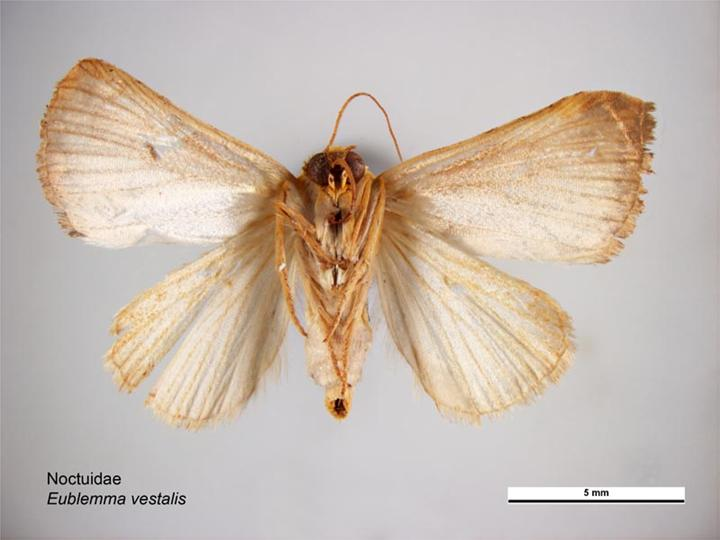
- Ventral view

Scientific classification
- Domain: Eukaryota
- Kingdom: Animalia
- Phylum: Arthropoda
- Class: Insecta
- Order: Lepidoptera
- Superfamily: Noctuoidea
- Family: Erebidae
- Genus: Eublemma
- Species: E. vestalis

Binomial name
- Eublemma vestalis (Butler, 1886)

Synonyms
- Anthophila vestalis Butler, 1886

= Eublemma vestalis =

Species of moth

Eublemma vestalis is a species of moth of the family Erebidae first described by Arthur Gardiner Butler in 1886. It is found in Queensland in Australia.
