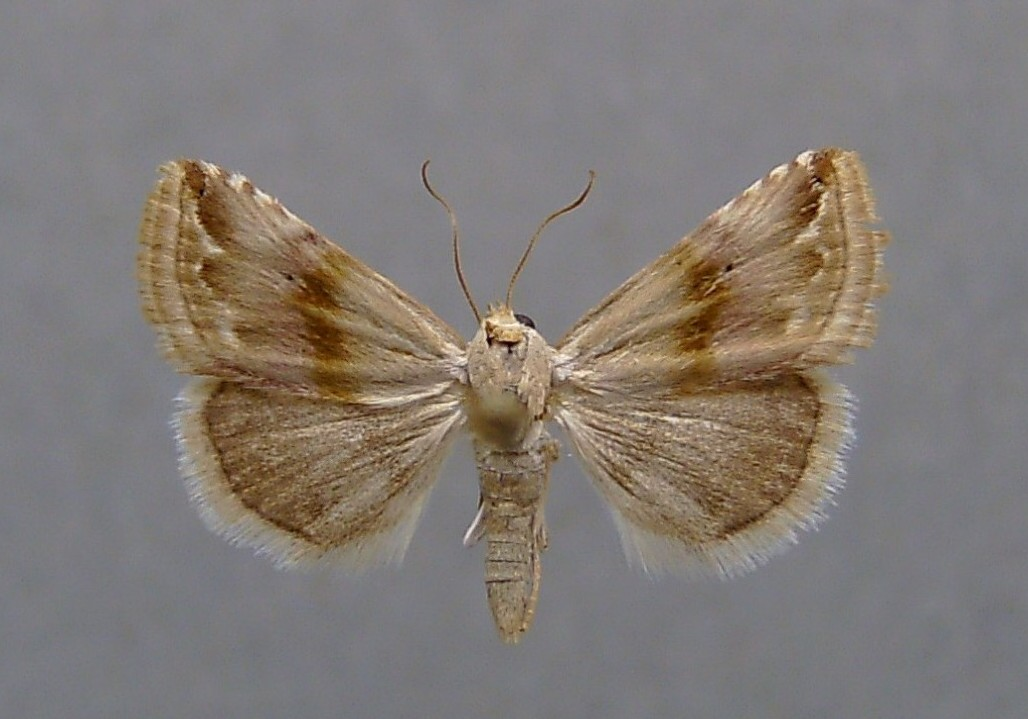
- Mounted
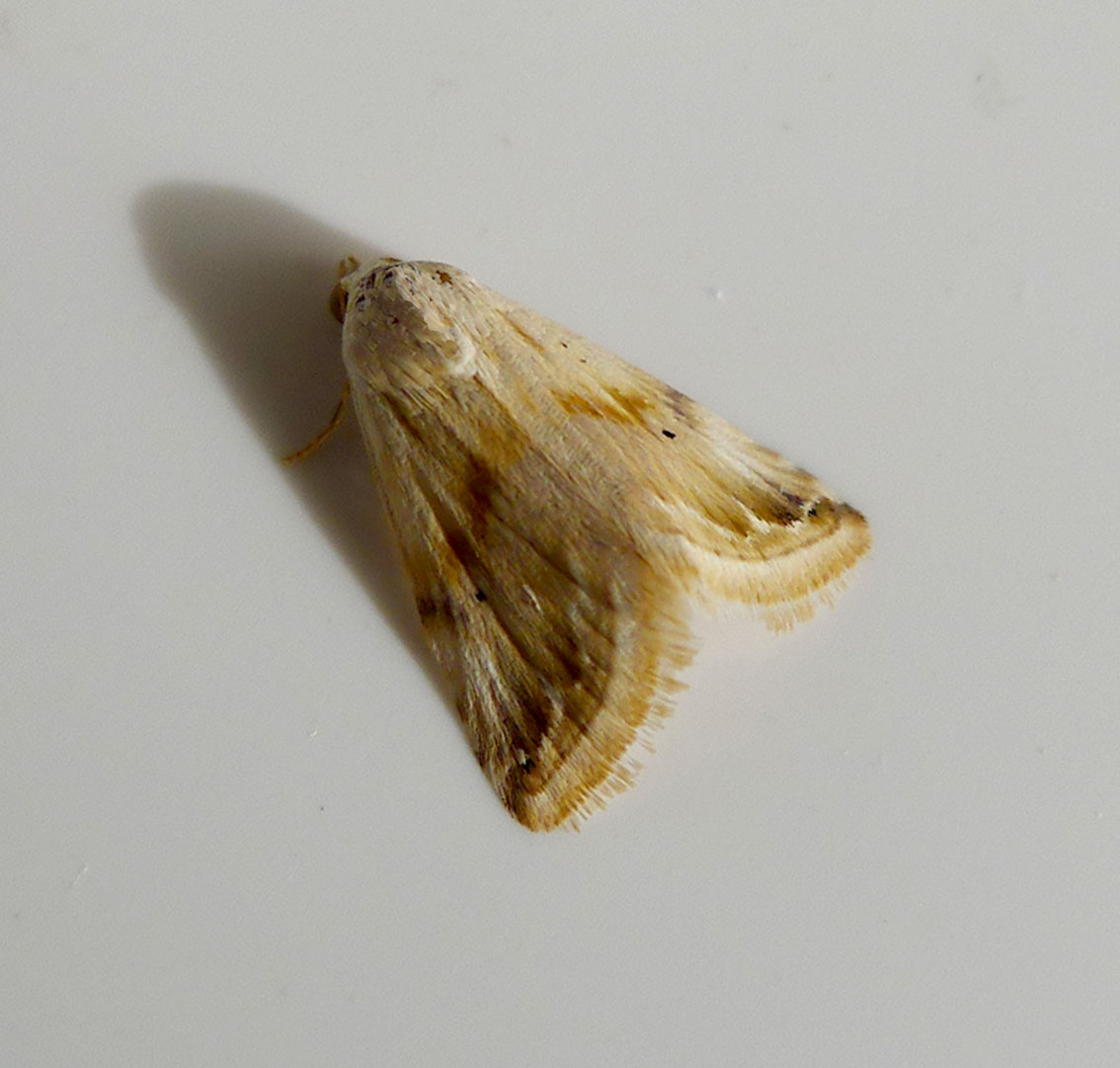

Scientific classification
- Domain: Eukaryota
- Kingdom: Animalia
- Phylum: Arthropoda
- Class: Insecta
- Order: Lepidoptera
- Superfamily: Noctuoidea
- Family: Erebidae
- Genus: Eublemma
- Species: E. ostrina

Binomial name
- Eublemma ostrina (Hübner, 1808)

Synonyms
- Noctua ostrina Hübner, [1808]; Erastria ostrina; Anthophila porphyrina Freyer, 1845; Anthophila numida Lucas, 1849; Micra carthami Herrich-Schäffer, [1851]; Micra ostrina var. aestivalis Guenée, 1852; Eublemma ostrina thasia Koutsaftikis, 1973

= Eublemma ostrina =

Purple marbled

Species of moth

Eublemma ostrina, the purple marbled, is a moth of the family Erebidae. The species was first described by Jacob Hübner in 1808. It is mainly found in central and southern Europe, and further east, but is also a scarce migrant in the United Kingdom, where it is mainly found along the south coast.

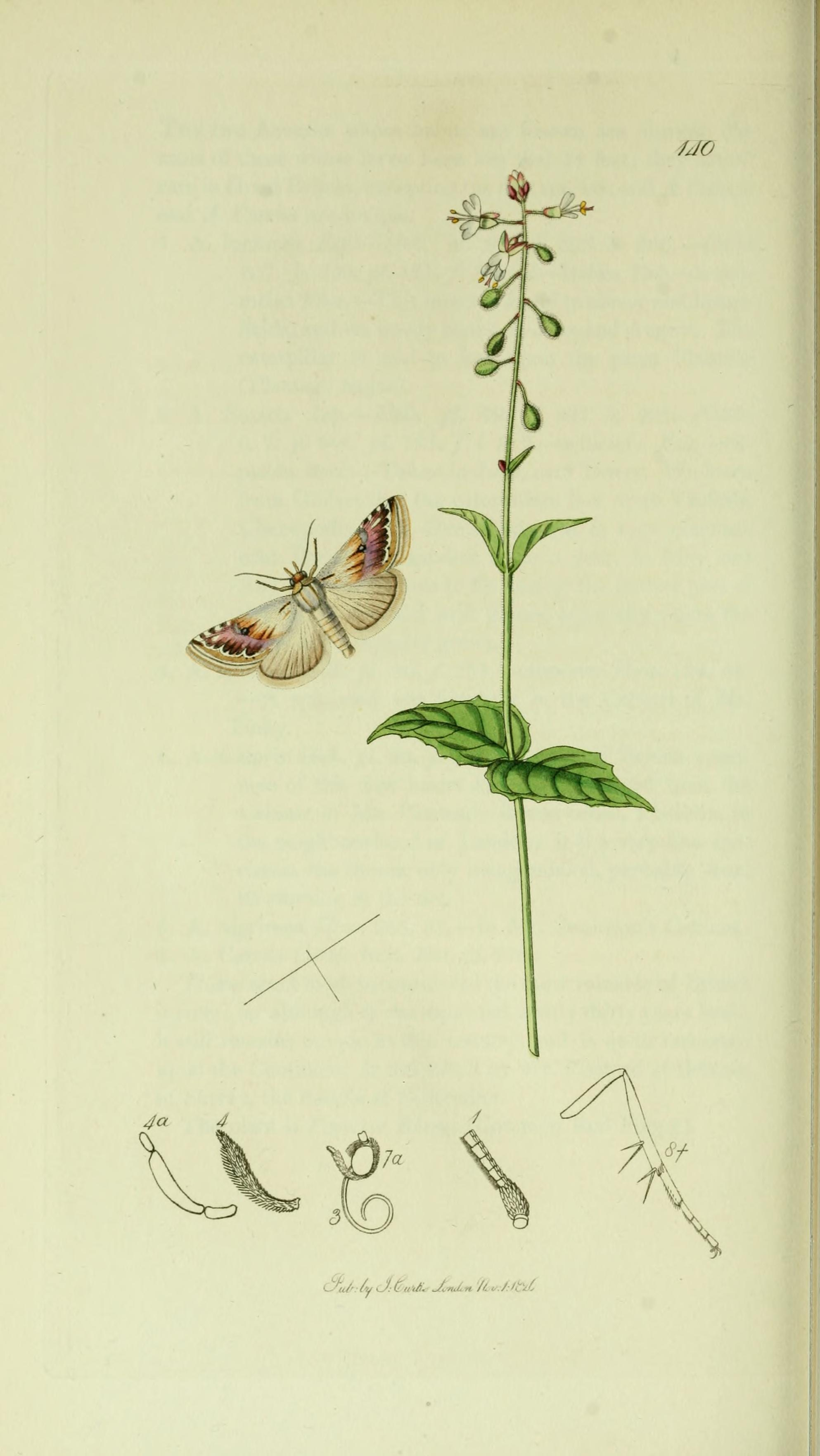
Illustration from John Curtis's British Entomology Volume 5

== Distribution ==
Eublemma ostrinum occurs throughout the Mediterranean including North Africa and is only occasionally found in Central Europe. Heading east the distribution area is from southern Russia, Asia minor, and Afghanistan. Occasional finds in northern Europe, such as in 1992 in the UK are usually migrant butterflies, although in 1999. larvae and pupae were found in South Devon and the Isle of Portland. Eublemma ostrinum is found in warm, dry areas.

== Technical description and variation ==
The wingspan is 18–25 millimetres (0.71–0.98 in). Forewing cream white, slightly tinged with pale brown in basal half and in terminal area; median shade diffuse, slightly outcurved, followed immediately by a black dot representing the reniform stigma; just beyond it on the costa an oblique purplish bar to vein 6 represents the outer line; submarginal line whitish, sharply indented on each fold and outcurved between, the interval between the two lines filled with purple except at costa beyond median line; the interspaces between the veins often streaked with deeper purple; a purple spot at apex with a blackish speck in it below; a purplish streak from base below cell; terminal line brown inwardly edged with white; fringe white, brownish in middle; hindwing brownish grey, darker along termen; terminal line dark; fringe white; in examples from Algeria and Morocco, besides the purplish tint between the two lines, the whole forewing, except partially along costa, is suffused with olive grey brown, = ab. suffusa ab. nov. [Warren]; —in aestivalis Guen., probably the early summer brood, the purplish tint is restricted to the shade immediately before the submarginal line; the hindwings are paler, in the male almost white, and the examples are smaller in expanse; — in carthami H. Sch., supposed to be the late summer brood, the creamy ground is faintly tinged with pale brown along the median line and on each side of the submarginal, which is sometimes accompanied externally by a few isolated black scales; apical patch grey brown; hindwing creamy, tinged with brown before termen; the fringe white.

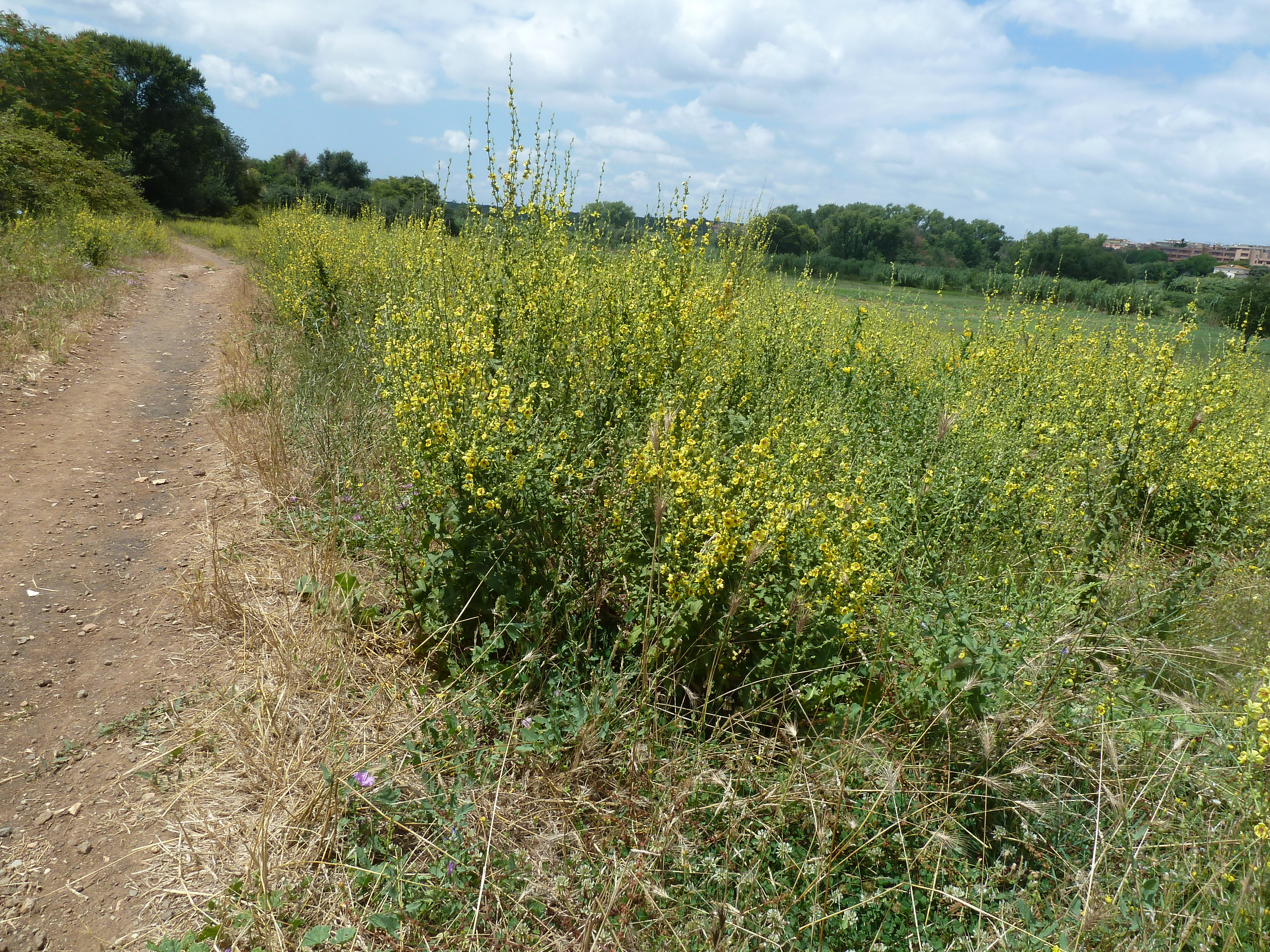
Habitat Parco della Caffarella, Rome, Italy

== Biology ==
Larva greyish yellow, with pale yellow dorsal line, prominent at the segmental incisions, and similar subdorsal and spiracular lines; head brown. The larvae feed on the flowers and seeds of Carlina vulgaris. Other recorded food plants include Carlina species in general, as well as Echinops, Carduus and Cirsium species.
