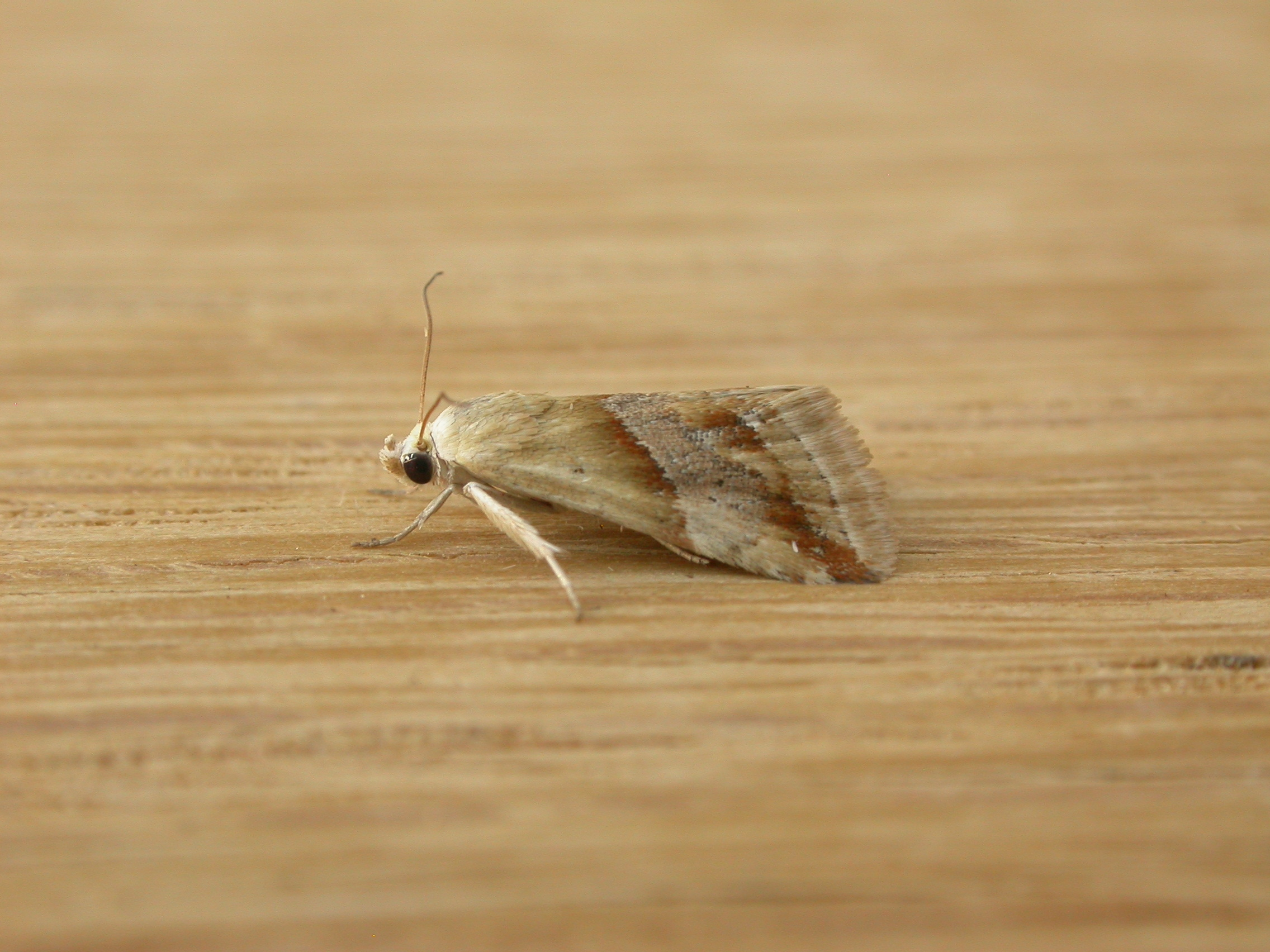

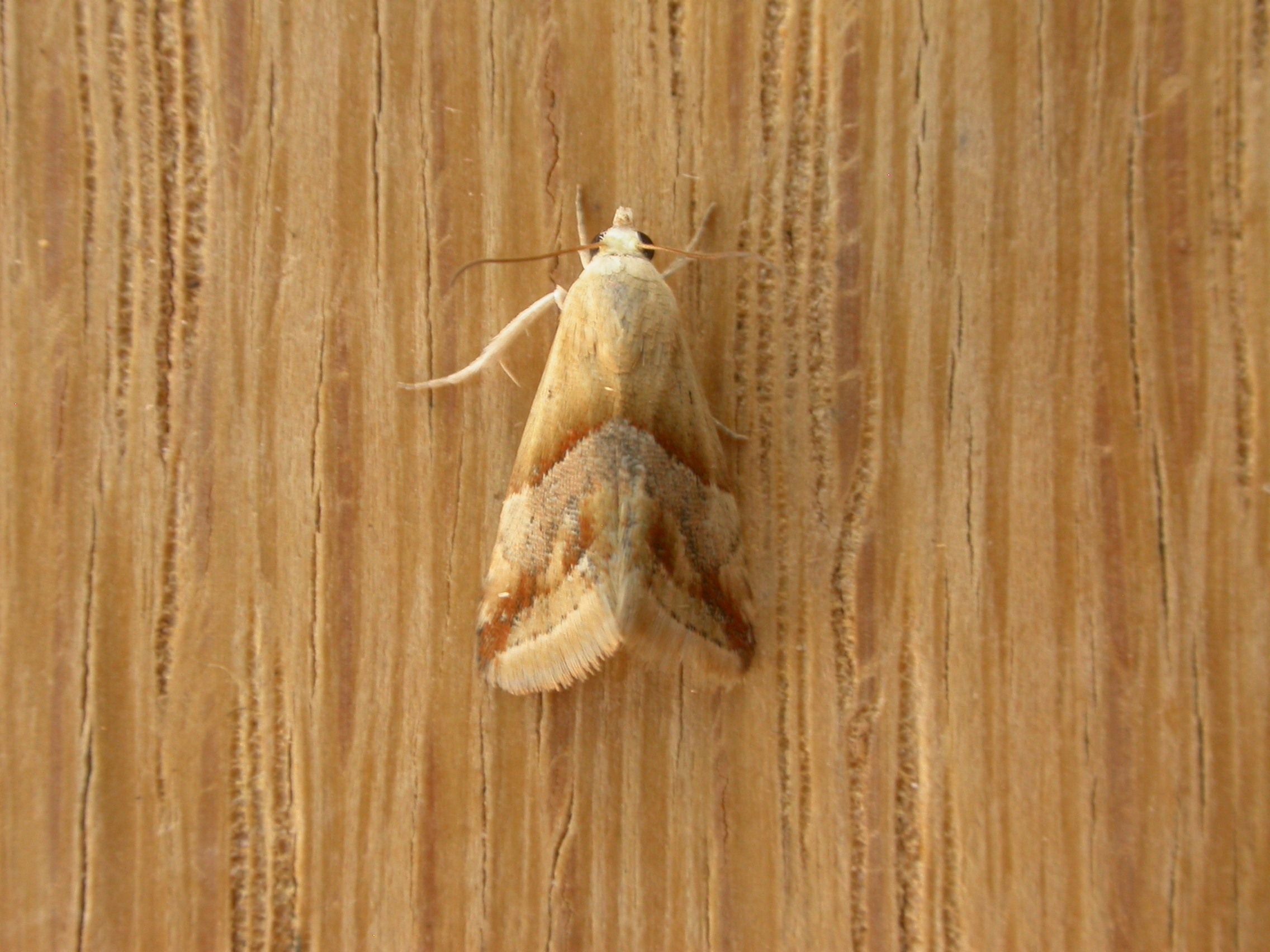

Scientific classification
- Kingdom: Animalia
- Phylum: Arthropoda
- Class: Insecta
- Order: Lepidoptera
- Superfamily: Noctuoidea
- Family: Erebidae
- Genus: Eublemma
- Species: E. inconspicua

Binomial name
- Eublemma inconspicua (Walker, 1865)

Synonyms
- Micra inconspicua Walker, 1865

= Eublemma inconspicua =

Species of moth

Eublemma inconspicua is a species of moth of the family Erebidae. It is known from Australia.
