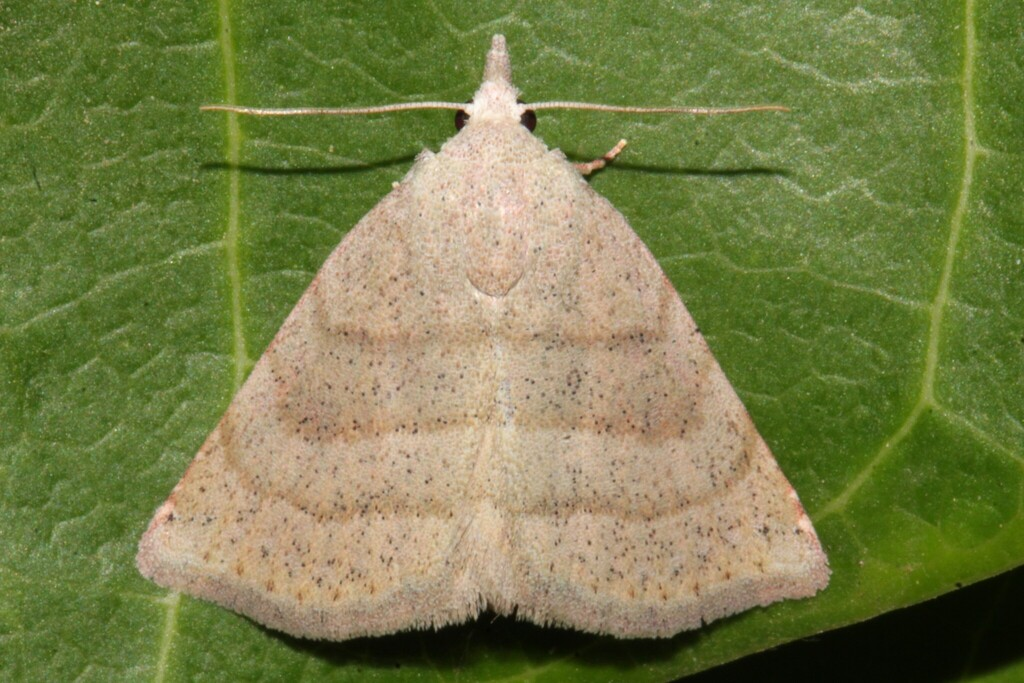

Scientific classification
- Kingdom: Animalia
- Phylum: Arthropoda
- Clade: Pancrustacea
- Class: Insecta
- Order: Lepidoptera
- Superfamily: Noctuoidea
- Family: Erebidae
- Genus: Eublemma
- Species: E. guiera

Binomial name
- Eublemma guiera Bradley, 1969

= Eublemma guiera =

Species of moth in West Africa

Eublemma guiera is a species of moth in the family Erebidae.

It was described by John David Bradley in 1969.

== Range ==
Eublemma guiera is found in West Africa, including Burkina Faso, Côte d'Ivoire, The Gambia, Nigeria, and Senegal.

== Ecology ==
The larva live in galls on the plant Guiera senegalensis caused by Vuilletia houardi.
