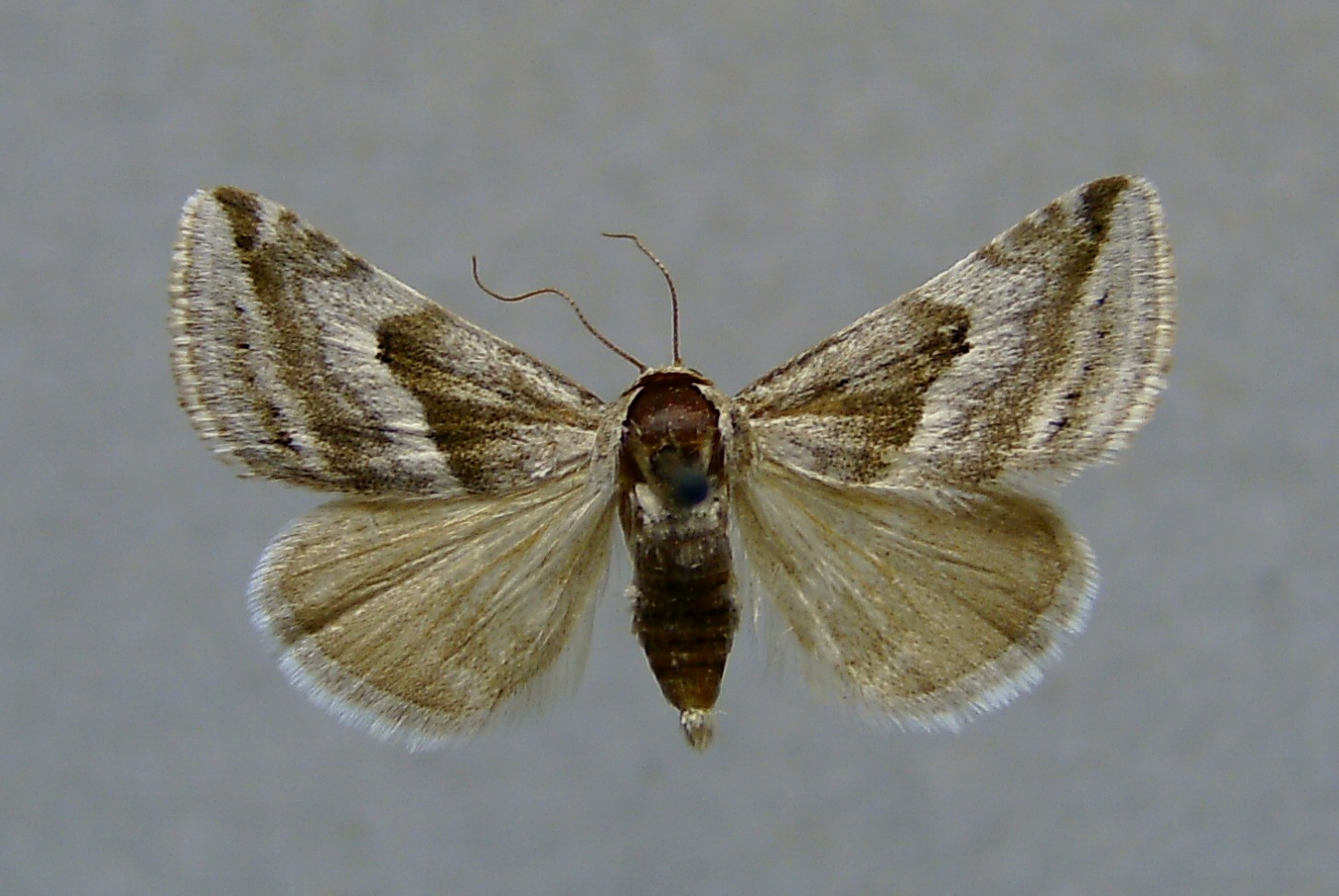
- Eublemma parallela

Scientific classification
- Domain: Eukaryota
- Kingdom: Animalia
- Phylum: Arthropoda
- Class: Insecta
- Order: Lepidoptera
- Superfamily: Noctuoidea
- Family: Erebidae
- Genus: Eublemma
- Species: E. parallela

Binomial name
- Eublemma parallela (Freyer, 1842)

Synonyms
- Anthophila parallela Freyer, 1841

= Eublemma parallela =

Species of moth

Eublemma parallela is a species of moth of the family Erebidae. It is found in Russia, Ukraine, Turkey, Syria, Armenia, Kazakhstan, Iraq and Iran.

The wingspan is 21–27 millimetres (0.83–1.06 in). Adults are on wing from June to July in one generation.
