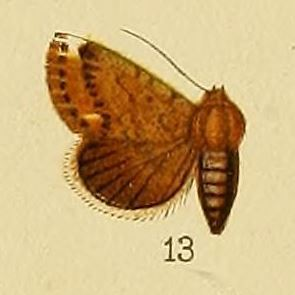
- Eublemma apicata

Scientific classification
- Kingdom: Animalia
- Phylum: Arthropoda
- Class: Insecta
- Order: Lepidoptera
- Superfamily: Noctuoidea
- Family: Erebidae
- Genus: Eublemma
- Species: E. apicata

Binomial name
- Eublemma apicata Distant, 1898

Synonyms
- Erastria acrochiona Mabille, 1900

= Eublemma apicata =

Species of moth

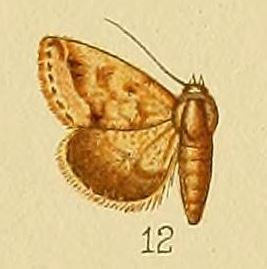
Eublemma apicata

Eublemma apicata is a species of moth of the family Erebidae. It is found in Tanzania, Malawi, Zimbabwe and South Africa.
