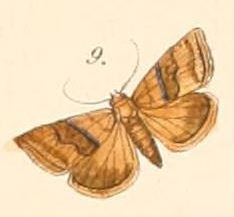

Scientific classification (disputed)
- Domain: Eukaryota
- Kingdom: Animalia
- Phylum: Arthropoda
- Class: Insecta
- Order: Lepidoptera
- Superfamily: Noctuoidea
- Family: Erebidae
- Genus: Eublemma
- Species: E. sperans

Binomial name
- Eublemma sperans (C. Felder & Rogenhofer, 1874)

Synonyms
- Thalpochares sperans Felder & Rogenhofer, 1874

= Eublemma sperans =

Species of moth

Eublemma sperans is a species of moth of the family Erebidae. It is found in South Africa. It is considered a synonym of Eublemma caffrorum by some sources.
