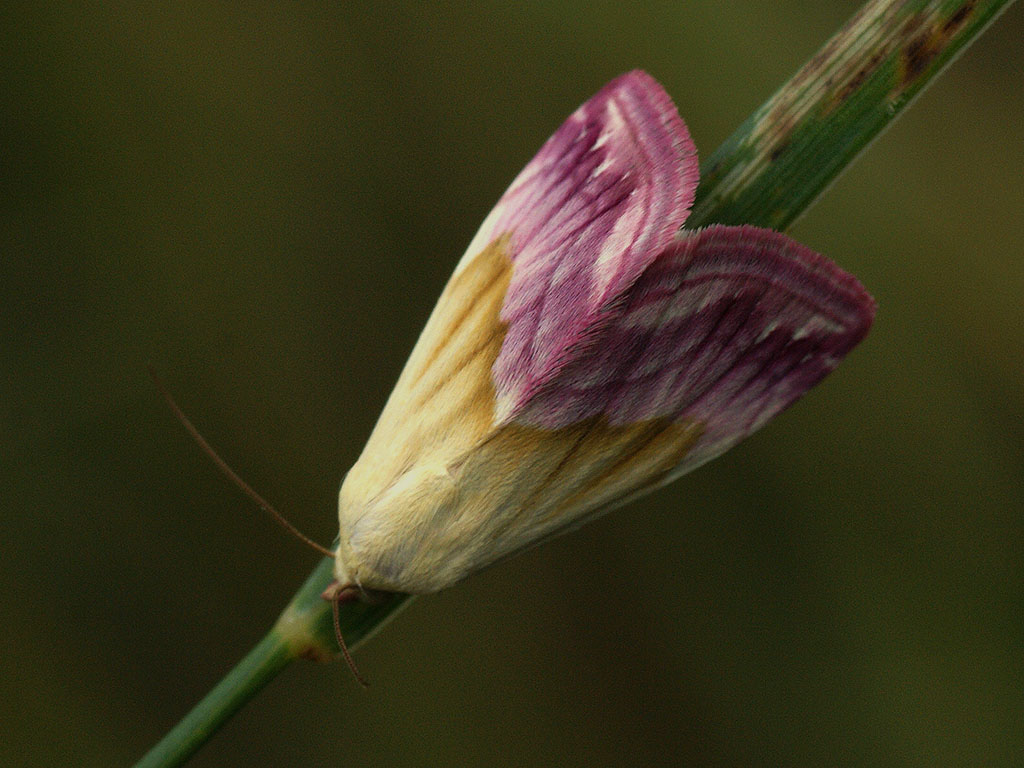

Scientific classification
- Domain: Eukaryota
- Kingdom: Animalia
- Phylum: Arthropoda
- Class: Insecta
- Order: Lepidoptera
- Superfamily: Noctuoidea
- Family: Erebidae
- Genus: Eublemma
- Species: E. purpurina

Binomial name
- Eublemma purpurina (Denis & Schiffermüller, 1775)

Synonyms
- Noctua purpurina [Schiffermüller], 1775

= Eublemma purpurina =

Beautiful marbled

Species of moth

Eublemma purpurina, the beautiful marbled, is a moth of the family Erebidae. The species was first described by Michael Denis and Ignaz Schiffermüller in 1775. It is found from North Africa through the Iberian Peninsula and southern France east to Romania, southern Russia, southern Turkey up to western central Asia. In the north it ranges to Valais, in eastern Austria and Hungary and the Czech Republic.

These moths have been observed to migrate towards recently burned forest areas in Western Bohemia forests in the Czech Republic alongside other moth species.

The wingspan is 20–26 millimetres (0.79–1.02 in). Adults are on wing from May to June and from August to September in two generations.

The larvae feed on creeping thistle (Cirsium arvense).
