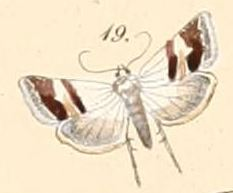

Scientific classification
- Domain: Eukaryota
- Kingdom: Animalia
- Phylum: Arthropoda
- Class: Insecta
- Order: Lepidoptera
- Superfamily: Noctuoidea
- Family: Erebidae
- Genus: Eublemma
- Species: E. ornatula

Binomial name
- Eublemma ornatula (Felder & Rogenhofer, 1874)

Synonyms
- Thalpochares ornatula Felder & Rogenhofer, 1874; Eublemma brunneosuffusa Strand, 1917

= Eublemma ornatula =

Species of moth

Eublemma ornatula is a species of moth of the family Erebidae. It is found in Kenya, Lesotho, Tanzania, South Africa, Uganda, and Zimbabwe.

== Biology ==
Known hostplant of the larvae is Helianthus annuus.
