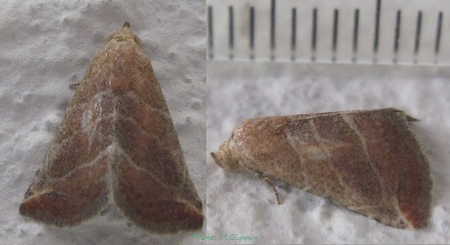

Scientific classification
- Kingdom: Animalia
- Phylum: Arthropoda
- Clade: Pancrustacea
- Class: Insecta
- Order: Lepidoptera
- Superfamily: Noctuoidea
- Family: Erebidae
- Subfamily: Boletobiinae
- Genus: Eublemma; Hübner, 1829

Synonyms
- Anthophila Ochsenheimer, 1816; Porphyrinia Hübner, [1821]; Eromene Hübner, [1821]; Trothisa Hübner, [1821]; Ecthetis Hübner, [1823]; Heliomanes Sodoffsky, 1837; Micra Guenée, 1841; Thalpochares Lederer, 1853; Silda Walker, 1863; Thalomicra Spuler, 1907; Coccidiphaga Spuler, 1907; Zonesthiousa Thierry-Mieg, 1907; Polyorycta Warren, 1911; Microxestis Hampson, 1912; Gyophora Warren, 1913; Homodina Hampson, 1926; Eupsoropsis Berio, 1969; Eumicremma Berio, 1954; Glossodice Berio, 1991; Roseoblemma Beck, 1996; Panoblemma Beck, 1996; Parvablemma Beck, 1996

= Eublemma =

Genus of moths

Eublemma is a genus of moths of the family Erebidae described by Jacob Hübner in 1829.

== Taxonomy ==
The genus has previously been classified in the subfamily Eublemminae within Erebidae or in the subfamily Eustrotiinae of the family Noctuidae.

== Description ==
Its palpi are upturned and reach just above the vertex of the head, and have a short third joint. The antennae are minutely ciliated in the male. Thorax and abdomen smoothly scaled. Legs short, tibia moderately hairy. Forewings with somewhat produced and depressed apex. Veins 6 and 7 from angle of cell and veins 8 to 10 stalked from before angle. Hindwings with veins 3,4 and 6,7 from angles of cell. Larva with two pairs of abdominal prolegs.

== Species ==
In alphabetical order:

- Eublemma acarodes Swinhoe, 1907
- Eublemma accedens (Felder & Rogenhofer, 1874) Burkina Faso, Gambia, Ghana, Nigeria, Saudi Arabia, Ethiopia, Kenya, Tanzania, Malawi, Zaire, Magagascar, Indo-Australian Tropics, Australia, New Caledonia, Fiji
- Eublemma acuta Candéze, 1927 Cambodia
- Eublemma acutiangulatalis (Rothschild, 1915) New Guinea
- Eublemma aethiopiana Hacker, 2019 Ethiopia
- Eublemma afghana (Wiltshire, 1961) Afghanistan
- Eublemma aftob (Brandt, 1938) Iran
- Eublemma agnella (Brandt, 1938) Iran
- Eublemma agrapta Hampson, 1898 Sri Lanka
- Eublemma albicans Guenée, 1852
- Eublemma albicosta Hampson, 1910 Gambia, Liberia, Sierra Leone, Burkina Faso, Ghana, Gabon
- Eublemma albida (Duponchel, 1843) southern Spain, Morocco, Algeria, Libya, Mauritania, Gambia
- Eublemma albifascia Hampson, 1910 Burkina Faso, Ivory Coast, Ghana, Nigeria, Cameroon, Tanzania
- Eublemma albipennis Hampson, 1910 India (Maharashtra)
- Eublemma albipurpurea (Warren, 1913) New Guinea
- Eublemma albivena (Hampson, 1905) Ethiopia, Kenya, Zaire, Uganda, Malawi, Tanzania, South Africa
- Eublemma albivestalis Hampson, 1910
- Eublemma albivia Hampson, 1914 Ghana, Nigeria, Ethiopia, Malawi, Tanzania
- Eublemma alboseriata Hacker, 2019 Nigeria
- Eublemma albostriata Wileman & West, 1929 Philippines
- Eublemma alexi Fibiger & Hacker, 2002 Togo, Burkina Faso, Nigeria, Saudi Arabia, Sudan, Ethiopia, Malawi, Tanzania, Zimbabwe, Namibia, South Africa
- Eublemma aliena (Krüger, 1939) Libya
- Eublemma almaviva Berio, 1947
- Eublemma amabilis Moore, [1884] Sri Lanka
- Eublemma amasina (Eversmann, 1842) southern Urals, south-eastern Siberia, Japan
- Eublemma amoena (Hübner, [1803]) northern Africa, southern Europe, Turkey, Transcaucasia, Caucasus
- Eublemma amphidasys Turner, 1933 Australia (Queensland)
- Eublemma amydrosana Rebel, 1947 Egypt
- Eublemma anachoresis Wallengren, 1863
- Eublemma angulata (Butler, 1882) New Britain
- Eublemma angustizona Hacker, 2019 South Africa
- Eublemma antemediana (Hacker, 2011) Yemen
- Eublemma antoninae Nagaraja & Nagarkatti, 1970 southern India
- Eublemma apicata Distant, 1898 South Africa, Zimbabwe, Malawi, Tanzania, Kenya
- Eublemma apicimacula (Mabille, 1880) Mauritania, Senegal, Gambia, Togo, Ivory Coast, Ghana, Nigeria, Burkina Faso, Cameroon, Gabon, Djibouti, Ethiopia, Uganda, Kenya, Tanzania, Mozambique, Madagascar, Zambia, Zimbabwe, South Africa, Yemen
- Eublemma apicipunctalis Brandt, 1939
- Eublemma apicipunctum Saalmüller, 1891
- Eublemma archaechroma Hacker, 2019 Namibia
- Eublemma arenostrota Hampson, 1916 Somalia
- Eublemma argentifera (Hampson, 1926) Sierra Leone, southern Nigeria, Cameroon, Gabon, Uganda
- Eublemma argyromorpha Hacker & Saldaitis, 2011 Sokotra
- Eublemma atrifusa Hampson, 1910 Ghana, Nigeria
- Eublemma atrimedia Hampson, 1914
- Eublemma aurantiaca Hampson, 1910 Sierra Leone, Burkina Faso, Ghana, Ivory Coast, Nigeria, Gabon, Ethiopia, Kenya, Uganda, Malawi, Zambia, Zimbabwe, South Africa, Madagascar
- Eublemma aureola Fibiger & Hacker, 2002 Turkey
- Eublemma baccalix (Swinhoe, 1886) India (Madhya Pradesh), Sri Lanka
- Eublemma baccatrix Hacker, 2019 Canary Islands, Mauritania, Burkina Faso, Nigeria, Togo, Gambia, Zaire, Arabia, Ethiopia, Kenya, Uganda, Malawi, Angola, Tanzania, Mozambique, Namibia, Eswatini, Zambia, Zimbabwe, South Africa, Madagascar, Mauritius
- Eublemma bacchusi Holloway, 2009 Borneo
- Eublemma barito Holloway, 2009 Peninsular Malaysia, Sumatra, Borneo
- Eublemma barlowi Holloway, 2009 Peninsular Malaysia, Singapore, Borneo
- Eublemma basalis (Möschler, 1890) Puerto Rico
- Eublemma basiplaga Bethune-Baker, 1911 Angola
- Eublemma batanga Draudt, 1950
- Eublemma betarosea Holloway, 2009 Borneo
- Eublemma bicolora Bethune-Baker, 1911
- Eublemma bifasciata (Moore, 1881) India (Uttar Pradesh), Arabia, Sudan, Ethiopia, Kenya, Niger, South Africa
- Eublemma bilineata Hampson, 1902 India (Himachal Pradesh)
- Eublemma bipars Gaede, 1935 Niger
- Eublemma bipartita Hampson, 1902 South Africa, Namibia, Zimbabwe
- Eublemma biparva Fibiger & Hacker, 2002 Saudi Arabia, Ethiopia
- Eublemma bistellata (Wiltshire, 1961) Arabia
- Eublemma blanca Fibiger & Legrain, 2009 Saudi Arabia
- Eublemma bolinia (Hampson, 1902) Arabia, Ethiopia, Kenya, Malawi, Tanzania, Mozambique, Botswana, Zimbabwe, Namibia, South Africa, Madagascar
- Eublemma bosara Holloway, 2009 Borneo, Peninsular Malaysia
- Eublemma boursini (Bytinski-Salz & Brandt, 1937) Iran
- Eublemma brachyptera Hacker, 2019 South Africa
- Eublemma brachystegiae Hacker, 2019 Malawi
- Eublemma brigitta Fiebig, 2019 Uganda
- Eublemma brunneifusa Gaede, 1935 Cameroon
- Eublemma brunneosa Bethune-Baker, 1911 Kenya
- Eublemma brygooi Viette, 1966
- Eublemma buettikeri Wiltshire, 1980 Arabia
- Eublemma bulla (Swinhoe, [1885]) Arabia, Sudan, Pakistan, India (Maharashtra)
- Eublemma caduca (Christoph, 1893)
- Eublemma caelestis (Brandt, 1938) Iran
- Eublemma caffrorum (Wallengren, 1860) South Africa, Namibia, Zimbabwe, Botswana, Mozambique
- Eublemma candicans (Rambur, 1858) southern Spain, Morocco, Algeria
- Eublemma candidana (Fabricius, 1794) southern Europe, Turkey, Middle East, Caucasus, Transcaucasus
- Eublemma caniceps Rebel, 1917 Sudan
- Eublemma canomarmorea Hacker, Fiebig & Stadie, 2019 South Africa
- Eublemma caprearum Draudt, 1933 Capri
- Eublemma caretifera Holloway, 2009 Borneo
- Eublemma carneola Hampson, 1910 Peninsular Malaysia, Borneo
- Eublemma carneotincta Hampson, 1910 Guinea, Sierra Leone, Ivory Coast
- Eublemma carterotata Dyar, 1919 Costa Rica
- Eublemma ceresensis Hacker, 2019 Madagascar, South Africa, Namibia, Eswatini, Zimbabwe, Zaire
- Eublemma chamila Draudt, 1936 eastern Turkestan
- Eublemma chionophlebia Hampson, 1910 South Africa
- Eublemma chlorochroa Hampson, 1910 Ethiopia, Kenya, Tanzania
- Eublemma chlorotica (Lederer, 1858) Lebanon
- Eublemma chopardi Berio, 1954
- Eublemma chrysoleuca Hacker, 2019 South Africa
- Eublemma cinnamomea Herrich-Schäffer, 1868
- Eublemma cirrochroa Hacker, 2019 Tanzania
- Eublemma cochylioides (Guenée, 1852) south-western Europe, Sicily, Crete, Lebanon, Africa, Middle East, southern Asia, Indonesia, Micronesia, Australia, New Holland
- Eublemma colla Schaus, 1893
- Eublemma collacteana Hacker, 2019 Togo, Ivory Coast, Nigeria, Zaire, Ethiopia, Kenya, Tanzania
- Eublemma comutus Fibiger & Hacker, 2004 Yemen
- Eublemma confusa Rothschild, 1920 Algeria
- Eublemma conistrota Hampson, 1910 Pakistan, Afghanistan, Iran, Oman, Somalia
- Eublemma conspersa (Butler, 1880) India (Madhya Pradesh, Himachal Pradesh), Taiwan
- Eublemma convergens (Walker, 1869) Zaire
- Eublemma costivinata Berio, 1945 Ethiopia
- Eublemma cremorna Hampson, 1918
- Eublemma cyrenaea (Turati, 1924) Libya, Israel, Jordan, Yemen, Sinai
- Eublemma daphoena Hampson, 1910 South Africa
- Eublemma daphoenoides Berio, 1941 Somalia, Madagascar
- Eublemma debilis (Christoph, 1884) Crimea, Caucasus, southern European Russia, north-eastern Iran
- Eublemma debivar Berio, 1947
- Eublemma deleta (Staudinger, 1901) Malta, Algeria, Libya, Tunisia, Niger, Egypt, Arabia, Middle East
- Eublemma delicata (Felder & Rogenhofer, 1874) Ethiopia, Kenya, Tanzania, Botswana, Zimbabwe, South Africa, Namibia
- Eublemma deliciosa (Möschler, 1880) Suriname
- Eublemma dentilinea (Hampson, 1926) Uganda, Nigeria, Burkina Faso
- Eublemma deserta (Staudinger, 1900) Algeria, Tunisia, Libya, Malta, Arabia, Sudan, Djibouti
- Eublemma deserti Rothschild, 1909
- Eublemma dhofarica Hacker & Stadie, 2016 Oman, Yemen
- Eublemma dichroma Rebel, 1907 Sokotra
- Eublemma dimidialis (Fabricius, 1794) Indo-Australian tropics, New Guinea, Australia, Japan
- Eublemma dinawa Bethune-Baker, 1906
- Eublemma diredaoua Hacker, 2019 Ethiopia
- Eublemma dissecta (Saalmüller, 1891) Madagascar
- Eublemma dissoluta Rothschild, 1921 Niger
- Eublemma draudti (Bytinski-Salz & Brandt, 1937) Iran
- Eublemma dyscapna S. A. Fletcher, 1961 Uganda
- Eublemma eberti Hacker, 2019 Namibia
- Eublemma eburnea (Turati, 1927) Libya
- Eublemma ecthaemata Hampson, 1896 Mauritania, Gambia, Arabia, Sudan, northern Egypt, Ethiopia, Kenya, Tanzania, Namibia, Zimbabwe, South Africa
- Eublemma ecuadorensis (Hampson, 1918) Ecuador
- Eublemma ellipsifera Holloway, 2009 Borneo, Peninsular Malaysia
- Eublemma elychrysi (Rambur, 1833) Sardinia, Corsica
- Eublemma emir (Culot, 1915) Algeria
- Eublemma ephimera Hampson, 1910
- Eublemma epistrota Hampson, 1910 India (Himachal Pradesh)
- Eublemma eremochroa Hampson, 1916 Somalia
- Eublemma ernesti Rothschild, 1915
- Eublemma eupethecica Hampson, 1910
- Eublemma exanimis Hampson, 1918 Malawi
- Eublemma exigua (Walker, [1858]) India (Maharasthra), Cape Verde, Sierra Leone, Ghana, Burkina Faso, Nigeria, Zaire, Malawi, Uganda, Yemen, Ethiopia, Somalia, Kenya, Tanzania, Mozambique, Eswatini, Zimbabwe, South Africa, Angola, Madagascar, Comoros
- Eublemma faircloughi Holloway, 2009 Borneo
- Eublemma faroulti Rothschild, 1911
- Eublemma fasciola (Saalmüller, 1891) Madagascar
- Eublemma ferrufascia Hacker, 2019 Kenya, Ethiopia
- Eublemma ferruginata Hacker, 2019 Sierra Leone, Ivory Coast, Gabon, Nigeria, Ethiopia, Malawi, Tanzania
- Eublemma fiebigii Hacker & Stadie, 2019 South Africa
- Eublemma flavens Hacker, 2019 South Africa, Namibia, Eswatini, Tanzania, Ethiopia
- Eublemma flavescens Hampson, 1918 Ghana, Kenya, Malawi, Tanzania, Zimbabwe, Namibia, South Africa
- Eublemma flavia Hampson, 1910 Panama
- Eublemma flavibasis Hampson, 1918
- Eublemma flaviceps Hampson, 1902 South Africa, Zimbabwe, Arabia
- Eublemma flaviciliata Hampson, 1910
- Eublemma flavicosta Hampson, 1910 South Africa, Tanzania, Nigeria, Ghana, Ivory Coast
- Eublemma flavicostata (Holland, 1894) Gabon, Zaire, Ghana, Ivory Coast
- Eublemma flavida Hampson, 1902 South Africa, Namibia, Botswana, Eswatini
- Eublemma flavigilva Hacker, 2019 Namibia
- Eublemma flavinia Hampson, 1902
- Eublemma flavistriata Hampson, 1910 Ethiopia, Kenya, Uganda, Zaire, Ghana
- Eublemma flavitermina Hampson, 1910 South Africa
- Eublemma foedosa (Guenée, 1852) Kenya, Uganda, Zambia, Zimbabwe, South Africa
- Eublemma fredi Fibiger & Hacker, 2002 Saudi Arabia, Iran
- Eublemma fugitiva (Christoph, 1877) northern Iran
- Eublemma fulvitermina Hampson, 1910
- Eublemma galacteoides Berio, 1937 Somalia
- Eublemma gayneri (Rothschild, 1901) Iran, Jordan, Arabia, Egypt, Sudan, Ethiopia, Kenya, Tanzania, Libya, Algeria, Mauritania, Senegal, Burkina Faso, Gambia, Tanzania, Zimbabwe, Namibia, South Africa, Madagascar, India
- Eublemma geometriana Viette, 1981
- Eublemma gerti Fibiger & Hacker, 2002 Saudi Arabia, Ethiopia
- Eublemma geyri Rothschild, 1915 Algeria
- Eublemma glaucizona Hampson, 1908 South Africa
- Eublemma glaucochroa Turner, 1902 Australia, New Caledonia
- Eublemma globus Fibiger & Hacker, 2002 Yemen
- Eublemma goateri Fibiger & Hacker, 2004 Yemen
- Eublemma gondwana Hacker, 2019 Namibia
- Eublemma goniogramma Hampson, 1910 South Africa, Namibia
- Eublemma gratiosa (Eversmann, 1854) southern Urals?
- Eublemma gratissima (Staudinger, [1892]) western Kazakhstan, Turkey, Caucaus, Transcaucasia, Middle East, Iraq, Iran
- Eublemma griseofimbriata Gaede, 1935 South Africa, Namibia
- Eublemma guiera Bradley, 1969 Gambia, Senegal, Ivory Coast, Burkina Faso, Nigeria
- Eublemma hansa (Herrich-Schäffer, [1851]) southern Urals, Turkey, Caucasus, Transcaucasia, Iran
- Eublemma hemichiasma Hacker, 2019 South Africa, Namibia, Ethiopia
- Eublemma hemichiona Hampson, 1918 Malawi, Tanzania
- Eublemma heterogramma (Mabille, 1881) Angola
- Eublemma heteropaura Hacker, 2019 Ethiopia, Tanzania
- Eublemma himmighoffeni (Millière, 1867) Spain, southern France, Corsica, Croatia, Greece, southern Iran, South Africa
- Eublemma hypozonata Hampson, 1910 Kenya
- Eublemma ignefusa Hampson, 1910 Singapore, Peninsular Malaysia, Sumatra, Borneo
- Eublemma illimitata (Warren, 1914) South Africa, Ethiopia
- Eublemma illota Christoph, 1887
- Eublemma inconspicua Walker, 1865
- Eublemma indistincta Fibiger & Hacker, 2002 Yemen
- Eublemma innocens (Butler, 1886) Australia
- Eublemma innotabilis Hacker, 2019 Yemen
- Eublemma insignifica Rothschild, 1924 Madagascar
- Eublemma intricata (Walker, 1869) Zaire
- Eublemma ionoplagiata Hacker & Saldaitis, 2011 Sokotra
- Eublemma iophaenna Turner, 1920 Australia (Queensland)
- Eublemma irresoluta Dyar, 1919
- Eublemma isocroca Hacker, 2019 Tanzania, Ethiopia
- Eublemma jocularis (Christoph, 1877) northern Iran
- Eublemma joergmuelleri Hacker & Schreier, 2019 Ethiopia
- Eublemma juergenschmidli Hacker, 2019 Namibia
- Eublemma kettlewelli Wiltshire, 1988 Botswana, Namibia, South Africa
- Eublemma keyserlingi Bienert, 1869
- Eublemma khalifa (Wiltshire, 1961) Arabia
- Eublemma khonoides Wiltshire, 1980 Arabia, Ethiopia
- Eublemma kruegeri (Wiltshire, 1970) Sudan, Libya, Israel, Jordan, Palestine
- Eublemma kuelekana Staudinger, 1871
- Eublemma lacteicosta Hampson, 1910 Nigeria, Ivory Coast
- Eublemma lacteola Rothschild, 1914
- Eublemma latericolor Turner, 1945
- Eublemma lativalva Hacker, 2019 South Africa, Namibia
- Eublemma legraini Hacker, 2019 South Africa, Namibia, Zambia, Malawi
- Eublemma lentirosea Hampson, 1910
- Eublemma leptinia Mabille, 1900
- Eublemma leucanides (Staudinger, 1889) Issyk-kul
- Eublemma leucanitis Hampson, 1910 South Africa
- Eublemma leucodesma (Lower, 1899) Australia (Queensland)
- Eublemma leucodicranon Grünberg, 1910 Namibia
- Eublemma leucomelana Hampson, 1902
- Eublemma leuconeura Hampson, 1910 South Africa, Namibia
- Eublemma leucopolia Hacker, 2019 Namibia
- Eublemma leucota Hampson, 1910 Saudi Arabia, Iran, Israel, Jordan, Afghanistan
- Eublemma leucozona Hampson, 1910 Eritrea, Ethiopia, Kenya, Tanzania
- Eublemma lithina (Warren, 1913) Halmaheira
- Eublemma loxographa Hacker & Saldaitis, 2016 Sokotra
- Eublemma lozostropha Turner, 1902 Australia (Queensland)
- Eublemma lucanitis Hampson, 1910 South Africa
- Eublemma lutosa (Staudinger, [1892]) Syria, Turkey
- Eublemma macrocroca Hacker, 2019 Sierra Leone, Gambia, Ivory Coast, Nigeria, Burkina Faso, Gabon
- Eublemma macrotephra Hacker, 2019 Ivory Coast, Nigeria, Cameroon
- Eublemma madaphaea Hacker, 2019 Madagascar
- Eublemma manakhana Hacker & Schreier, 2019 Yemen
- Eublemma maraschensis Osthelder, 1933
- Eublemma marginula (Herrich-Schäffer, [1851])
- Eublemma marmaropa Meyrick, 1902 Australia (Queensland), New Guinea
- Eublemma marmorata Wileman & West, 1929 Philippines, Borneo
- Eublemma martini Holloway, 2009 Borneo, Peninsular Malaysia
- Eublemma mauritanica Hacker, 2019 Mauritania, Burkina Faso
- Eublemma maurochroa Hacker, 2019 Gabon
- Eublemma maurocroca Hacker, 2019 Nigeria
- Eublemma maxima Fibiger & Hacker, 2002 Yemen
- Eublemma mediana Fibiger & Hacker, 2004 Yemen
- Eublemma mediovittata Hacker & Saldaitis, 2016 Sokotra
- Eublemma megistodea Hacker, 2019 Kenya
- Eublemma melabasis (Hampson, 1914) northern Nigeria, Ethiopia, Kenya, South Africa
- Eublemma melabela Hampson, 1910 Pakistan
- Eublemma melanodonta Hampson, 1910 South Africa, Namibia, Botswana
- Eublemma melanoplera Hacker, 2019 Zaire, Uganda, Tanzania
- Eublemma melasema Hampson, 1918
- Eublemma mesodonta Hacker & Stadie, 2019 Oman
- Eublemma mesophaea Hampson, 1910 Cape Verde?, Arabia, Ethiopia, Malawi, Tanzania, Namibia, Zimbabwe, South Africa, Madagascar
- Eublemma mesozona Hampson, 1914 Ghana, Eritrea
- Eublemma metachrostica Hacker, 2019 South Africa
- Eublemma miasma Hampson, 1891
- Eublemma microcroca Hacker, 2019 Mauritania, Togo, Burkina Faso, Nigeria, Gabon
- Eublemma microphysa Hacker, 2019 Namibia
- Eublemma microptera (Brandt, 1939) Iran
- Eublemma microtephra Hacker, 2019 Cameroon
- Eublemma minima (Guenée, 1852) southern US - Argentina, Antilles – everlasting bud moth
- Eublemma miniparva Fibiger & Hacker, 2002 Yemen, Ethiopia, Tanzania
- Eublemma minutata (Fabricius, 1794) western Europe, central Europe, Turkey, north-western Iran, Arabia Harmokääpiöyökkönen Scarce Marbled Zwergeulchen
- Eublemma minutoides Poole, 1989 Kenya, Tanzania
- Eublemma minutulalis Hacker, 2016 Yemen
- Eublemma misturata Hampson, 1910
- Eublemma mkalama Hacker, 2019 Tanzania
- Eublemma monotona Le Cerf, 1911
- Eublemma morosa Wiltshire, 1970
- Eublemma munda (Christoph, 1884)
- Eublemma murati (Brandt, 1939) Iran
- Eublemma muscatensis Wiltshire, 1980 Arabia
- Eublemma nelvai Rothschild, 1920 Algeria
- Eublemma nigribasis Bethune-Baker, 1911
- Eublemma nigrifascia Hacker, 2019 Somalia
- Eublemma nigrivitta Hampson, 1902 Namibia, South Africa, Zimbabwe, Botswana, Malawi, Somalia
- Eublemma nives (Brandt, 1938) Iran
- Eublemma niviceps Hacker & Saldaitis, 2019 Sokotra
- Eublemma noctuelioides (Wiltshire, 1971) Afghanistan
- Eublemma notochroma Hacker, 2019 Namibia
- Eublemma notoleuca Hacker, 2019 Namibia, South Africa
- Eublemma notoparva Hacker, 2019 Namibia
- Eublemma nuristana (Wiltshire, 1961) Afghanistan
- Eublemma nyctichroa Hampson, 1910 Kenya, Ethiopia
- Eublemma nyctopa Bethune-Baker, 1911 Angola
- Eublemma obscura (Krüger, 1939) Libya
- Eublemma ochrata Hacker, 2019 Senegal, Burkina Faso, Nigeria, Ethiopia, Malawi, Tanzania
- Eublemma ochreola (Staudinger, 1900) Greece, Macedonia, Turkey, Lebanon, north-western Iran
- Eublemma ochricosta Hampson, 1916 Arabia, Sudan, Somalia, Tanzania
- Eublemma ochrobasis Hampson, 1910 South Africa
- Eublemma ochrochroa Hampson, 1910 Sierra Leone
- Eublemma ochropolia Hacker, 2019 South Africa
- Eublemma odontophora Hampson, 1910 Saudi Arabia
- Eublemma oliva Fibiger & Hacker, 2002 Yemen
- Eublemma olmii Berio, 1937
- Eublemma ornatula (Felder & Rogenhofer, 1874) Kenya, Uganda, Tanzania, Zimbabwe, South Africa
- Eublemma orthogramma (Snellen, 1872) Sierra Leone, Togo, Ivory Coast, Burkina Faso, Nigeria, Cameroon, Gabon, Zaire, Tanzania, Madagascar
- Eublemma ostrina (Hübner, [1808]) Mauritania, northern Africa, southern Europe, Middle East, Turkey, Caucasus, Transcaucasia, Arabia, Ethiopia, Sudan, Niger – purple marbled moth
- Eublemma pallidula (Herrich-Schäffer, 1856) Turkey, Armenia, Cyprus, Ukraine, Lebanon, Israel, Jordan, Iran, Iraq, Arabia, Kyrgyzstan, Turkmenistan, Uzbekistan
- Eublemma pallidulalis Hacker, 2019 South Africa, Namibia
- Eublemma pannonica Freyer, 1840
- Eublemma panonica (Freyer, 1840) southern Urals
- Eublemma parallela (Freyer, 1842) southern Urals, Turkey, Caucasus, Transcaucasia, north-western Iran
- Eublemma parva (Hübner, [1808]) Mauritania, northern Africa, southern Europe, central Europe, Middle East, Turkey, Caucasus, Transcaucasia, Iraq, Iran, Afghanistan, Pakistan, Arabia, Sudan, Niger, north-western India, Australia – small marbled moth
- Eublemma parvisi Berio, 1940
- Eublemma parvoides (Brandt, 1939) Iran, Oman
- Eublemma pendula de Joannis, 1928 Vietnam
- Eublemma penicillata Hampson, 1902 South Africa, Eswatini, Zimbabwe, Tanzania
- Eublemma pennula (Felder & Rogenhofer, 1874) Yemen, Ethiopia, Kenya, Tanzania, Zimbabwe, South Africa, Madagascar
- Eublemma perkeo Rothschild, 1921 Burkina Fasoe, Niger, Ethiopia, Kenya, Tanzania, Namibia
- Eublemma permixta (Staudinger, 1897) Algeria
- Eublemma pernivea Rothschild, 1920
- Eublemma perobliqua Hampson, 1910 Kenya, Tanzania
- Eublemma perturbata Hacker, 2019 Cameroon, Yemen, Ethiopia, Kenya, Tanzania, Comoros
- Eublemma phaeapera Hampson, 1910
- Eublemma phaeotephra Hacker, 2019 Nigeria
- Eublemma plagiochroma Hacker, 2016 Yemen, Sudan, Kenya, Tanzania, Zimbabwe, Mauritania, Ghana
- Eublemma plagirosea Holloway, 2009 Bornoeo, Peninsular Malaysia
- Eublemma plectroversa Hacker, 2019 Ethiopia, Kenya
- Eublemma plumbosa Distant, 1899
- Eublemma poliochila Hacker, 2019 South Africa
- Eublemma poliochra Hacker, 2019 Ethiopia, Kenya, Tanzania, Zimbabwe, South Africa, Angola, Gabon, Liberia, Sierra Leone, Madagascar
- Eublemma politzari Hacker, 2019 Burkina Faso
- Eublemma polygramma (Duponchel, [1842]) northern Africa, southern Europe, Turkey, Cyprus, Caucasus, Transcaucasia, Middle East, Iran
- Eublemma popovi (Wiltshire, 1953) Persia
- Eublemma porphyrescens Hampson, 1914
- Eublemma porphyrina (Freyer, 1845) south-western Siberia
- Eublemma postrosea Gaede, 1935
- Eublemma postrufa Hampson, 1914
- Eublemma postrufoides Poole, 1989
- Eublemma posttornalis Rothschild, 1915
- Eublemma prolai (Berio, 1977) Tanzania
- Eublemma proleuca Hampson, 1910 Ghana, southern Nigeria, Gabon, Uganda, Tanzania
- Eublemma psamathea Hampson, 1910 Ethiopia, Kenya, Tanzania, Angola
- Eublemma pseudepistrota (Brandt, 1938) Iran
- Eublemma pseudonoctua Rothschild, 1921 Nigeria
- Eublemma pseudostrina Rothschild, 1914
- Eublemma pseudoviridis (Brandt, 1939) Iran
- Eublemma pudica (Snellen, 1880) Indo-Australian tropics - Queensland, Samoa
- Eublemma pudorina (Staudinger, 1889) Greece, Bulgaria, Romania, Ukraine, Turkey
- Eublemma pulcherrima Wiltshire, 1982 Arabia, Ethiopia, Uganda
- Eublemma pulchra (Swinhoe, 1886) India (Madhya Pradesh)
- Eublemma pulverulenta (Warren & Rothschild, 1905) Sudan
- Eublemma punctilinea Hampson, 1902 South Africa
- Eublemma pura (Hübner, [1813]) northern Africa, south-western Europe
- Eublemma purinula Turati, 1934
- Eublemma purpurina (Denis & Schiffermüller, 1775) northern Africa, central Europe, southern Europe, Turkey, Caucasus, south-western Siberia
- Eublemma purulenta Turati, 1934
- Eublemma pusilla (Eversmann, 1837) southern Urals, Turkey, Caucasus, Transcaucasia
- Eublemma pyrastis Hampson, 1910 South Africa
- Eublemma pyrochroa Hampson, 1918 Gambia, Senegal, Ghana, Ivory Coast, Burkina Faso, Nigeria, Chad, Malawi
- Eublemma pyrosticta de Joannis, 1910
- Eublemma quadrilineata (Moore, 1881) India (West Bengal), Pakistan, Eritrea, Malawi
- Eublemma quinarioides Berio, 1947
- Eublemma ragusana Freyer, 1845
- Eublemma ragusanoides Berio, 1954
- Eublemma recta Guenée, 1852 – straight-lined seed moth
- Eublemma reducta Butler, 1894
- Eublemma reninigra Berio, 1945
- Eublemma respersa Hübner, 1790
- Eublemma reussi Gaede, 1935
- Eublemma rhodocraspis Druce, 1909 Borneo
- Eublemma rietzi Fibiger, Ronkay, Zilli & Yela, 2010 Spain
- Eublemma rivula (Moore, 1882) India (West Bengal), Australia, Kenya, Malawi, Botswana, South Africa, Seychelles
- Eublemma robertsi (Berio, 1969) Mauritania, Nigeria, Togo, Zaire, Arabia, Djibouti, Somalia, Ethiopia, Kenya, Tanzania, north-western India
- Eublemma ronkayorum Fibiger & Hacker, 2002 Turkmenistan
- Eublemma rosea (Hübner, 1790) southern Europe, Turkey, Transcaucasia, Caucasus, southern Urals - Transbaikalia
- Eublemma roseana (Moore, 1881) India, Borneo, New Quinea, Queensland, Bismarcks, Oman
- Eublemma rosearcuata Holloway, 2009 Borneo, Peninsular Malaysia
- Eublemma rosecincta Hampson, 1910
- Eublemma roseonivea (Walker, [1863]) Borneo, Peninsular Malaysia
- Eublemma roseoniveoides Holloway, 2009 Borneo
- Eublemma rosibrunnea Holloway, 2009 Borneo, Peninsular Malaysia
- Eublemma rosina Hübner, [1803]
- Eublemma rosinans Lucas, 1938 Morocco
- Eublemma rubricilia Hampson, 1902 Sikkim, Bhutan, Singapore
- Eublemma rubripuncta Hampson, 1902
- Eublemma rufimixta Hampson, 1918
- Eublemma rufipuncta Turner, 1902 Australia (Queensland)
- Eublemma rufocastanea Rothschild, 1924 Madagascar
- Eublemma rufoglactea Holloway, 1979
- Eublemma rufolineata Hampson, 1918 Louisiade Islands
- Eublemma rufoscastanea Rothschild, 1924
- Eublemma rushi Wiltshire, 1961
- Eublemma sabia (Felder & Rogenhofer, 1874) South Africa
- Eublemma salangi (Wiltshire, 1961) Afghanistan (Hindu-Kush)
- Eublemma sarcosia Hampson, 1910 India (Madras)
- Eublemma savour Berio, 1950 Burkina Faso, Nigeria, Yemen, Sudan, Eritrea, Ethiopia, Kenya, Tanzania, Namibia, Zimbabwe, Madagascar
- Eublemma sciaphora Hampson, 1910
- Eublemma scitula (Rambur, 1833) southern Europe, tropical Africa, tropical Asia, Pakistan, New Guinea, Australia (introduced)
- Eublemma scituloides Rebel, 1917 Sudan, Togo
- Eublemma scitulum (Rambur, 1833)
- Eublemma scotina D. S. Fletcher, 1963 Uganda
- Eublemma scotopis Bethune-Baker, 1911 Mauritania, Senegal, Togo, Ivory Coast, Burkina Faso, Nigeria
- Eublemma seminivea Hampson, 1896 Arabia, Niger, Sudan, Ethiopia, Kenya, Tanzania, South Africa
- Eublemma semiochrea Krüger, 1939
- Eublemma sidanomia Hacker, Fiebig & Stadie, 2019 Ethiopia
- Eublemma siticulina Hacker, 2019 Ethiopia
- Eublemma siticulosa (Lederer, 1858) Syria, Israel, Iran, Iraq, Arabia
- Eublemma skoui Fibiger & Hacker, 2004 Yemen
- Eublemma sororcula Hacker, 2019 Tanzania
- Eublemma sperans Felder & Rogenhofer, 1874
- Eublemma spirogramma Rebel, 1912 Mauritania, Togo, Burkina Faso, Nigeria, Sudan, Egypt, Ethiopia, Kenya, South Africa
- Eublemma squalida (Staudinger, 1878) northern Iran, Algeria
- Eublemma squamilinea (Felder & Rogenhofer 1874)
- Eublemma staudingeri (Wallengren, 1875) South Africa, Zimbabwe, Yemen, Eritrea, Nigeria
- Eublemma stenodea Hacker, 2019 Namibia
- Eublemma stictilinea Hampson, 1910
- Eublemma straminea (Staudinger, [1892]) Greece, Turkey, Lebanon, Israel, Iraq, Iran, Arabia, Sinai
- Eublemma striantula (Wiltshire, 1961) Afghanistan
- Eublemma stygiochroa Hampson, 1910
- Eublemma subflavipes Hacker & Saldaitis, 2010 Yemen
- Eublemma subrufula Rothschild, 1924 Madagascar
- Eublemma subvenata (Staudinger, 1892) Tunisia, Algeria, Israel, Jordan, Arabia
- Eublemma suppuncta (Staudinger, [1892]) Turkey
- Eublemma suppura (Staudinger, [1892]) Turkey, Lebanon
- Eublemma sydolia Schaus, 1940 Puerto Rico
- Eublemma symphona Prout, 1928
- Eublemma syrtensis Hampson, 1910 Algeria
- Eublemma tachycornis (Strand, 1920) Taiwan
- Eublemma taftana (Brandt, 1941) Iran
- Eublemma taifensis Wiltshire, 1980 Arabia
- Eublemma tephroclytioides Rothschild, 1924
- Eublemma terminimaculata Wileman, 1915 Taiwan
- Eublemma therma Hampson, 1910 Kenya, Namibia, South Africa
- Eublemma thermobasis Hampson, 1910 Jordan, Morocco
- Eublemma thermochroa Hampson, 1910 South Africa, Namibia
- Eublemma thermosticta Hampson, 1910
- Eublemma thurneri Zerny, 1935
- Eublemma titanica Hampson, 1910
- Eublemma tomentalis Rebel, 1947 Israel, Arabia, Egypt
- Eublemma topi Fibiger & Hacker, 2006 Yemen, Ethiopia, Tanzania
- Eublemma trifasciata (Moore, 1881) India, Borneo
- Eublemma trigramma Hampson, 1910 Togo, Burkina Fase, Nigeria, Ethiopia, Tanzania, Zambia, Zimbabwe, Angola
- Eublemma tritonia (Hampson, 1902) Ethiopia, Somalia, Malawi, Zaire, Uganda, Tanzania, Zimbabwe, South Africa
- Eublemma trollei Fibigier & Hacker, 2006 Yemen
- Eublemma truncatalis (Walker, 1863) Borneo
- Eublemma trusmadi Holloway, 2009 Borneo, Peninsular Malaysia
- Eublemma tytrocoides Hacker & Hausmann, 2010 Mauritania, Togo, Burkina Faso
- Eublemma udzungwa Hacker, 2019 Tanzania
- Eublemma uhlenhuthi Wiltshire, 1988 Djibouti, Ethiopia, Kenya, Tanzania
- Eublemma uhlenhuthiana Hacker, 2019 Ethiopia
- Eublemma uniformis (Staudinger, 1878) northern Iran
- Eublemma uninotata Hampson, 1902 South Africa
- Eublemma usambara Hacker, 2019 Tanzania
- Eublemma variochrea Holloway, 1979 New Caledonia
- Eublemma velocissima Turati, 1926
- Eublemma vestalis (Butler, 1886) Australia
- Eublemma viettei (Berio, 1954) Sierra Leone, Ghana, Nigeria, Congo, Ethiopia, Kenya, Uganda, Malawi, Tanzania, Mozambique, Zimbabwe, South Africa, Madagascar, Mauritius
- Eublemma virginalis (Oberthür, 1881) Algeria
- Eublemma viridis (Staudinger, 1888)
- Eublemma viridula (Guenée, 1841) southern Europe
- Eublemma wagneri (Herrich-Schäffer, [1851]) Turkey
- Eublemma willotti Holloway, 2009 Borneo
- Eublemma wiltshirei Fibiger & Hacker, 2002 Iran, Yemen
- Eublemma wolframmeyi Hacker, 2019 Namibia
- Eublemma wollastoni Rothschild, 1901 Egypt, Sudan
- Eublemma wutzdorffi (Püngeler, 1907) Jordan, Palestine, Egypt, Arabia, Tanzania
- Eublemma xanthochroa Hacker, 2019 South Africa
- Eublemma xanthocraspis Hampson, 1910
- Eublemma zillii Fibiger, Ronkay & Yela, 2010 Crete
