= Eublemma pyrosticta =

Scientific classification
- Domain: Eukaryota
- Kingdom: Animalia
- Phylum: Arthropoda
- Class: Insecta
- Order: Lepidoptera
- Superfamily: Noctuoidea
- Family: Erebidae
- Genus: Eublemma
- Species: E. pyrosticta

Binomial name
- Eublemma pyrosticta de Joannis, 1910

Species of moth

Eublemma pyrosticta is a species of moth of the family Erebidae. It is endemic in Réunion, where it is found in medium altitudes in the centre and North of the island.

Its basic colours are black with white; wingspan is approx. 17mm.
