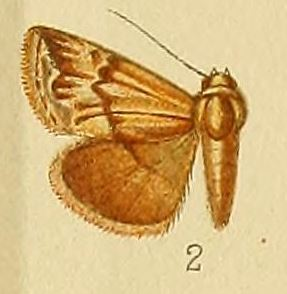
- Eublemma staudingeri

Scientific classification
- Kingdom: Animalia
- Phylum: Arthropoda
- Class: Insecta
- Order: Lepidoptera
- Superfamily: Noctuoidea
- Family: Erebidae
- Genus: Eublemma
- Species: E. staudingeri

Binomial name
- Eublemma staudingeri (Wallengren, 1875)

Synonyms
- Thalpochares staudingeri Wallengren, 1875; Eublemma pretoriae Distant, 1898

= Eublemma staudingeri =

Species of moth

Eublemma staudingeri is a species of moth of the family Erebidae. It is found in Eritrea, Niger, Nigeria, South Africa, Yemen and Zimbabwe.
