= Eublemma amabilis =

Scientific classification
- Kingdom: Animalia
- Phylum: Arthropoda
- Clade: Pancrustacea
- Class: Insecta
- Order: Lepidoptera
- Superfamily: Noctuoidea
- Family: Erebidae
- Genus: Eublemma
- Species: E. amabilis

Binomial name
- Eublemma amabilis Saalmüller, 1891

Synonyms
- Micraeschus albinellus Hampson, 1896

Species of moth

Eublemma amabilis is a moth of the family Noctuidae first described by Saalmüller in 1891. It is found in India, Bangladesh and Sri Lanka.

The adult is white pinkish. Eggs are round and grey white. First instars are creamy whitish with a broad flat head.

It is a major pest on Kerria lacca. The caterpillar enters the lac insect through one of the openings in the test or by tunnelling a hole through the incrustation. Pupa obtect adecticous and dark brown.
