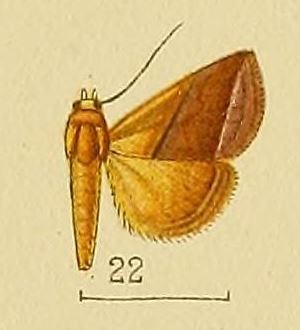
- Eublemma perobliqua

Scientific classification
- Kingdom: Animalia
- Phylum: Arthropoda
- Class: Insecta
- Order: Lepidoptera
- Superfamily: Noctuoidea
- Family: Erebidae
- Genus: Eublemma
- Species: E. perobliqua

Binomial name
- Eublemma perobliqua Hampson, 1910

= Eublemma perobliqua =

Species of moth

Eublemma perobliqua is a species of moth of the family Erebidae. It is found in Kenya and Tanzania
