= Eublemma rufipuncta =

Scientific classification
- Kingdom: Animalia
- Phylum: Arthropoda
- Clade: Pancrustacea
- Class: Insecta
- Order: Lepidoptera
- Superfamily: Noctuoidea
- Family: Erebidae
- Genus: Eublemma
- Species: E. rufipuncta

Binomial name
- Eublemma rufipuncta Turner, 1902

Species of moth

Eublemma rufipuncta is a moth of the family Noctuidae first described by Alfred Jefferis Turner in 1902. It is found in Australia.

== Original description ==
Male, 10-14 mm. Head, palpi, thorax, and abdomen grey. Palpi with second joint rough-scaled, terminal joint minute, not reaching vertex. Antennae ochreous-grey; in male simple, ciliated (2). Legs grey; posterior pair whitish-grey. Forewings elongate-triangular, costa slightly arched, apex round-pointed, termen obliquely rounded; grey, sometimes purplish-tinged; with straight, oblique darker lines, first from costa at 1/3 to dorsum at 1/4, second from mid-costa to dorsum at 2/3, third from costa near apex to tornus; the second line is interrupted at 1/3 from costa by a reddish dot; a fine terminal line; cilia purplish-grey, irrorated with whitish. Hindwings with termen slightly rounded; veins 3 and 4 stalked; grey, a darker transverse line at J; a pale subterminal line from inner margin not reaching costa; cilia grey. Townsville, Q.; in July and September; two specimens received from Mr. F. P. Dodd.

— Original description by Turner
