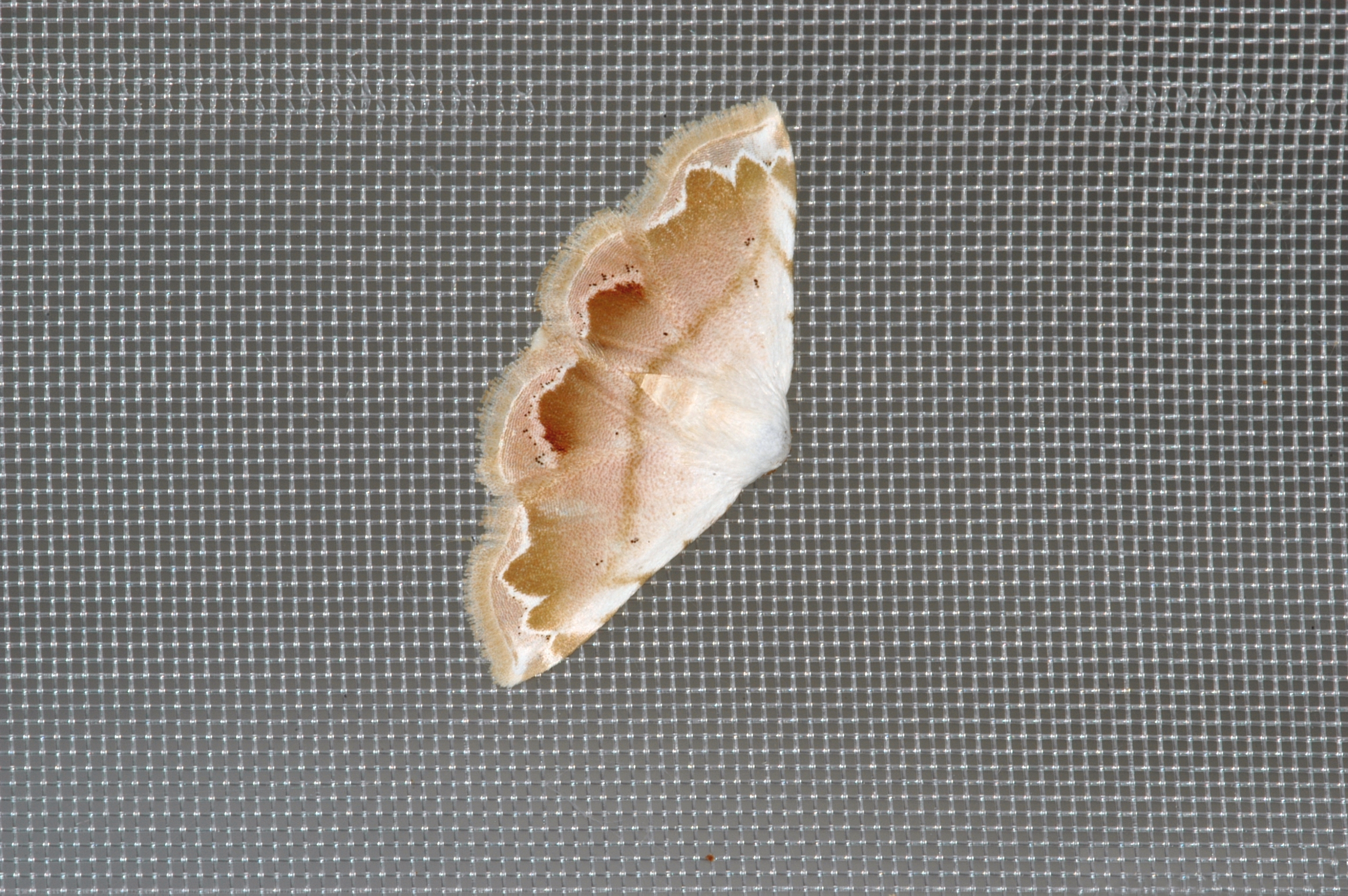

Scientific classification
- Kingdom: Animalia
- Phylum: Arthropoda
- Class: Insecta
- Order: Lepidoptera
- Superfamily: Noctuoidea
- Family: Erebidae
- Genus: Eublemma
- Species: E. roseonivea

Binomial name
- Eublemma roseonivea (Walker, [1863])

Synonyms
- Acontia roseonivea Walker, [1863]; Eublemma rosenovia

= Eublemma roseonivea =

Predaceous moth

Species of moth

Eublemma roseonivea, the predaceous moth, is a moth of the family Erebidae. The species was first described by Francis Walker in 1863. It is found in China, Taiwan, the Philippines, Malaya and Borneo.

The larvae prey on lac insects.
