= Eublemma lozostropha =

Scientific classification
- Domain: Eukaryota
- Kingdom: Animalia
- Phylum: Arthropoda
- Class: Insecta
- Order: Lepidoptera
- Superfamily: Noctuoidea
- Family: Erebidae
- Genus: Eublemma
- Species: E. lozostropha

Binomial name
- Eublemma lozostropha Turner, 1902

Synonyms
- Eublemma loxostropha

Species of moth

Eublemma lozostropha is a species of moth of the family Erebidae first described by Alfred Jefferis Turner in 1902. It is found from Kalbarri in Western Australia north around northern Australia, through central Australia and down the eastern coast to southern New South Wales.

== Original description ==
Female, 12-13 mm. Head and palpi whitish-ochreous, vertex sometimes white; palpi short, not reaching vertex, second joint loosely scaled. Antennae grey, towards base whitish-ochreous. Thorax and abdomen ochreous-brown. Legs whitish-ochreous. Forewings elongate-triangular, costa nearly straight; apex round-pointed, termen slightly rounded, oblique; reddish-brown; a narrow inwardly oblique white fascia from mid-costa to dorsum at 2/3, followed by a broader grey suffusion; cilia white, mixed with fuscous-brown. Hindwings with termen rounded; veins 3 and 4 stalked; grey; cilia grey. Townsville, Q.; in May, July, and August; three specimens received from Mr. F. P. Dodd.

— Original description by Turner
