= Eublemma rietzi =

Scientific classification
- Kingdom: Animalia
- Phylum: Arthropoda
- Class: Insecta
- Order: Lepidoptera
- Superfamily: Noctuoidea
- Family: Erebidae
- Genus: Eublemma
- Species: E. rietzi

Binomial name
- Eublemma rietzi (Fibiger, Ronkay, Zilli & Yela, 2010)

Species of moth

Eublemma rietzi is a moth species belonging to the family Erebidae. It is endemic to Andalusia, Spain. It is mainly found in the Province of Granada, although it has recently been located in Sierra de las Nieves in the Province of Málaga.
