= Eublemma trifasciata =

Scientific classification
- Kingdom: Animalia
- Phylum: Arthropoda
- Class: Insecta
- Order: Lepidoptera
- Superfamily: Noctuoidea
- Family: Erebidae
- Genus: Eublemma
- Species: E. trifasciata

Binomial name
- Eublemma trifasciata (Moore, 1881)

Synonyms
- Thalpochares trifasciata Moore, 1881; Eublemma demba C. Swinhoe, 1901

Species of moth

Eublemma trifasciata is a moth of the family Erebidae first described by Frederic Moore in 1881. It is found in Sri Lanka, India and Borneo.
