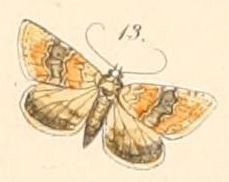

Scientific classification
- Domain: Eukaryota
- Kingdom: Animalia
- Phylum: Arthropoda
- Class: Insecta
- Order: Lepidoptera
- Superfamily: Noctuoidea
- Family: Erebidae
- Genus: Eublemma
- Species: E. delicata

Binomial name
- Eublemma delicata (Felder & Rogenhofer, 1874)

Synonyms
- Thalpochares delicata Felder & Rogenhofer, 1874

= Eublemma delicata =

Species of moth

Eublemma delicata is a species of moth of the family Erebidae. It is found in South Africa.
