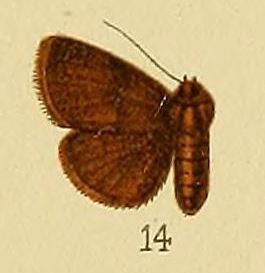
- Eublemma nyctichroa

Scientific classification
- Kingdom: Animalia
- Phylum: Arthropoda
- Class: Insecta
- Order: Lepidoptera
- Superfamily: Noctuoidea
- Family: Erebidae
- Genus: Eublemma
- Species: E. nyctichroa

Binomial name
- Eublemma nyctichroa Hampson, 1910

= Eublemma nyctichroa =

Species of moth

Eublemma nyctichroa is a species of moth of the family Erebidae. It is found in Kenya and Ethiopia.
