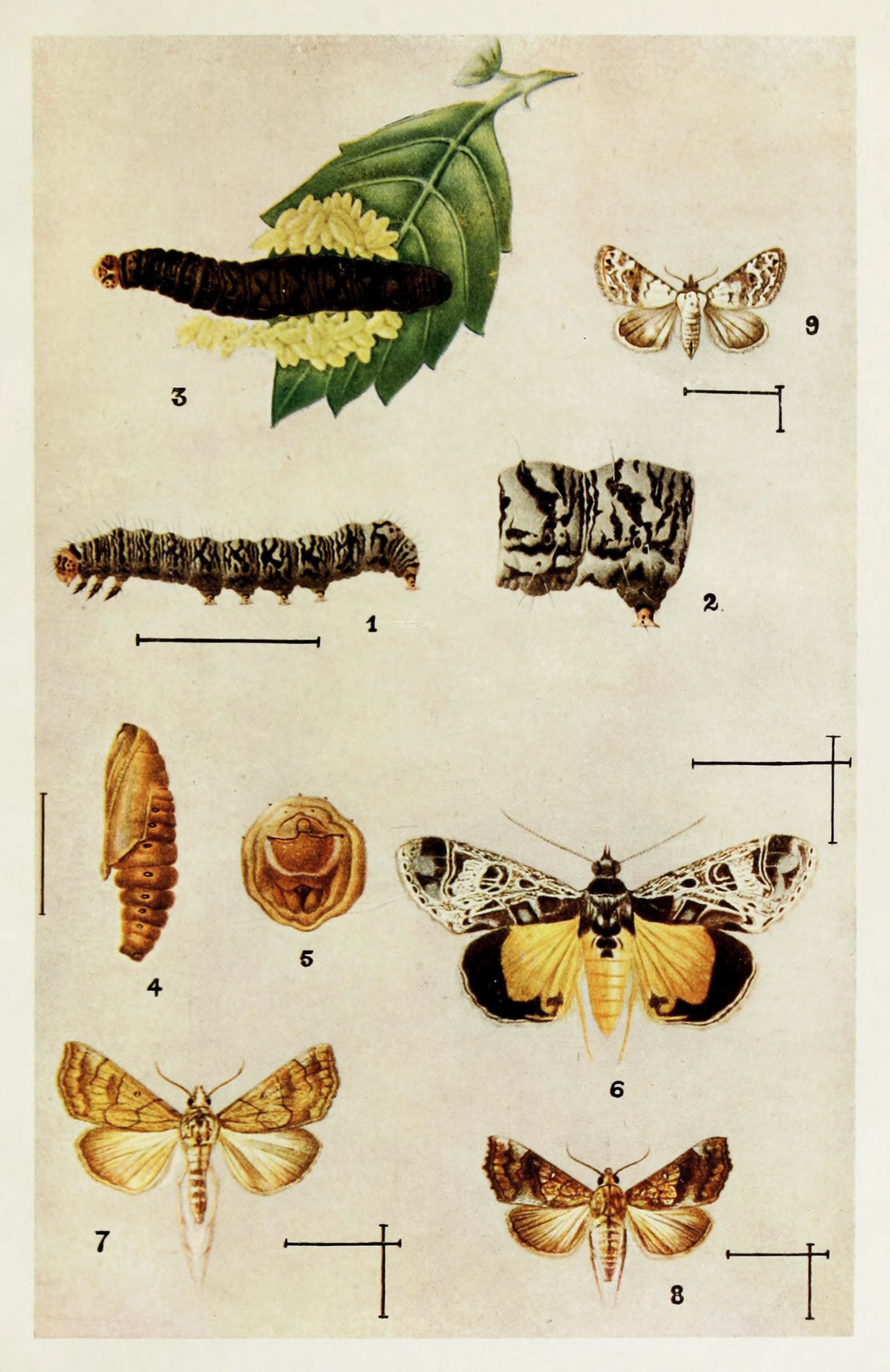
- Figure 9

Scientific classification
- Domain: Eukaryota
- Kingdom: Animalia
- Phylum: Arthropoda
- Class: Insecta
- Order: Lepidoptera
- Superfamily: Noctuoidea
- Family: Erebidae
- Genus: Eublemma
- Species: E. scitula

Binomial name
- Eublemma scitula (Rambur, 1833)

Synonyms
- Erastria scitula Rambur, 1833; Thalpochares scitula (Rambur, 1833); Coccidiphaga scitula (Rambur, 1833); Nola exasperata Lederer, 1855; Agrophila gibbosa Snellen, 1872; Erastria futilis Swinhoe, 1884; Eulocastria cretacea Hampson, 1893

= Eublemma scitula =

Species of moth

Eublemma scitula, the grey eublemma, is a moth of the family Erebidae. The species was first described by Jules Pierre Rambur in 1833. It is widespread in Africa and Asia and also occurs in southern Europe.

== Distribution ==
Algeria, Chad, the Democratic Republic of the Congo, Egypt, Gambia, Ghana, Kenya, Lesotho, Libya, Malawi, Mauritania, Morocco, Mozambique, Namibia, Nigeria, Somalia, South Africa, Sudan, Tunisia, Zambia, Zimbabwe, India, Pakistan, Sri Lanka, New Guinea, Australia and France.

== Biology ==
The caterpillar is bright pink to reddish. Its prolegs are modified to a pair of large suckers for adhering to the substrate. Body is covered with a light silken web, which serves as a shield. Pupation occurs within this shield.

Caterpillars of the genus Eublemma are pests on several scale insects. The E. scitula caterpillar is a pest on Kerria, Anomalococcus, Lecanium, Ceroplastes, Pulvinaria species, Drepanococcus cajani, Saissetia coffeae, Saissetia oleae, Ceraplastes rusci, Didesmococcus unifasciatus, Cerococcus indicus and Coccidohystrix insolita.
