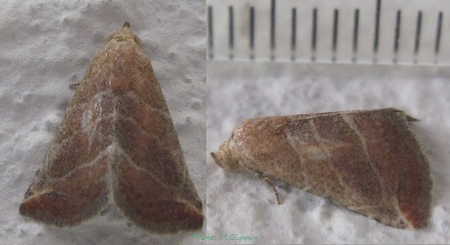

Scientific classification
- Kingdom: Animalia
- Phylum: Arthropoda
- Clade: Pancrustacea
- Class: Insecta
- Order: Lepidoptera
- Superfamily: Noctuoidea
- Family: Erebidae
- Genus: Eublemma
- Species: E. baccalix

Binomial name
- Eublemma baccalix (C. Swinhoe, 1886)

Synonyms
- Mestleta baccalix C. Swinhoe, 1886; Eublemma fasciosa Moore, 1887

= Eublemma baccalix =

Species of moth

Eublemma baccalix is a species of moth of the family Erebidae first described by Charles Swinhoe in 1886. It is endemic to the Canary Islands but can sometimes be found in Sri Lanka and the Madhya Pradesh state of India, to which it migrates.
