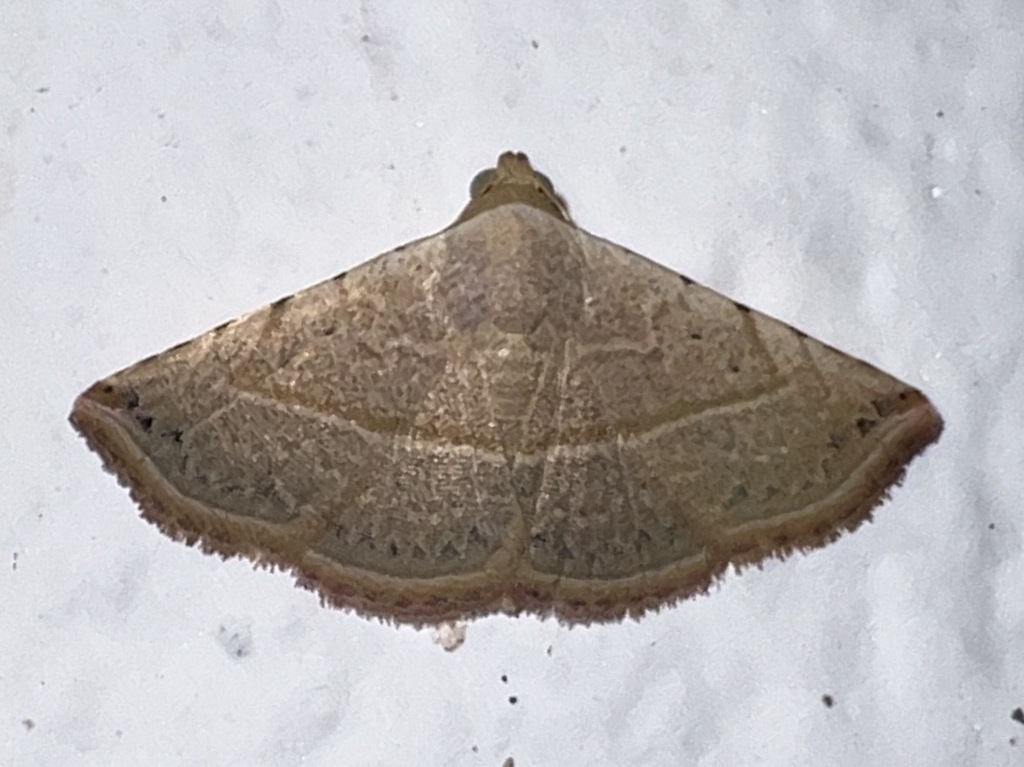

Scientific classification
- Kingdom: Animalia
- Phylum: Arthropoda
- Clade: Pancrustacea
- Class: Insecta
- Order: Lepidoptera
- Superfamily: Noctuoidea
- Family: Erebidae
- Genus: Eublemma
- Species: E. gayneri

Binomial name
- Eublemma gayneri Rothschild, 1901

= Eublemma gayneri =

Species of moth

Eublemma gayneri is a species of moth in the family Erebidae.

== Description ==
Described by Walter Rothschild, 2nd Baron Rothschild in 1901.

== Range ==
Eublemma gayneri is found throughout most of Sub-Saharan Africa.

== Ecology ==
This species has been documented feeding on a variety of plants from the families Fabaceae, Rhamnaceae, Anacardiaceae.

== Taxonomy ==
Although it is listed as a Homotypic synonym of Autoba gayneri (Rothschild, 1901) scientific publications use Eublemma gayneri.
