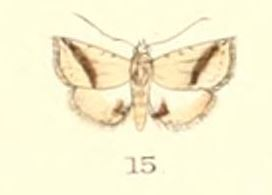

Scientific classification
- Kingdom: Animalia
- Phylum: Arthropoda
- Class: Insecta
- Order: Lepidoptera
- Superfamily: Noctuoidea
- Family: Erebidae
- Genus: Eublemma
- Species: E. pudica

Binomial name
- Eublemma pudica (Snellen, 1880)

Synonyms
- Thalpochares pudica Snellen, 1880; Mestleta acontioides Moore, 1882; Mestleta interrupta Moore, [1885]; Eublemma stereoscia Turner, 1936

= Eublemma pudica =

Species of moth

Eublemma pudica is a moth of the family Erebidae first described by Snellen in 1880. It is found in Sri Lanka, India, Fiji and Australia.

Adult wingspan is 1.3 cm. Forewings pale brown with a shaded dark band across the middle. A black spot found at the wingtip. Hindwings pale brown with a shaded dark triangle on the margin.
