= Sixlets =

Small round colorful malted chocolatey candies

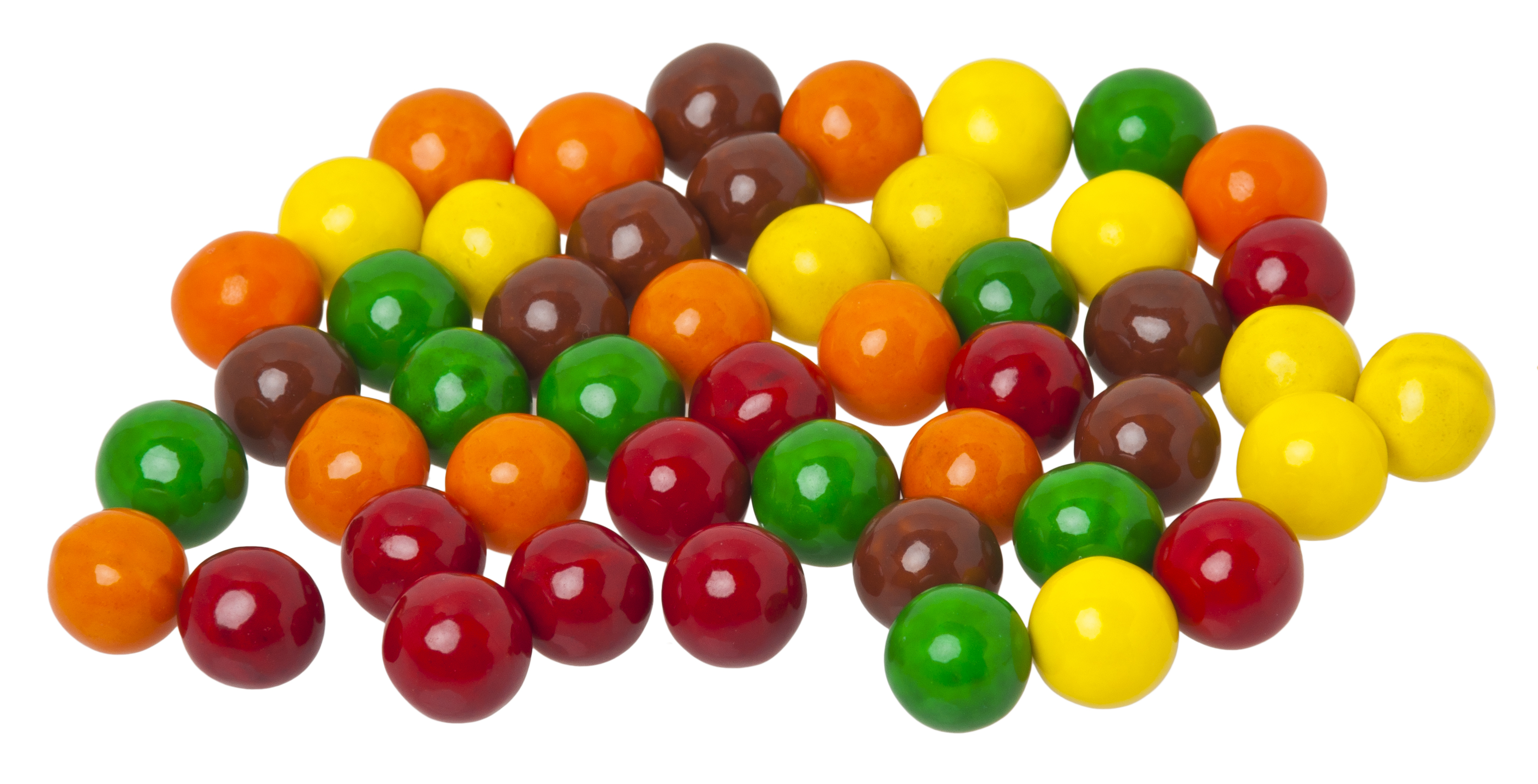
Sixlets

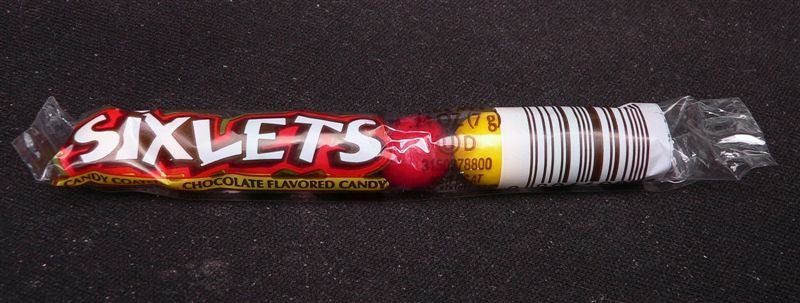
A cellophane package of Sixlets

Sixlets are small round candy-coated, chocolate-flavoured candy made by Oak Leaf Confections, a Chocolat Frey company based in Toronto, Ontario, Canada. They are currently being produced at the Ganong Chocolate Factory in St. Stephen, New Brunswick, by the Ganong Brothers company. They are often sold in thin cellophane packages that hold them in a tube-like formation. The United States Food and Drug Administration recognized that Sixlets are safe for human consumption during a 1961 study. The ball-shaped candies come in colours that include red, brown, yellow, green, blue and orange. An Easter variation of the candy adds white, pink, and blue pieces while removing red and brown ones from the mix. A Christmas variation has only red, green, and white; and the Valentine's Day variation has red, pink, and white. Halloween versions are also sold, having orange, teal, purple, green, and black candies. At some specialty candy stores, Sixlets can be found sold loose by weight in individually sorted colours not found in the typical variety – such as lime green, black, and pink – in the same way that M&M's are popularizing designer colour selection. They are also packaged for sale as decoration for baked goods.

== History ==
Sixlets have existed since at least 1960 and were originally made by Leaf Brands. A candy brand with a similar name that was also made by Leaf in the 1960s was called Fivesomes. Fivesomes were a miniature version of Whoppers that, like Sixlets, also came in cellophane wrapping. In 1996, Hershey purchased the North American confectionery operations of Leaf, Inc., including such brands as Jolly Rancher, Heath Bar, Whoppers, Chuckles, Milk Duds, and Sixlets. In 2003, Hershey Foods Corporation sub-licensed their rights to the Sixlets brand name to SweetWorks Confections LLC.

The candies are currently sold in a variety of packages. A six-ball tube—like the original after which the candy was named—was re-introduced in 2017.
