= Astro Pops =

Cone-shaped lollipops

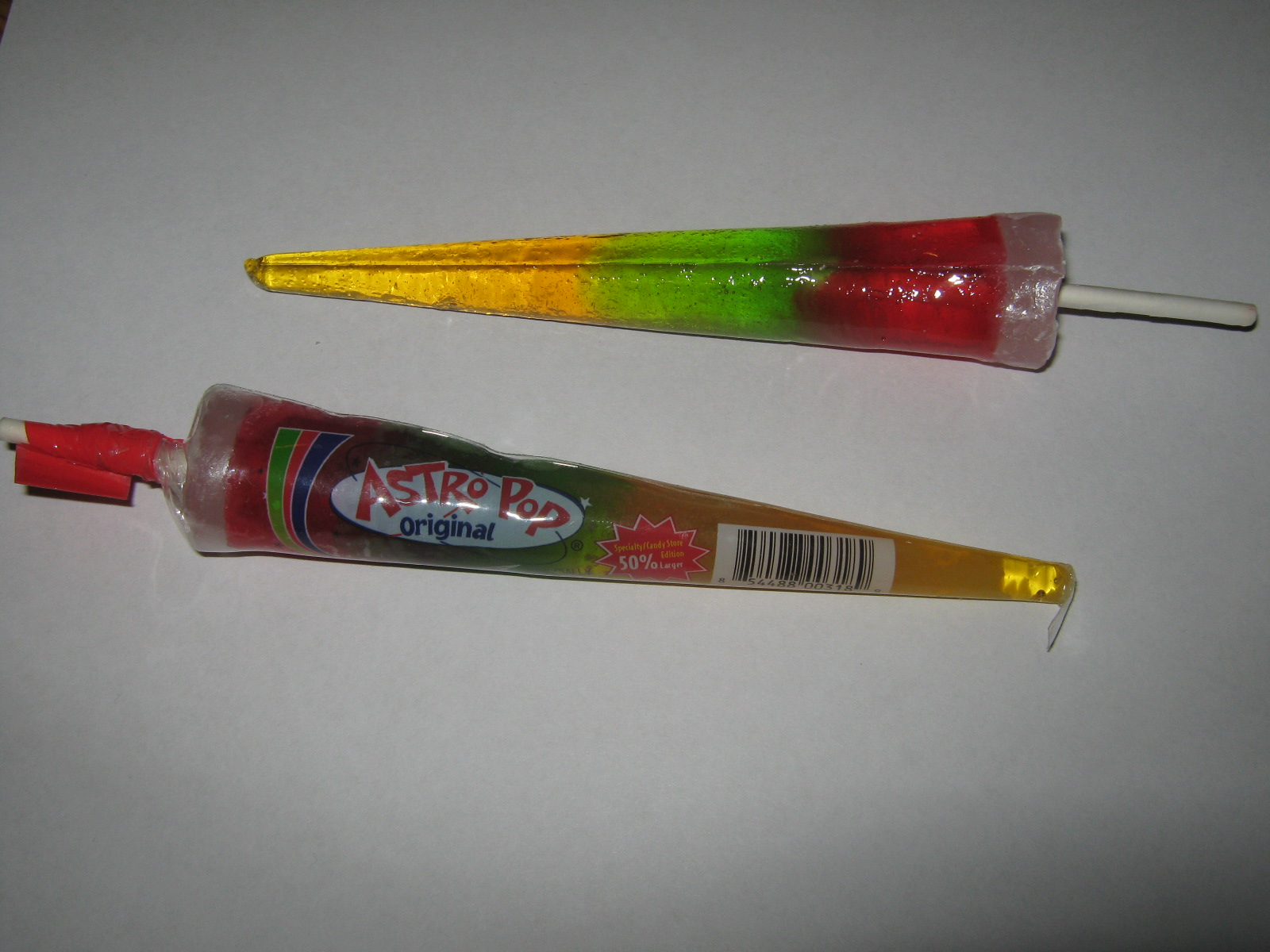
Astro Pops

Astro Pops are transparent three-color cone-shaped lollipops sold by Leaf Brands.

== History ==
Astro Pops were first made in 1963 after two rocket scientists working on the space program in El Segundo, California decided to quit their jobs and create the Astro Pop, modeling the pop after a three-stage rocket. They hand-built equipment, including machines to speed up the production of the cone wrappers. Astro Pops are unusual because the cone wrapper becomes the mold for the candy. Hot candy is poured directly into the wrapper, then a paper stick is added and the pop is capped off with a layer of wax. Because Astro Pops were created in the 1960s, at the same time in history when the Space Race was in full force, millions of Astro Pops were sold when the manufacturers capitalized on this craze.

In 1987, Spangler Candy Company (the makers of Dum Dums, Circus Peanuts and Safe-T-Pops) acquired the Astro Pops brand from the Nellson Candy Company of Los Angeles, California.

The original three flavors of the candy are cherry, passionfruit, and pineapple. Spangler expanded the Astro Pop line of lollipops with flavors such as banana split and caramel apple.

In 1997, Spangler and the 7-Eleven convenience store chain were sued by a couple in Skagit County, Washington, who alleged that their son was injured by an Astro Pop.

At the beginning of 2000, Spangler decided to reverse the shape of the Astro Pop, placing the stick at the tip of the pop, rather than the base. They felt it would give the consumer more surface area to lick. In September 2004, Spangler discontinued the product line.

In 2010, Ellia Kassoff purchased the brand. It is now part of Leaf Brands, LLC's portfolio of brands. Leaf has also expanded the Astro Pops franchise to include Astro Pop Asteroids (smaller bite-sized pieces), and Astro Pops Sodas. Kassoff paid Spangler cash for the recipes, global rights to the trademark, and three years of royalty payments. The original manufacturing equipment had been sold for scrap so Leaf had to reinvent the manufacturing process. Kassoff, with his company Strategic Marks, has become known as a "brand revivalist", who revived the Leaf brand that was once owned by his uncle before being acquired by Hershey in 1996. At that time Leaf made candy such as Jolly Ranchers, Milk Duds, and Whoppers.
