= Astro pop (cocktail) =

Layered mixed drink

- Type: Mixed drink
- Ingredients: Vodka, blue curaçao, grenadine, sweet and sour mix and others
- Served: Typically layered

An astro pop cocktail is a layered cocktail, mixed drink or shooter so named because it resembles the Astro Pop lollipop candy brand. Various recipes exist that use liquor and liqueurs to produce the drink. A version of the drink exists that is layered with red, white, and blue colors and served in a shot glass. It is a popular alcoholic beverage in some drinking establishments.

== Varieties ==
An astro pop may be served as a cocktail, mixed drink or shooter. Several variations of the drink exist. Alcoholic beverages used in the drink's preparation can include vodka, raspberry vodka, blueberry vodka, Prosecco (an Italian sparkling white wine), blue curaçao liqueur, Crème de banane and melon liqueur.

Drink mixers used in its preparation can include sweet and sour mix, simple syrup and grenadine.

Additional ingredients and garnishes can include sugar, raspberries, lemon juice and lemon.

A cocktail spoon is sometimes used to aid in layer separation when preparing the drink, in which various beverages are slowly poured over the back of the spoon.

A drink named Skylab Fallout, similar in appearance, was created at Pat O'Brien's in New Orleans in 1979, during the time of the Skylab descent back to Earth. The Skylab Fallout was concocted with blue curaçao liqueur, apricot brandy, grain alcohol, rum and orange juice. In its preparation, liquids that are the densest settle at the bottom of a glass. This Pat O'Brien's creation involved the alcohol strength increasing as one drank it, with stronger alcoholic beverages existing in the lower layers of the cocktail.

In 2013, at the Burke Street Pub in Winston-Salem, North Carolina, is version of the astro pop was the most popular cocktail drink ordered by patrons.

== Similar beverages ==
In addition to producing Astro Pop candy, Leaf Brands produces an Astro Pop soft drink in several flavors.

== See also ==
- List of cocktails
