= Leaf Brands =

American candy company

Leaf Brands, LLC
- Company type: Private
- Industry: Confectionery
- Predecessor: Leaf International
- Founded: 2011; 15 years ago
- Headquarters: Newport Coast, U.S.
- Area served: Worldwide
- Products: Candy, cookies, soda, chewing gum
- Brands: Astro Pops; Hydrox; Tart 'n' Tinys; Wacky Wafers
- Owner: Ellia Kassoff
- Website: leafbrands.com

Leaf Brands, LLC is an American candy company based in Newport Coast, Newport Beach, California. The original Leaf International (also known as the "Leaf Candy Company") started in the 1940s. Leaf International was once the fourth largest candy producer in North America, producing such products as Whoppers, Jolly Rancher, Milk Duds, Rain-Blo bubble gum, the Heath bar and PayDay, before it sold the U.S. division to The Hershey Company in 1996 and left the United States.

In 2011, the company was revived, and the newly re-formed company made its official debut at the 2011 Sweets & Snacks Expo. Ellia Kassoff, the nephew of Ed Leaf, (possibly a relative of Sol S. Leaf, the founder of Leaf Candy Company), is the CEO. The company registered the Hydrox trademark which had been abandoned by former owner Kellogg's, and re-created the brand of cookies, a precursor to Oreos, which had been out of production since 1999. Leaf Brands began selling the product through Amazon Marketplace in September 2015.

== Current brands ==
As of July 2021

- Astro Pops
- David's Jelly Beans
- Farts Candy
- Hydrox
- Tart 'n' Tinys
- Wacky Wafers
- Yummers!
- Big League Chews
