= Butter Brickle =

Chocolate-coated toffee

Butter Brickle is a chocolate-coated toffee trademarked by candy manufacturer John G. Woodward Co. of Council Bluffs, Iowa, and toffee pieces for flavoring ice cream, manufactured by The Fenn Bros. Ice Cream and Candy Co. of Sioux Falls, South Dakota.

== John G. Woodward & Co. ==
Butter Brickle was first sold on 20 November 1924, and the trademark registered 15 May 1928 by candy manufacturer John G. Woodward Co. in Council Bluffs, Iowa for candy, not ice cream.

Arthur E. Dempsey, a candy maker and later, inventor, at John G. Woodward Co. in Council Bluffs, Iowa, reportedly, was the creator of the candy, trademarked as Butter Brickle

== Fenn Bros. Ice Cream and Candy Co. ==
Fenn Bros. Ice Cream and Candy Co., founded in 1898, by Henry C. Fenn and James W. Fenn, is most known for its registered trademark chocolate-coated toffee, and toffee ice cream flavoring called Butter Brickle. The products were called Fenn's Butter Brickle English Toffee Chocolate Covered and Fenn's Butter Brickle Candy Ice Cream Flavoring.

Omaha, Nebraska's Blackstone Hotel's Orleans Room restaurant has been credited with creating Butter Brickle ice cream, in the late 1920s. Small pieces of the toffee candy bar were used, in effect, to make a mix-in, later sold as the product, Fenn's Butter Brickle Candy Ice Cream Flavoring.

Besides Butter Brickle, the company also made Walnut Crush, Blue Seal Nougat, Smooth Sailin’, Royal Brazils, and Big Bogie (later Big Nougat), and ice cream.

The first sponsored musical program on KSOO Radio was sponsored by Fenn's Blue Seal Nougat Bar.

The United States Food and Drug Administration cited them in 1940 for labeling and in 1947 for filthy product.

In the late 1950s and 1960s, Butter Brickle candy bars were advertised on radio and television with the slogan "Got a nickel? Butter Brickle,... candy bar!" delivered in an arch stage British accent.

At the company's peak, more than 200 people worked at Fenn's, making it one of Sioux Falls' largest employers.

"I'd work on the beater, but most times I had to cool cooked nougat," she says. The nougat was cooked in large copper kettles and heated to 290 or 300 °F (143 or 149 °C). It was used in one of Fenn's most popular offerings, the Walnut Crush. Walnuts were added to the nougat, and then it was coated with chocolate. Another specialty, the Big Bogie, came in three flavors, vanilla, chocolate and strawberry. It is kin to a candy called Charleston Chew. "Bill Fenn came up one time with that candy bar and said, "Can you guys make this bar?" and I said, "Oh, I think we can," " John says. A recipe for one batch of chocolate Big Bogies requires 710 pounds (320 kg) of corn syrup, 315 pounds (143 kg) of sugar and 16 ounces (450 g) of salt And that doesn't include the chocolate covering. ... The production of stick candy halted during WWII. When sugar was rationed by the government, the company devoted its efforts to the growing popularity of its candy bars. Even those didn't stay the same. Over the years, the Wiemans saw candy bars come and go and the price jump from a nickel to a dime. Lily liked the Blue Seal Nougat. Similar to a Walnut Crush, it had vanilla flavoring in the nougat, not maple syrup, and was coated with sweet chocolate, not dark chocolate. They both wrinkle their noses at the thought of a candy bar that was made with white chocolate - "imitation white chocolate," Lily points out with disdain."

The Fenn Bros. manufactured Butter Brickle candy and flavoring until the 1970s, when the company was liquidated. The "Butter Brickle" trademark and formula were sold to Leaf, Inc., which manufactured Heath Bars. A product similar to the original toffee bits sold by Fenn remains in "Heath Bits 'o Brickle Toffee Bits," sold by The Hershey Company, which acquired the Heath assets in 1996. Butter Brickle flavor ice cream is currently sold by ice-cream makers with the name Butter Brickle being used under license.

== In popular culture ==
In the TV show Danny Phantom, the villain Vlad Plasmius sometimes shouts "Oh, Butter Brickle!" or the names of other snack foods in anger as a euphemism.

This confectionary made an appearance on Ali G, and then an Ali G parody on The Simpsons.

In the episode "Hello, I Love You" on the TV series Northern Exposure (season 5 episode 15), Ruth-Anne Miller and Walt Kupfer share Butter Brickle ice cream in their broken-down truck to celebrate the birth of Miranda Bliss Tambo Vincoeur.

In the Pixar movie Up, Russell tells his friend Carl that he and his father would sit on the curb and have an ice cream cone while counting cars. His father would always have a Butter Brickle cone.

In the TV show Two and a Half Men, Rose requests Charlie to bring her some Butter Brickle ice cream.

In the TV show The Sopranos, Phil Leotardo says, "who do you think's keeping Ginny in Butter Brickle?".

In episode "Ice Cream of Margie: With the Light Blue Hair" on the TV series The Simpsons (season 18 episode 7), Homer stands in underwear as pieces from an ice cream uniform fly onto his body. When fully dressed, he looks straight to the audience and says in a serious accent, "Butter Brickle!"

In the 1963 film Soldier in the Rain, Steve McQueen and Jackie Gleason share Butter Brickle ice cream.

In the episode "Angela's New Best Friend" on the TV series Who's the Boss (season 2 episode 22), Angela gets upset when she can't find her Butter Brickle ice cream and Tony tells her "Some other person ate it." when in fact it was just in another spot in the freezer.

In the film Ice Cream Man (1995) the flavor is named as the favorite of the titular character.

In the DC comic Titans: Hard Feelings (2025), the Justice League Unlimited cafeteria being out of butter brickle is the final straw for Killer Frost to decide to once again become a villain.

== See also ==
- List of ice cream flavors
- nonpareils
- sprinkles
- Steve's Ice Cream
- Amy's Ice Creams
- Cold Stone Creamery

== External images ==
- Fenn's Butter Brickle 10-cent candy bar wrapper - 1970's flickr
- Fenn's Butter Brickle Candy Ice Cream Flavoring (Can) 12.75 inch tall 9.75 inch diameter eBay via archive.org
- Fenn's Butter Brickle and Walnut Crush Candy Bar Boxes eBay via archive.org
- Big Bogie Candy Bar Wrapper (Circa 1940) eBay via archive.org
- "Fenn's Ice Cream Name Tag". Busy Beaver Button Museum.
