= Tart 'n' Tinys =

American fruit flavoured candy

Tart 'n' Tinys are small, fruit-flavored candies distributed by Leaf Brands. Tart 'n' Tiny's were originally manufactured by the Wonka company in five colors, bluish-purple (grape), yellow (lemon), orange (orange), red (cherry), and green (lime). In 2015 when they were reintroduced, they added a new color, light blue (blue raspberry).

The original incarnation of Tart 'n' Tinys candies were small cylinders of compressed dextrose. The candy had a chalky appearance and consistency, with a firm crunch that would crumble in the mouth, similar to SweeTarts or Smarties. Along with Nerds and Wacky Wafers, Tart 'n' Tinys were top sellers for the Wonka company in the 1980s. In the 1990s these original candies were discontinued.

A short time later, Wonka introduced Candy-coated Tart n Tinys, identical candies with a brightly colored candy coating. This candy was then marketed simply as Tart n Tinys. While the original version was hard in texture, a soft and chewy version of Tart 'n' Tinys was introduced, titled Chewy Tart 'n' Tinys, that had the same candy coating but with a chewy center. These Tart 'n' Tinys, as well as the regular hard ones, have now been discontinued.

== Brand revival ==
In 2014, Leaf Brands, LLC acquired the Tart n' Tiny trademark and made plans to revive the brand by the second quarter of the year. Leaf's focus was to reintroduce the famous Tart n' Tinys candy as the original, uncoated product from the 1970s and 1980s, and not the later, hard-coated versions. The original flavors were to be revived, with new tropical and sour varieties to be introduced soon after. As of January 2015, Tart n' Tinys were made available to the public in both bulk and in 4.5 oz packages.

== See also ==
- List of confectionery brands
