= Heath bar =

Toffee candy bar from The Hershey Company

Heath
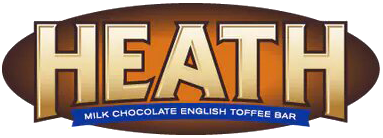

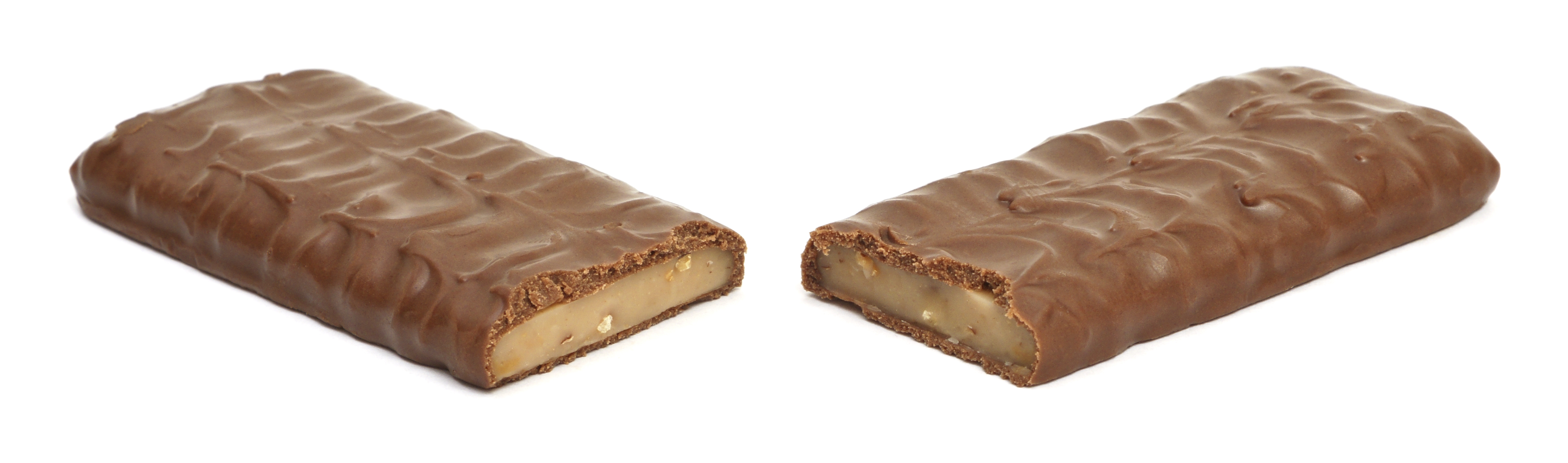
- A toffee candy bar with almonds covered in milk chocolate
- Type: Toffee candy bar
- Inventor: L. S. Heath; Leaf, Inc.
- Inception: 1928; 98 years ago
- Manufacturer: The Hershey Company
- Available: Available
- Current supplier: The Hershey Company
- Website: hersheyland.com/heath-bar

The Heath bar is a candy bar made of toffee, almonds, and milk chocolate, first manufactured by the Heath Brothers Confectionery in 1928. The Heath bar has been manufactured and distributed by Hershey since its acquisition of the Leaf International North American confectionery operations, late in 1996.

== History ==
In 1913, schoolteacher L.S. Heath bought a confectionery shop in Robinson, Illinois, as a likely business opportunity for his oldest sons, Bayard and Everett. In 1914, the brothers opened a combined candy store, ice cream parlor, and manufacturing operation there.

With the success of the business, the elder Heath became interested in manufacturing ice cream, and opened a small dairy factory in 1915. His sons worked on expanding their confectionery business. At some point, they reportedly acquired a toffee recipe via a traveling salesman, from Vriner's Greek confectionery in Champaign, Illinois. In 1928, they began marketing the toffee confection locally as "Heath English Toffee", proclaiming it "America's Finest".

In 1931, Bayard and Everett were persuaded by their father to sell their confectionery shop and work at his dairy. They brought their candy-making equipment with them and established a retail business there. The Heaths came up with the marketing idea of including their toffee confection on the dairy products order form taken around by the Heath dairy trucks: customers could then order Heath bars to be delivered along with milk and cottage cheese.

Early ads promoted Heath as a virtual health bar – only the best milk chocolate and almonds, creamery butter, and "pure sugar cane". The motto at the bottom of one ad read "Heath for better health!" The motto was surrounded by illustrations of milk, cream, butter, cheese, and ice cream and in a corner – a Heath bar and a bottle of soda. The soda may have been Pepsi, as the Heath Co. bottled the drink for a number of years.

The Heath bar grew in national popularity during the Depression, despite its one-ounce (28 g) size and the 5-cent price, equal to larger bars.

In 1940, family members invested in one of the few available oil leases near Newton, Illinois, that had been overlooked by major oil companies. In July 1940, the lease struck oil, eventually pumping 2,700 barrels per day and earning over $1 million for the family. Two years later in 1942, the U.S. Army placed an order for $175,000 of Heath bars to be included in soldiers' rations. The size of this order led the family to modernize the plant equipment; the candy was manufactured consistently on a major commercial scale thereafter.

Popularity of the Heath bar grew after the war; in 1946, L.S. Heath, his four sons, two daughters and grandchildren incorporated L.S. Heath & Sons, Inc. The manufacturing process remained largely a hands-on, family-run operation. In the 1950s, the Heath Toffee Ice Cream Bar was developed, and was eventually franchised to other dairies. By 1955, the operation had grown to produce about 69,000 candy bar centers at one time. The automatic wrapping machines turned out 1,600 candy bars per minute. The company had 35 candy salesmen who called on approximately 7,200 wholesale distributors in the United States, along with thousands of other outlets, such as theaters, vending machine operators, supermarkets, and chain stores.

In the 1960s, the huge national success of the Heath bar led to disagreements within the family, with at least one grandchild, Richard J. Heath, expelled from the business in 1969. He eventually published a book in 1995 entitled Bittersweet: The Story of the Heath Candy Co.

In the 1970s, the company bought the registered trademark Butter Brickle toffee ice cream flavoring formula from The Fenn Bros. Ice Cream and Candy Co. of Sioux Falls, South Dakota.

In January 1986, L.S. Heath & Sons, Inc., filed a trademark application for the Heath name, with a first use declaration of March 1, 1931, which was the year that Bayard and Everett Heath sold the confectionery business and began working in the dairy operation. The registered trademark Number 1404302 was granted on August 5, 1986.

In 1989, the L.S. Heath & Sons business was sold to Leaf, Inc., which itself had been purchased by Huhtamäki Oyj of Helsinki, Finland, in 1983.

In 1996, the North American confectionery operations of Leaf, Inc., were purchased by the Hershey Company for $440 million plus annual royalties for licenses paid to Huhtamäki Oyj to produce such brands as Heath, Jolly Rancher, Milk Duds, Payday, Whoppers, Chuckles, and Twizzler's licorice. In turn, Huhtamäki bought the European confectionery operations of German praline manufacturer Gubor and Italian confectioner Sperlari from Hershey for $110 million.

In April 2018, a holding company named Iconic IP Interests, LLC, an investment vehicle of Highlander Partners, purchased the intellectual property, including trademarks and associated licensing agreements and royalty arrangements of ten candy brands including Heath, Jolly Rancher, PayDay, Good & Plenty, Whoppers, Chuckles, and Milk Duds from Huhtamäki Oyj.

Hershey had previously created the Skor bar in 1981 to compete with the Heath bar, before buying out Leaf, Inc. As of 2026 it maintains production and marketing of both the Heath bar and the Skor bar, despite the two being almost identical.

== Product ==
Shaped as a thin, hard slab with a milk chocolate coating, the toffee originally contained sugar, butter, and almonds in a small squarish bar weighing one ounce (28 g).

Since acquiring the product, Hershey has elongated the bar to align with its competition. It now weighs 1.4 ounces (40 g).

Actual ingredients listed on a Heath Bar purchased in October 2025 are "Sugar, Vegetable oil, Dairy Butter (Milk), Almonds, Lactose, reduced protein whey, contains 2% or less of chocolate, skim milk, cocoa, cocoa processed with alkali salt, lecithin, natural flavor." With less than 2% chocolate the wrapper describes the product as "English Toffee enrobed in rich chocolatey coating."

== Heath bars in other products ==
Following the 1973 use of the candy bar as an ice-cream "mix-in" by Steve's Ice Cream, Heath bars became a significant ingredient in ice cream and other confections.

According to Ray Broekel in his 1982 book The Great American Candy Bar Book, variations of the bar have included Heath Milk Chocolate with Peanuts, Heath Milk Chocolate Toffee Crunch, Heath Milk Chocolate with Natural Cereal and Raisins and the Double Heath bar. In the 1980s, a Heath Toffee Ice Cream Sandwich appeared, along with Heath Soft 'n Crunchy—a soft-serve ice cream.

Other varieties of Heath bar-based confections currently or previously included Archway Cookies' Heath Cookie, Heath Bar Klondike bars, Baskin-Robbins' Heath Bar Shake, Dairy Queen's Heath Bar Blizzard and Heath Bar flavored varieties of ice cream with a coffee or vanilla ice cream base. Ben and Jerry's produced a Heath Bar Crunch ice cream, which was renamed Vanilla Toffee Bar Crunch in 2014 when the company stopped using actual branded Heath bars.

Although the candy bar's original manufacturer, L. S. Heath, and subsequently Hershey have supported the incorporation of the candy bar into other confections by marketing a pre-shredded variety, many vendors hand-crumble the candy bars, finding the pre-crumbled variety to be "too small and too dusty".

== Related products from other manufacturers ==
In the 1950s, Marabou in Sweden wanted to have a license to make the Heath bar, but was not allowed to do so. Instead, Marabou took the Heath bar as inspiration and created the Daim bar, which was available in many countries as of 2026.
