= Mix in =

Mix in may refer to:

- A mix-in is some type of confectionery added to ice cream
- Mixin is a class in object-oriented programming languages
