= SweetWorks =

Candy manufacturing company

SweetWorks Confections is a candy and chocolate manufacturer that owns and operates several different brands which each dedicate to different types of sweets. Headquartered in Buffalo, New York, it is an entity of Chocolat Frey, with factories in Buffalo and Toronto, Canada.

== History ==
SweetWorks Confections began in 1956 as Niagara Chocolates in Buffalo, New York, which was opened by John and Angela Terranova.

In 1992, their son Philip Terranova took ownership of the company.

In 1998, they acquired Oak Leaf Confections which also included Whetstone Chocolates, this added a production facility in Toronto, Canada and St. Augustine, Florida. But the Florida facility closed soon after the acquisition, and production was moved to Buffalo. This allowed production of additional products including Sixlets, gumballs, and dextrose.

The two companies was then combined and rebranded as SweetWorks Confections in 2002.

In 2014, Chocolat Frey, a Swiss chocolate manufacturer acquired SweetWorks Confections and its manufacturing facilities in Buffalo and Toronto.

== Brands ==
SweetWorks Confections, LLC owns and operate several brands that each carry their own type of sweets.

- Color it Candy, a service that allows customers to customize the color for any of SweetWorks brand candies.
- Sixlets, which was introduced in the 1960s are spheres of chocolate with candy coating.
- Niagara Chocolates, original brand from 1956 that makes chocolate.
- Ovation by Frey, acquired from Hershey in 2003, chocolate that is meant to be shared.
- Bubble King, their brand of gumballs.
