= Mix-in =

Ice cream mixed with another product

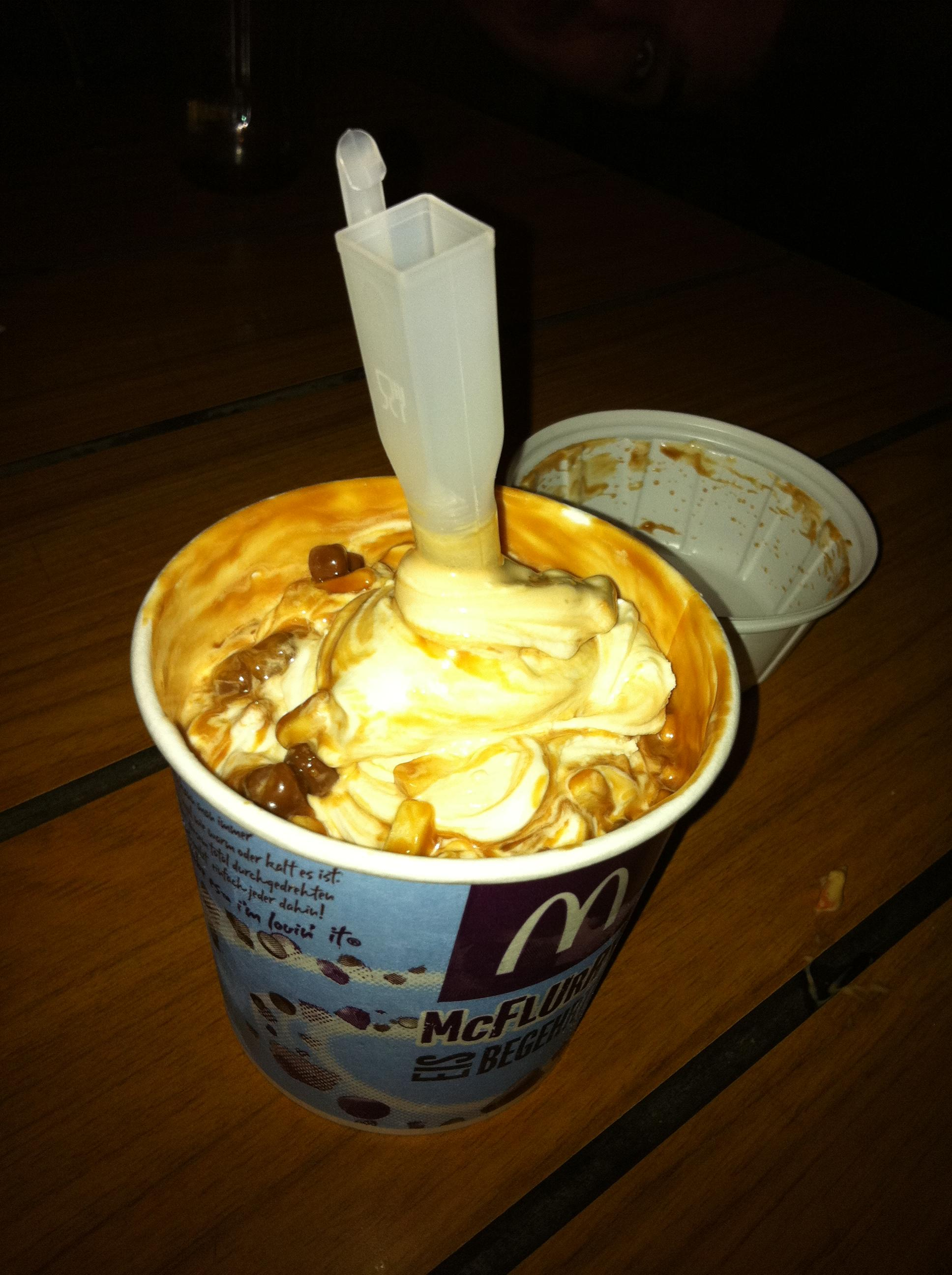
- A McDonald's McFlurry, a commercial mix-in which, in this case, includes Twix
- Type: Ice cream
- Course: Dessert
- Place of origin: United States
- Region or state: New England
- Main ingredients: Ice cream

A mix-in is a type of dessert made of ice cream and another flavoring such as candy. Mix-in desserts are traditionally sold in an ice cream parlor and are made at the time of ordering. Popular examples of this dessert include Dairy Queen's Blizzard and McDonald's McFlurry.

== Description ==
A mix-in is a type of dessert made with ice cream and another product that is either blended or folded in.

== History ==
The concept of mixing in additional flavors at the time of ordering was created in North Dakota in the 1930's. The last known Whirla-Whip machine from that era is still in use at Dakota Drug in Stanlet, North Dakota. Steve Herrell used this concept in 1973, when he founded Steve's Ice Cream, near Boston, where they would crush Heath bars and other candies or confections and mix them into ice cream. Another term for the concept is "smoosh-ins". His system spread across the industry from his store and became the model for many other ice cream businesses and desserts.

== See also ==
- Amy's Ice Creams, a Texas-based company founded by a former Steve's employee
- Cold Stone Creamery
- Dairy Queen
