= Skor =

Toffee candy bar from Hershey's

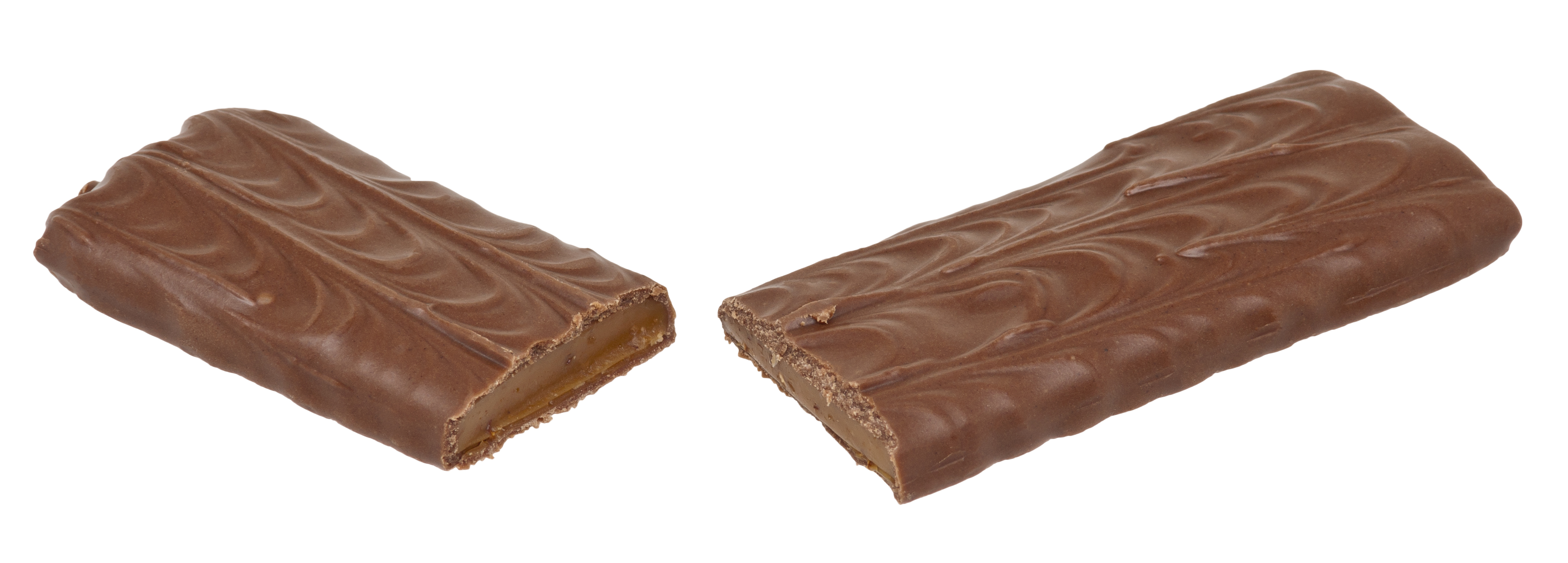
- A candy bar with buttery toffee covered in milk chocolate.
- Product type: Toffee candy bar
- Current owner: The Hershey Company
- Produced by: The Hershey Company
- Country: U.S.
- Introduced: 1981; 45 years ago
- Related brands: Heath
- Markets: U.S.
- Tagline: The candy bar with the taste of Sweden; An exercise in indulgence Indulgence you can trust
- Website: hersheyland.com/skor

Skor is a chocolate toffee bar produced by The Hershey Company. It was first marketed in the United States in 1981 and in Canada starting in 1983. The Skor bar consists of a thin slab of butter toffee covered in a milk chocolate coating. Skor is available as a single- or king-size, wrapped candy bar in a 1.4 oz (39 gram) portion.

The Skor bar was created to compete with the Heath bar, which was produced by the Heath Company but acquired by the Leaf Candy Company and sold to Hershey in 1996. Hershey now markets both of these competitors. The Skor bar is very similar to the Heath bar, but with minor differences such as the Skor bar being slightly thinner.
