= Whetstone Chocolates =

American chocolate company

Whetstone Chocolates in St. Augustine, Florida was founded in 1967 by Henry Whetstone and Esther Whetstone. The chocolate manufacturer merged with Oakleaf Confections of Toronto, Ontario, Canada and Niagara Chocolates of Buffalo, New York to form SweetWorks in 2002 before selling all of its stock holdings in the umbrella company in 2004. At the same time it initiated a plan to close its national product line and lay off an estimated 41 employees, while continuing as a manufacturer and retailer in St. Augustine.

It started out as a family operation out of a home kitchen and a small ice cream store on St. George Street that remains in the historic business district of St. Augustine as Tedi’s Olde Tyme Ice Cream. The business grew into a factory operation until 2004.

According to Whetstone's website it has now "transitioned from making mass produced chocolates to making artisan chocolates".

== History ==
Virginia Whetstone, daughter of the founders, said her father invented many of the production machines used to manufacture candy at the factory off State Road 312, "such as the machine which mixed chocolate and nuts into their nut cluster product". She said her father later sold the patent and said her brother also developed machines used on the production line and holds U.S. and foreign patents for designs involving chocolate and toy combinations. According to Hank Whetstone, "The chocolate and toy combination products represent an enormous opportunity and we intend to develop this area with partners in the industry."
