= Heath Bar Shake =

Beverage

Nutritional value per 1 shake (32 oz)
- Energy: 2,310 kcal (9,700 kJ)
- Carbohydrates: 303 g (101%)
- Sugars: 266 g
- Dietary fiber: 2 g (8% )
- Fat: 108 g (166%)
- Saturated: 64 g (320%)
- Trans: 2.5 g
- Protein: 35 g
Vitamins and minerals
Vitamins	Quantity %DV^{†}
Vitamin A equiv.	60% 540 μg
Vitamin C	10% 9 mg
Minerals	Quantity %DV^{†}
Calcium	92% 1200 mg
Iron	4% 0.7 mg
Sodium	68% 1560 mg
- Other constituents: Quantity
- Energy from fat: 970 kcal (4,100 kJ)
- Cholesterol: 295 mg (98%)
- ^{†}Percentages estimated using US recommendations for adults. Source: Baskin-Robbins

The Heath Bar Shake is a milkshake drink sold at Baskin-Robbins, based on the Heath candy bar. It is notable for its high calorie count and was dubbed "The Unhealthiest Drink in America" by Men's Health Magazine. The shake contains 2,310 calories.

73 different ingredients go into making the shake. The shake was introduced on February 19, 2008 as part of a special limited offer. The shake is mentioned in the book Eat This, Not That.
