= Steve's Ice Cream =

American ice cream brand

Steve's Ice Cream depicted in Dan Mazur's "Seafood Sundae" from Leftovers of the Living Dead (Fat Cat Funnies, 2010).

Steve's Ice Cream was an ice cream brand which began as an ice-cream parlor chain owned by Steve Herrell. He opened his first establishment at 191 Elm Street in Somerville, Massachusetts in 1973. Known as the Original Steve's Ice Cream, the business introduced the concept of super-premium ice cream and customized ice cream desserts using the mix-in.

== History ==
Herrell graduated from the University of Maryland at College Park in 1967 with a degree in sociology. In 1973, he mechanically altered a small-batch commercial freezer to produce an extraordinarily rich, creamy, low-air ice cream, and he founded Steve's Ice Cream to sell the new ice cream at his store. Herrell was introduced to the Heath Bar candy bar by a friend in the late 1960s, and felt it would make an excellent addition to his ice cream. Instead of having pre-mixed flavors like chocolate chip at his store, he had his staff mix freshly made ice cream with candy or other confections based upon customer requests. These candy additions were called "mix-ins", and the custom-blended flavors proved to be a success with customers.

In 1975, Steve's charged $.35 and $.55 for cones, with an additional $.10 for each "mix-in" of M&M's, Heath bars and others. A fruit mix-in was another $.10. While waiting in line, customers could pay a dime to rent a piano roll for the store's player piano which Steve had rebuilt.

In 1977, Herrell sold his company for $80,000 to Joe Crugnale, the future founder of the Bertucci's restaurant chain. The company was again sold in 1983. For several years the chain was co-located with the D'Angelo sub chain until D'Angelo was purchased by Yum! Brands in 1993, and Steve's franchises were replaced by Pizza Hut.

Steve's began selling pre-packaged ice cream in various grocery stores, which caused friction with franchise owners and Steve's corporate office in the late 1980s. Franchise owners felt they were being undercut by making the Steve's brand available in grocery stores. Additionally, they argued that the sale of prepackaged ice cream bearing the "Steve's" name was inconsistent with the concept that Steve's was a premium, handmade ice cream. Some franchise owners refused to continue paying franchise fees. A number of franchisees were forced to go out of business, which contributed to the company's demise, and the company closed in the late 1990s.

In 1980, Herrell opened up a new ice cream business, Herrell's Ice Cream, which is still in existence. He stepped down as a day-to-day operator in 2014, and it is now owned and run by his ex-wife.

== The "Mix-In" ==
Steve's trademarked the term "mix-in", which forced competitors to use other terms. The mix-in consisted of candies or other ingredients blended into the ice cream to order. The popularity of the Heath Bar mix-in, created by Steve's and later used at other chains, prompted the Heath company to expand its operation to include a commercial foods division. Later chains took the concept of the mix-in and applied it to their operations, creating a whole new industry around it.

The business concept at Steve's inspired other chains, such as Cold Stone Creamery and Amy's Ice Creams, and products like the Dairy Queen Blizzard and Wendy's Twisted Frosty product lines. MSNBC travel/leisure journalist Tom Austin credits Herrell for this innovative milestone in the ice cream industry: "Modern gourmet ice cream is widely considered to have been born at the original Steve's in Boston."

Steve has been credited with inspiring the founders of Ben & Jerry's Ice Cream, whose original store, which opened in 1978, also included – like Steve's – a freezer to churn the ice cream, and a player piano. A photo of Steve, Ben and Jerry hangs on the wall of Herrell's Northampton, Massachusetts store.

== Brand revival of Steve's Ice Cream ==
The Steve's Ice Cream brand was acquired by David Stein in 2009, a former employee of Steve's when the company was owned by Integrated Resources in the 1980s. The new Brooklyn-based Steve's Ice Cream was launched in 2011 with the distribution of packaged ice cream (with guar gum added) plus stores located in Manhattan and Brooklyn. David Stein and The Fresh Ice Cream Co. – which was doing business as Steve's Ice Cream – filed for bankruptcy in February 2017, and was purchased by Dean Foods Company of Dallas, Texas in June 2017. As of July 2021, Dean Foods does not show Steve's Ice Cream as one of the brands on its website.

== See also ==
- Marble Slab Creamery
