= Vriner's Confectionery =

- U.S. National Register of Historic Places
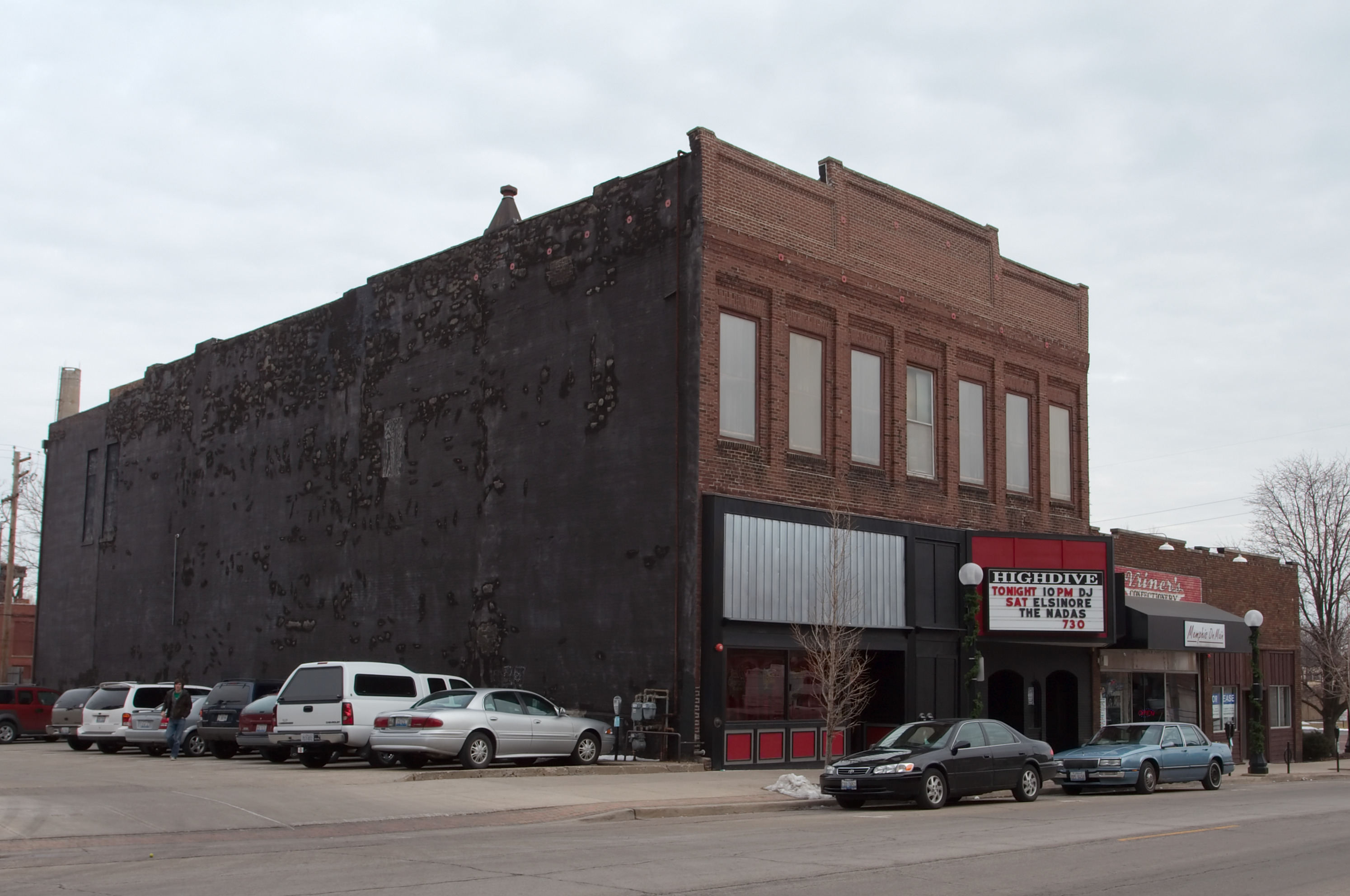

- Location within Illinois Location within the United States
- Location: 55 Main St., Champaign, Illinois
- Coordinates: 40°7′3″N 88°14′27″W
- Area: less than one acre
- Built: 1890
- NRHP reference No.: 83000305
- Added to NRHP: May 9, 1983

Vriner's Confectionery is a historic confectionery store located at 55 Main Street in Champaign, Illinois.

== History ==
The building was constructed in 1890 as a clothing store; Vriner's opened in the building in 1898. One of five or six candy shops operating in Champaign at the turn of the century, Vriner's was the longest-lived. The shop was located next to a vaudeville theater and near Champaign's railroad station, and it became popular with patrons of both. The store also led to an influx of Greek immigrants to Champaign, as Vriner's promised jobs to many of the new immigrants.

The building was added to the National Register of Historic Places on May 9, 1983. The confectionery store closed in 1997; while the Vriner family still makes candy, they no longer have a permanent storefront. A country bar now occupies the building.
