= Jolly Rancher =

American brand of confectionery

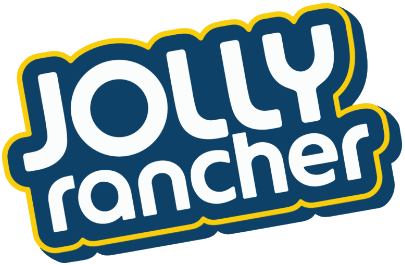

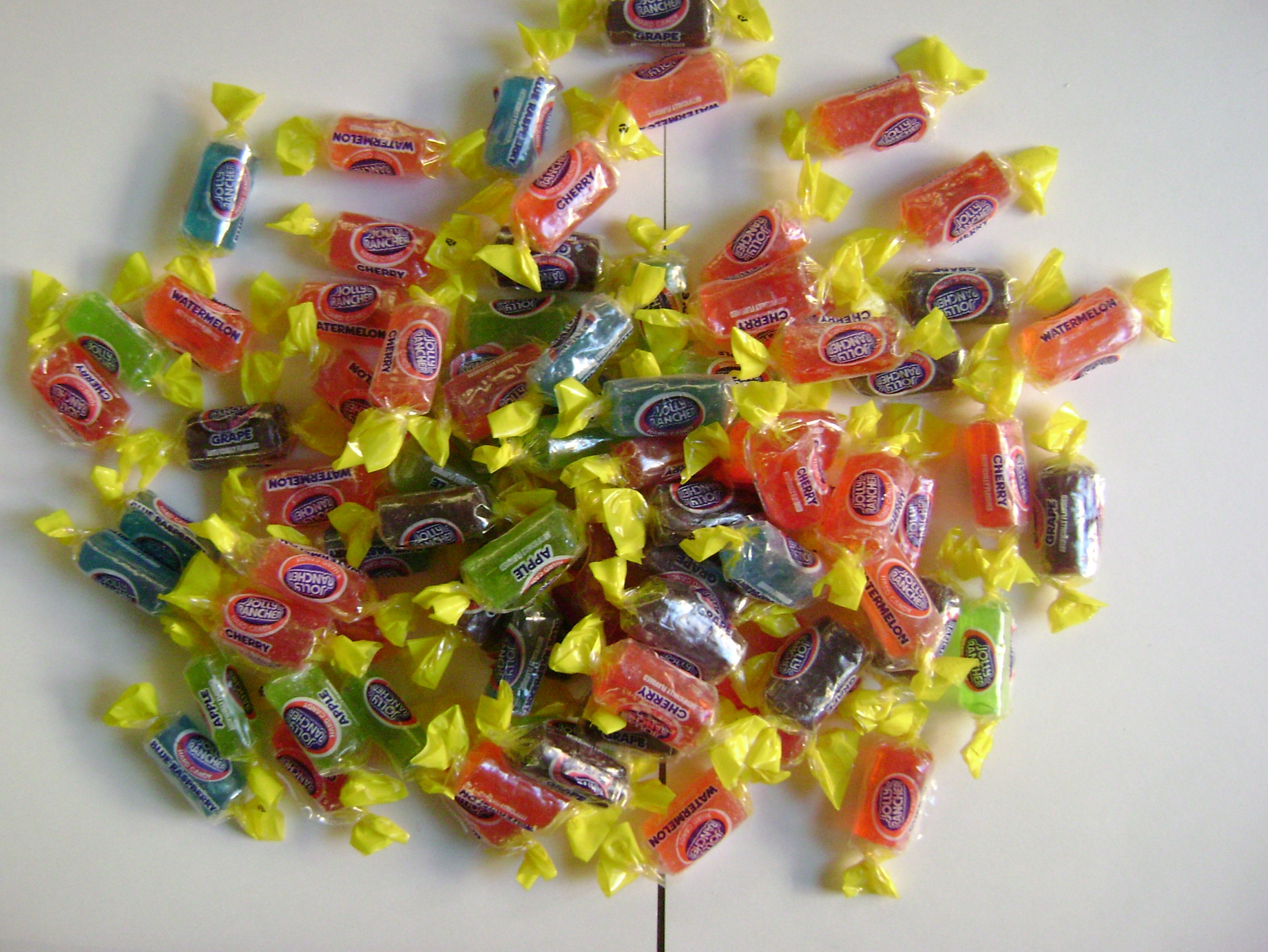
- Assorted flavors of Jolly Rancher hard candies
- Product type: Fruit flavored hard candy
- Current owner: Highlander Partners, L.P.
- Produced by: The Hershey Company
- Country: United States
- Introduced: November 22, 1949; 76 years ago
- Markets: United States
- Previous owners: Jolly Rancher Company; Beatrice Foods; Leaf, Inc.
- Tagline: Time for A Flavor Ride; Keep On Sucking
- Website: hersheyland.com/jolly-rancher

Jolly Rancher is an American brand of sweet hard candy, gummies, jelly beans, lollipops, and sour bites, and a line of soda put out by Elizabeth Beverage Company in 2004. Originally created in Colorado in the 1950s, the Jolly Rancher brand has been owned by the Hershey Company since 1996.

== History ==
Bill and Dorothy Harmsen founded the Jolly Rancher Company in 1949, choosing the name to give the impression of a friendly Western company, and opened their first Jolly Rancher Ice Cream Store in Golden, Colorado, on May 28, 1949. Finding that ice cream was hard to sell in the cold winter months, they added a line of bulk and boxed chocolate that was provided by a small candy firm in the Denver area. Jolly Rancher Company opened a number of franchise stores in Colorado, Wyoming and Nebraska and provided both chocolate candies and a five cent hot cinnamon taffy stick that proved to be very popular. It was this candy's popularity that caused Jolly Rancher Company to expand its hard candy line.

Jolly Rancher filed for a trademark for Jolly Rancher as a word mark on March 31, 1958, and received registration number 0695762 for that trademark on April 5, 1960. The first use in commerce for that Jolly Rancher word mark was noted in the filing as being June 1, 1960.

In 1966, Jolly Rancher Company was sold to Beatrice Foods, although Bill Harmsen continued to operate the business. In 1983, Leaf, Inc. acquired a number of candy brands from Beatrice, Jolly Rancher included. In October 1996, the Hershey Company agreed to purchase the North American confectionery brands of Leaf, Inc. which included Jolly Rancher, Whoppers, Milk Duds, Good & Plenty, PayDay and Heath bar. As part of the transaction, Hershey agreed to sell most of its European candy operations to Huhtamäki Oyj, Leaf's parent company.

In 2002, Hershey closed the Arvada, Colorado, plant and moved the manufacturing of the candy to Mexico to save costs.

In 2014, Hershey acquired Ontario-based company The Allan Candy Co. and moved the manufacturing of the candy exclusively to the Granby plant, in Quebec, Canada.

== Flavors ==
Jolly Rancher's original flavors were watermelon, apple, and fire stix. Individually-wrapped candies followed soon after in the same three flavors. Later, they introduced cherry, orange, tangerine, lemon, grape, peach, and sour apple. Eventually, blue raspberry replaced lemon. Current flavors include cherry, blue raspberry, grape, green apple, and watermelon. There are also sour, cinnamon, and smoothie varieties. In 2013, lemon was reintroduced in an all-lemon bag. In 2015, Jolly Rancher offered a "Fruity Bash" variety bag, which included strawberry, mountain berry, lemon, orange, and pineapple. In 2017, Jolly Rancher offered a "Hotties" variety bag, which included watermelon & cayenne pepper, blue raspberry & sriracha, cherry & habanero, and green apple & ginger. In 2020, Jolly Rancher offered a tropical variety bag featuring fruit punch, golden pineapple, lime, and mango flavors. They also offer a "red" bag, which includes cherry, watermelon, strawberry and fruit punch. As of 2012, the passion mix, which included the peach flavor, and the wild berry mix were discontinued by the Hershey Company. The Hotties mix was discontinued in 2019. In 2020, the peach flavor was brought back in an "all-peach" bag and replaced the mountain berry flavor in the Fruity Bash bag.

== Product variations ==
Jolly Rancher Hard Candy Product Variations
Product	Description	Sizes	Ingredients	Nutrition Value	Year Introduced
Jolly Rancher Hard Candy	A sweet hard candy, mostly defined by fruity flavors made of amorphous solids and formed from highly concentrated sugar solutions giving them a crystallized, glassy appearance.	assorted bags with individually wrapped pieces	corn syrup, sugar, contains 2% or less of: malic acid, natural flavor, artificial flavor, artificial colorants: Red 40, Blue 1, Yellow 5, Yellow 6, mineral oil, lecithin	Jolly Rancher Hard Candy, Original Flavors Nutritional value per 100 g (3.5 oz): Energy: 292.88 kJ (70.00 kcal); Carbohydrates: 17g; Sugars: 11g; Dietary fibre: 0g; Fat: 0g; Saturated: 0g; Trans: 0g; Protein: 0g Vitamins and minerals; Vitamins / Quantity %DV^{†}; Vitamin D / 0% 0.0 μg; Minerals / Quantity %DV^{†}; Calcium / 0% 1.2 mg; Iron / 0% 0.0 mg; Potassium / 0% 0.0 mg; Sodium / 0% 10 mg; Amounts converted and rounded to be relative to 18 g serving or 3 pieces.; ^{†}Percentages estimated using US recommendations for adults, except for potassium, which is estimated based on expert recommendation from the National Academies. Source: []	1949
Jolly Rancher Fruit ‘N’ Sour	A hard candy with both fruit flavors and sour mixed together including Wild Strawberry, Green Apple, Watermelon, Cherry and Blue Raspberry.	assorted bags with individually wrapped pieces	Corn Syrup, Sugar, Malic Acid, contains 2% or less of: Natural Flavor, Artificial Flavor, Artificial Color: Red 40, Blue 1, Yellow 5, Yellow 6, Mineral Oil, Lecithin	Jolly Rancher Hard Candy, Fruit & Sour Flavors Nutritional value per 100 g (3.5 oz): Energy: 251.04 kJ (60.00 kcal); Carbohydrates: 16g; Sugars: 11g; Dietary fibre: 0g; Fat: 0g; Saturated: 0g; Trans: 0g; Protein: 0g Vitamins and minerals; Vitamins / Quantity %DV^{†}; Vitamin D / 0% 0.0 μg; Minerals / Quantity %DV^{†}; Calcium / 0% 1 mg; Iron / 0% 0.0 mg; Potassium / 0% 0.0 mg; Sodium / 0% 0 mg; Amounts converted and rounded to be relative to 18 g serving or 3 pieces.; ^{†}Percentages estimated using US recommendations for adults, except for potassium, which is estimated based on expert recommendation from the National Academies.	2004
Jolly Rancher Cinnamon Fire	A hard candy with cinnamon spice flavor	assorted bags with individually wrapped pieces	Corn Syrup, Sugar, contains 2% or less of: Natural Flavor, Artificial Flavor, Artificial Color: Red 40, Mineral Oil, Lecithin	Jolly Rancher Hard Candy Cinnamon Fire Nutritional value per 100 g (3.5 oz): Energy: 292.88 kJ (70.00 kcal); Carbohydrates: 17g; Sugars: 12g; Dietary fibre: 0g; Fat: 0g; Saturated: 0g; Trans: 0g; Protein: 0g Vitamins and minerals; Vitamins / Quantity %DV^{†}; Vitamin D / 0% 0.0 μg; Minerals / Quantity %DV^{†}; Calcium / 0% 1.0 mg; Iron / 0% 0.0 mg; Potassium / 0% 0.0 mg; Sodium / 0% 0 mg; Amounts converted and rounded to be relative to 18g serving or 3 pieces.; ^{†}Percentages estimated using US recommendations for adults, except for potassium, which is estimated based on expert recommendation from the National Academies. Source: [ ]	
Jolly Rancher Fruity Bash	The Jolly Rancher Fruity Bash assortment consists of lemon, mountain berry, strawberry, pineapple, orange flavored hard candies.	assorted bags with individually wrapped pieces	Corn Syrup, Sugar, Malic Acid, contains 2% or less of: Natural Flavor, Artificial Flavor, Artificial Color: Red 40, Yellow 6, Blue 1, Yellow 5, Mineral Oil, Lecithin	Jolly Rancher Hard Candy Fruit Bash Flavors Nutritional value per 100 g (3.5 oz): Energy: 292.88 kJ (70.00 kcal); Carbohydrates: 17g; Sugars: 11g; Dietary fibre: 0g; Fat: 0g; Saturated: 0g; Trans: 0g; Protein: 0g Vitamins and minerals; Vitamins / Quantity %DV^{†}; Vitamin D / 0% 0.0 μg; Minerals / Quantity %DV^{†}; Calcium / 0% 1.0 mg; Iron / 0% 0.0 mg; Potassium / 0% 0.0 mg; Sodium / 0% 0 mg; Amounts converted and rounded to be relative to 18g serving or 3 pieces.; ^{†}Percentages estimated using US recommendations for adults, except for potassium, which is estimated based on expert recommendation from the National Academies.	2015
Jolly Rancher Lollipop	Jolly Rancher Lollipops are a hard candy on a stick. Each assorted bag comes with cherry lollipops, watermelon lollipops, green apple lollipops, pink lemonade lollipops.	assorted bags with individually wrapped pieces	Corn Syrup, Sugar, Malic Acid, Contains 2% or less of: Sodium Lactate, Natural Flavor, Artificial Flavor, Artificial Color: Red 40, Yellow 5, Blue 1, Yellow 6. Lecithin, BHT	Jolly Rancher Lollipops Original Flavors Nutritional value per 100 g (3.5 oz): Energy: 251.04 kJ (60.00 kcal); Carbohydrates: 16g; Sugars: 13g; Dietary fibre: 0g; Fat: 0g; Saturated: 0g; Trans: 0g; Protein: 0g; Vitamins: Quantity %DV^{†}; Vitamin D: 0% 0.0 μg; Minerals: Quantity %DV^{†}; Calcium: 0% 0.8 mg; Iron: 0% 0.0 mg; Potassium: 0% 0.0 mg; Sodium: 1% 15 mg; Amounts converted and rounded to be relative to 17g serving or 1 piece.; ^{†}Percentages estimated using US recommendations for adults, except for potassium, which is estimated based on expert recommendation from the National Academies.	1999
Jolly Rancher Sugar Free Hard Candy	Jolly Rancher Sugar Free Hard Candy is a variation of the traditional Jolly Rancher hard candies, but with zero sugar. Jolly Rancher Sugar Free Hard Candy comes in watermelon, grape, apple, and raspberry flavors.	standard 3.6 oz; 2.75 oz	Isomalt, Polyglycitol Syrup, Contains 2% or less of: Malic Acid, Natural Flavor, Artificial Flavor, Acesulfame Potassium, Artificial Color: Red 40, Yellow 5, Blue 1, Yellow 6. Mineral Oil, Lecithin	Jolly Rancher Sugar Free Hard Candy Nutritional value per 100 g (3.5 oz): Energy: 146.44 kJ (35.00 kcal); Carbohydrates: 15g; Sugars: 0g; Dietary fibre: 0g; Fat: 0g; Saturated: 0g; Trans: 0g; Protein: 0g; Vitamins: Quantity %DV^{†}; Vitamin D: 0% 0.0 μg; Minerals: Quantity %DV^{†}; Calcium: 0% 0.0 mg; Iron: 0% 0.0 mg; Potassium: 0% 0.0 mg; Sodium: 0% 0 mg; Amounts converted and rounded to be relative to 16g serving or 4 pieces.; ^{†}Percentages estimated using US recommendations for adults, except for potassium, which is estimated based on expert recommendation from the National Academies.	2003
Jolly Rancher Awesome Reds Hard Candy	Jolly Rancher Awesome Reds Hard Candy is an assortment variation including only the popular red candy flavors. Flavors include cherry, watermelon, strawberry, fruit punch.	assorted bags with individually wrapped pieces	Corn Syrup, Sugar, Contains 2% or Less of: Malic Acid, Pectin, Natural Flavor, Artificial Flavor, Artificial Color: Red 40, Yellow 6, Blue 1. Mineral Oil, Lecithin	Jolly Rancher Awesome Reds Hard Candy Nutritional value per 100 g (3.5 oz): Energy: 292.88 kJ (70.00 kcal); Carbohydrates: 17g; Sugars: 11g; Dietary fibre: 0g; Fat: 0g; Saturated: 0g; Trans: 0g; Protein: 0g Vitamins and minerals; Vitamins / Quantity %DV^{†}; Vitamin D / 0% 0.0 μg; Minerals / Quantity %DV^{†}; Calcium / 0% 1.2 mg; Iron / 0% 0.0 mg; Potassium / 0% 0.0 mg; Sodium / 0% 10 mg; Amounts converted and rounded to be relative to 18g serving or 3 pieces.; ^{†}Percentages estimated using US recommendations for adults, except for potassium, which is estimated based on expert recommendation from the National Academies.	
Jolly Rancher Hard Candy Sour Surge	Jolly Rancher Hard Candy with a sour powdered center. Flavors include green apple, watermelon, blue raspberry.	standard 1.5 oz	Corn Syrup, Sugar, Malic Acid, Contains 2% or Less of: Natural Flavor, Artificial Flavor, Sodium Lactate, Baking Soda, Tricalcium Phosphate, Maltodextrin, Artificial Color: Red 40, Yellow 5, Blue 1, Yellow 6. Mineral Oil, Lecithin	Jolly Rancher Hard Candy Sour Surge Flavors Nutritional value per 100 g (3.5 oz): Energy: 251.04 kJ (60.00 kcal); Carbohydrates: 14g; Sugars: 10g; Dietary fibre: 0g; Fat: 0g; Saturated: 0g; Trans: 0g; Protein: 0g Vitamins and minerals; Vitamins / Quantity %DV^{†}; Vitamin D / 0% 0.0 μg; Minerals / Quantity %DV^{†}; Calcium / 0% 1.0 mg; Iron / 0% 0.0 mg; Potassium / 0% 0.0 mg; Sodium / 0% 10 mg; Amounts converted and rounded to be relative to 16g serving or 4 pieces.; ^{†}Percentages estimated using US recommendations for adults, except for potassium, which is estimated based on expert recommendation from the National Academies.	
Jolly Rancher Holiday Candy Canes	Jolly Rancher Holiday Candy Canes are candy cane shaped treats made in the original Jolly Rancher Hard Candy flavors like Blue Raspberry, Cherry and Green Apple.	standard 5.28 oz; 13 oz King Sized; 3.5 oz; 1.55 oz minis	Corn Syrup, Sugar, Contains 2% or Less of: Malic Acid, Natural Flavor, Artificial Flavor, Sodium Lactate, Artificial Color: Red 40, Yellow 5, Blue 1, Glycerin, Lecithin	Jolly Rancher Candy Canes Nutritional value per 100 g (3.5 oz): Energy: 188.28 kJ (45.00 kcal); Carbohydrates: 12g; Sugars: 9g; Dietary fibre: 0g; Fat: 0g; Saturated: 0g; Trans: 0g; Protein: 0g; Vitamins: Quantity %DV^{†}; Vitamin D: 0% 0.0 μg; Minerals: Quantity %DV^{†}; Calcium: 0% 0.0 mg; Potassium: 0% 0.0 mg; Sodium: 0% 10 mg; Amounts converted and rounded to be relative to 12g serving or 1 piece.; ^{†}Percentages estimated using US recommendations for adults, except for potassium, which is estimated based on expert recommendation from the National Academies.	
Jolly Rancher Tropical Hard Candy	Jolly Rancher Tropical Hard Candy delivers tropical fruit flavors with a blend of fruit punch, golden pineapple, lime, pear and mango flavors.	assorted bags with individually wrapped pieces	Corn Syrup, Sugar, Contains 2% or Less of: Malic Acid, Natural Flavor, Artificial Flavor, Mineral Oil, Lecithin, Artificial Color: Red 40, Yellow 5, Blue 1, Yellow 6	Nutritional value per 100 g (3.5 oz): Energy: 292.88 kJ (70.00 kcal); Carbohydrates: 17g; Sugars: 11g; Dietary fibre: 0g; Fat: 0g; Saturated: 0g; Trans: 0g; Protein: 0g; Vitamins: Quantity %DV^{†}; Vitamin D: 0% 0.0 μg; Minerals: Quantity %DV^{†}; Calcium: 0% 0.0 mg; Iron: 0% 0.0 mg; Potassium: 0% 0.0 mg; Sodium: 0% 0 mg; Amounts converted and rounded to be relative to 18 g serving or 3 pieces.; ^{†}Percentages estimated using US recommendations for adults, except for potassium, which is estimated based on expert recommendation from the National Academies.	
Jolly Rancher Watermelon Hard Candy	Jolly Rancher Watermelon Hard Candy is a package of just the original Watermelon hard candy fruit flavor.	box of individually wrapped pieces	Corn Syrup, Sugar, Contains 2% or Less of: Malic Acid, Natural Flavor, Artificial Flavor, Mineral Oil, Lecithin, Artificial Color: Red 40, Yellow 6.	Jolly Rancher Watermelon Hard Candy Nutritional value per 100 g (3.5 oz): Energy: 292.88 kJ (70.00 kcal); Carbohydrates: 17g; Sugars: 11g; Dietary fibre: 0g; Fat: 0g; Saturated: 0g; Trans: 0g; Protein: 0g Vitamins and minerals; Vitamins / Quantity %DV^{†}; Vitamin D / 0% 0.0 μg; Minerals / Quantity %DV^{†}; Calcium / 0% 1.0 mg; Iron / 0% 0.0 mg; Potassium / 0% 0.0 mg; Sodium / 0% 0 mg; Amounts converted and rounded to be relative to 18 g serving or 3 pieces.; ^{†}Percentages estimated using US recommendations for adults, except for potassium, which is estimated based on expert recommendation from the National Academies.	2020

Jolly Rancher Chewy or Gummy Candy Product Variations
Product	Description	Sizes	Ingredients	Nutrition Value	Year Introduced
Jolly Rancher Chews	A variation on consistency from a traditional Jolly Rancher hard candy, the Jolly Rancher Chews are a chewy candy made in various fruity flavors. Individually wrapped in assorted bags, flavors include cherry, blue raspberry, watermelon, green apple, strawberry.	assorted bags with individually wrapped pieces	Corn Syrup, Sugar, Malic Acid, contains 2% or less of: Natural Flavor, Artificial Flavor, Artificial Color: Red 40, Yellow 6, Blue 1, Yellow 5, Mineral Oil, Lecithin	Jolly Rancher Chews Nutritional value per 100 g (3.5 oz): Energy: 669.44 kJ (160.00 kcal); Carbohydrates: 36g; Sugars: 27g; Dietary fibre: 0g; Fat: 2g; Saturated: 1g; Trans: 0g; Protein: 0g Vitamins and minerals; Vitamins / Quantity %DV^{†}; Vitamin D / 0% 0.0 μg; Minerals / Quantity %DV^{†}; Calcium / 0% 2.0 mg; Iron / 0% 0.0 mg; Potassium / 0% 0.0 mg; Sodium / 1% 20 mg; Amounts converted and rounded to be relative to 41g serving or 9 pieces.; ^{†}Percentages estimated using US recommendations for adults, except for potassium, which is estimated based on expert recommendation from the National Academies.	2001
Jolly Rancher Awesome Twosome Chewy Candy	Jolly Rancher Awesome Twosome Chews are intended to provide the consumer with two flavors in one bite. These bite-sized chewy candies have a sugar-coating on the outside flavor, with a tangy second flavor on the inside. There are two flavor combinations in each bag: cherry-orange pieces and watermelon-green apple pieces.	assorted bags of bite-sized pieces	Corn Syrup, Sugar, Enriched Wheat Flour, Flour, Niacin, Ferrous Sulfate, Thiamin Mononitrate, Riboflavin, Folic Acid, Vegetable Oil, Palm Kernel Oil, Palm Oil, Contains 2% or less of: Citric Acid, Modified Potato Starch, Glyceryl Monostearate, Natural Flavor, Artificial Flavor, Sodium Lactate, Cornstarch, Tartaric Acid, Glycerin, Lecithin, Soybean Oil, Salt, Artificial Color: Red 40, Yellow 6, Yellow 5, Blue 1, Carrageenan, Potassium Sorbate (Preservative)	Jolly Rancher Awesome Twosome Chews Nutritional value per 100 g (3.5 oz): Energy: 585.76 kJ (140.00 kcal); Carbohydrates: 31g; Sugars: 22g; Dietary fibre: 0g; Fat: 2g; Saturated: 1.4g; Trans: 0g; Protein: <1g Vitamins and minerals; Minerals / Quantity %DV^{†}; Calcium / 0% 1.5 mg; Iron / 1% 0.2 mg; Potassium / 0% 13.4 mg; Sodium / 2% 35 mg; Amounts converted and rounded to be relative to 39g serving or 13 pieces.; ^{†}Percentages estimated using US recommendations for adults, except for potassium, which is estimated based on expert recommendation from the National Academies.	2010
Jolly Rancher Jelly Beans	Jolly Rancher Jelly Beans are a soft, chewy variation of the traditional Jolly Rancher hard candies, made to look like a classic jelly bean in size and shape. Jolly Rancher Jelly Bean flavors include strawberry, orange, blue raspberry, watermelon, grape, green apple.	standard 14 oz; 10 oz cartons	Corn Syrup, Sugar, Cornstarch, Contains 2% or less of: Sodium Lactate, Lactic Acid, Malic Acid, Natural Flavor, Artificial Flavor, Gum Acacia, Limonene, Mineral Oil, Carnauba Wax, Artificial Color: Red 40, Yellow 5, Blue 1, Yellow 6	Jolly Rancher Jelly Beans Original Flavors Nutritional value per 100 g (3.5 oz): Energy: 418.4 kJ (100.0 kcal); Carbohydrates: 26g; Sugars: 18g; Dietary fibre: 0g; Fat: 0g; Saturated: 0g; Trans: 0g; Protein: 0g; Vitamins: Quantity %DV^{†}; Vitamin D: 0% 0.0 μg; Minerals: Quantity %DV^{†}; Calcium: 0% 0.0 mg; Iron: 0% 0.0 mg; Potassium: 1% 20.0 mg; Sodium: 2% 45 mg; Amounts converted and rounded to be relative to 31g serving or 23 pieces.; ^{†}Percentages estimated using US recommendations for adults, except for potassium, which is estimated based on expert recommendation from the National Academies.	1997
Jolly Rancher Wild Berry Jelly Beans	Small bean-shaped candies with a hard exterior shell and soft inside. Jolly Rancher Wild Berry Jelly Beans are made in flavors like wild strawberry, blue raspberry, mountain berry, strawberry watermelon, and raspberry lemonade.	assorted bags or cartons with bite-sized pieces	Corn Syrup, Sugar, Cornstarch contains 2% or less of: Sodium Lactate, Lactic Acid Malic Acid, Natural Flavor, Artificial Flavor, Gum Acacia, Limonene, Carnauba Wax, Mineral Oil, Artificial Color: Red 40, Blue 1, Yellow 5, Yellow 6	Jolly Rancher Jelly Beans Wild Berry Nutritional value per 100 g (3.5 oz): Energy: 460.24 kJ (110.00 kcal); Carbohydrates: 28g; Sugars: 20g; Dietary fibre: 0g; Fat: 0g; Saturated: 0g; Trans: 0g; Protein: 0g; Vitamins: Quantity %DV^{†}; Vitamin D: 0% 0.0 μg; Minerals: Quantity %DV^{†}; Calcium: 0% 0.0 mg; Iron: 0% 0.0 mg; Potassium: 1% 20.0 mg; Sodium: 2% 50 mg; Amounts converted and rounded to be relative to 31g serving or 23 pieces.; ^{†}Percentages estimated using US recommendations for adults, except for potassium, which is estimated based on expert recommendation from the National Academies. Source: []	2005
Jolly Rancher Misfit Two-in-One Gummies	Jolly Rancher Misfit Two-in-One Gummies combine Jolly Rancher fruit flavors. Flavor combinations include green apple and cherry, blue raspberry and watermelon, strawberry and lemon.	standard 3.15 oz; 3.4 oz King Sized; 6.3 oz Heart Shaped Valentine’s Box	Corn Syrup, Sugar, Malic Acid, Contains 2% or Less of: Natural Flavor, Artificial Flavor, Sodium Lactate, Baking Soda, Tricalcium Phosphate, Maltodextrin, Artificial Color: Red 40, Yellow 5, Blue 1, Yellow 6. Mineral Oil, Lecithin.	Jolly Rancher Misfits Two-in-One Gummies Nutritional value per 100 g (3.5 oz): Energy: 376.56 kJ (90.00 kcal); Carbohydrates: 23g; Sugars: 17g; Dietary fibre: 0g; Fat: 0g; Saturated: 0g; Trans: 0g; Protein: 0g; Vitamins: Quantity %DV^{†}; Vitamin D: 0% 0.0 μg; Minerals: Quantity %DV^{†}; Calcium: 0% 0.0 mg; Iron: 0% 0.0 mg; Potassium: 0% 0.0 mg; Sodium: 1% 30 mg; Amounts converted and rounded to be relative to 28g serving or 5 pieces.; ^{†}Percentages estimated using US recommendations for adults, except for potassium, which is estimated based on expert recommendation from the National Academies. Source: []	2019
Jolly Rancher Bites	Jolly Rancher Bites are chewy fruit candies with an inner filling. These fruit-filled gummies consist of a chewy outer layer with a liquid filling. Jolly Rancher Bites flavors include watermelon, cherry, green apple.	standard 10 oz; 2 oz	Corn Syrup, Sugar, Gelatin, Modified Food Starch, Contains 2% or Less of: Malic Acid, Pectin, Natural Flavor, Artificial Flavor, Coconut Oil, Sodium Citrate, Carnauba Wax, Artificial Color: Red 40, Yellow 5, Blue 1	Jolly Rancher Filled Gummies Bites Nutritional value per 100 g (3.5 oz): Energy: 585.76 kJ (140.00 kcal); Carbohydrates: 32g; Sugars: 22g; Dietary fibre: 0g; Fat: 0g; Saturated: 0g; Trans: 0g; Protein: 2g Vitamins and minerals; Minerals / Quantity %DV^{†}; Calcium / 0% 0.9 mg; Iron / 0% 0.0 mg; Potassium / 0% 0.0 mg; Sodium / 1% 25 mg; Amounts converted and rounded to be relative to 42g serving or 11 pieces.; ^{†}Percentages estimated using US recommendations for adults, except for potassium, which is estimated based on expert recommendation from the National Academies.	2003
Jolly Rancher Original Gummies Candy	A chewy gummy candy created in the same original fruit flavors of the Jolly Rancher Hard Candies like cherry, green apple, grape, blue raspberry and watermelon.	standard 5 oz	Corn Syrup, Sugar, Modified Cornstarch Contains 2% or Less of: Malic Acid, Natural Flavor, Artificial Flavor, Sodium Citrate, Mineral Oil, Carnauba Wax, Limonene Artificial Color: Red 40, Yellow 5, Blue 1, Yellow 6	Jolly Rancher Gummies Candy Nutritional value per 100 g (3.5 oz): Energy: 418.4 kJ (100.0 kcal); Carbohydrates: 25g; Sugars: 18g; Dietary fibre: 0g; Fat: 0g; Saturated: 0g; Trans: 0g; Protein: 0g; Vitamins: Quantity %DV^{†}; Vitamin D: 0% 0.0 μg; Minerals: Quantity %DV^{†}; Calcium: 0% 0.0 mg; Iron: 0% 0.0 mg; Potassium: 0% 0.0 mg; Sodium: 2% 35 mg; Amounts converted and rounded to be relative to 18g serving or 3 pieces.; ^{†}Percentages estimated using US recommendations for adults, except for potassium, which is estimated based on expert recommendation from the National Academies.	
Jolly Rancher Sour Gummies Candy	A Jolly Rancher Gummy Candy with a sour sugar coating on the outside	standard 5 oz; small 4.5 oz	Corn Syrup, Sugar, Modified Cornstarch, Malic Acid Contains 2% or Less of: Natural Flavor, Artificial Flavor, Sodium Citrate, Citric Acid, Artificial Color: Red 40, Yellow 5, Blue 1, Yellow 6	Jolly Ranchers Sour Gummies Nutritional value per 100 g (3.5 oz): Energy: 460.24 kJ (110.00 kcal); Carbohydrates: 27g; Sugars: 20g; Dietary fibre: 0g; Fat: 0g; Saturated: 0g; Trans: 0g; Protein: 0g; Vitamins: Quantity %DV^{†}; Vitamin D: 0% 0.0 μg; Minerals: Quantity %DV^{†}; Calcium: 0% 0.0 mg; Iron: 0% 0.0 mg; Potassium: 0% 0.0 mg; Sodium: 1% 30 mg; Amounts converted and rounded to be relative to 18 g serving or 3 pieces.; ^{†}Percentages estimated using US recommendations for adults, except for potassium, which is estimated based on expert recommendation from the National Academies. Source: []	
Jolly Rancher Jelly Hearts	Jolly Rancher Valentine's Day Jelly Hearts are heart-shaped jelly beans that come in cherry, strawberry and watermelon flavors. The heart-shaped jelly beans have a hard exterior shell and soft gel interior.	11 oz bag	Sugar, Corn Syrup, Modified Cornstarch, Contains 2% or less of: Cornstarch, Citric Acid, Artificial Flavor, Sodium Citrate, Mineral Oil, Carnauba Wax, Confectioner's Glaze, Artificial Color: Red 40, Beeswax.	Jolly Rancher Jelly Hearts Nutritional value per 100 g (3.5 oz): Energy: 460.24 kJ (110.00 kcal); Carbohydrates: 28g; Sugars: 22g; Dietary fibre: 0g; Fat: 0g; Saturated: 0g; Trans: 0g; Protein: 0g; Vitamins: Quantity %DV^{†}; Vitamin D: 0% 0.0 μg; Minerals: Quantity %DV^{†}; Calcium: 0% 0.0 mg; Iron: 0% 0.0 mg; Potassium: 0% 0.0 mg; Sodium: 0% 5 mg; Amounts converted and rounded to be relative to 30g serving or 11 pieces.; ^{†}Percentages estimated using US recommendations for adults, except for potassium, which is estimated based on expert recommendation from the National Academies. Source: []	

== Chemistry ==
Jolly Ranchers are amorphous solids, meaning their molecular arrangements have no specific pattern. They are hard, brittle, rigid, translucent and have low molecular mobility. Jolly Ranchers are formed from highly concentrated sugar solutions (greater than 95% sugar) and have extremely high viscosity. Their "glassy" appearance is a result of the way they are processed. During processing, the sugar syrup is cooled so rapidly that no crystals have time to form. Jolly Ranchers hold their solid shape when kept in temperatures less than the glass transition temperature (T_{g}). If the temperature is greater than the T_{g}, the hard and glassy-like structure of the Jolly Rancher becomes a soft and rubbery material.

== Manufacturing ==
Jolly Ranchers are manufactured by creating a solution of corn syrup, sucrose, glucose, or fructose syrup that is boiled to a temperature of 160 °C (320 °F) and cooled to create a supersaturated mixture that is roughly 2.5 percent water. As the mixture is cooled, natural and artificial flavoring and artificial colors are added to individual batches of syrup solution, which are later mixed with malic acid to improve shelf life and add further flavor. Once the mixture begins to cool, it is then extruded into long malleable strings that are cut to size, individually wrapped and packaged.
