= Amy's Ice Creams =

Chain of ice cream shops

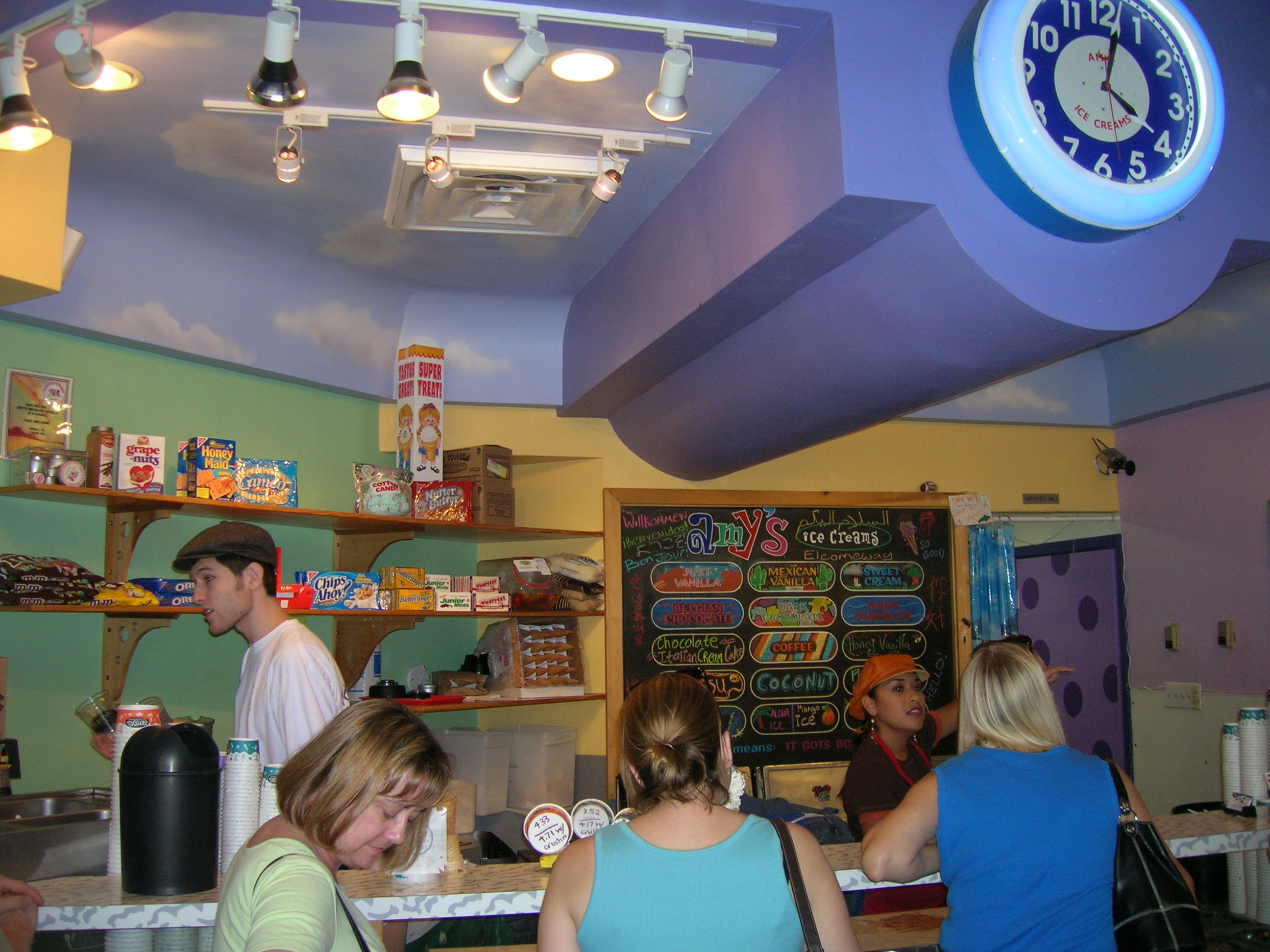
Interior of Amy's Ice Creams at its Austin Arboretum location.

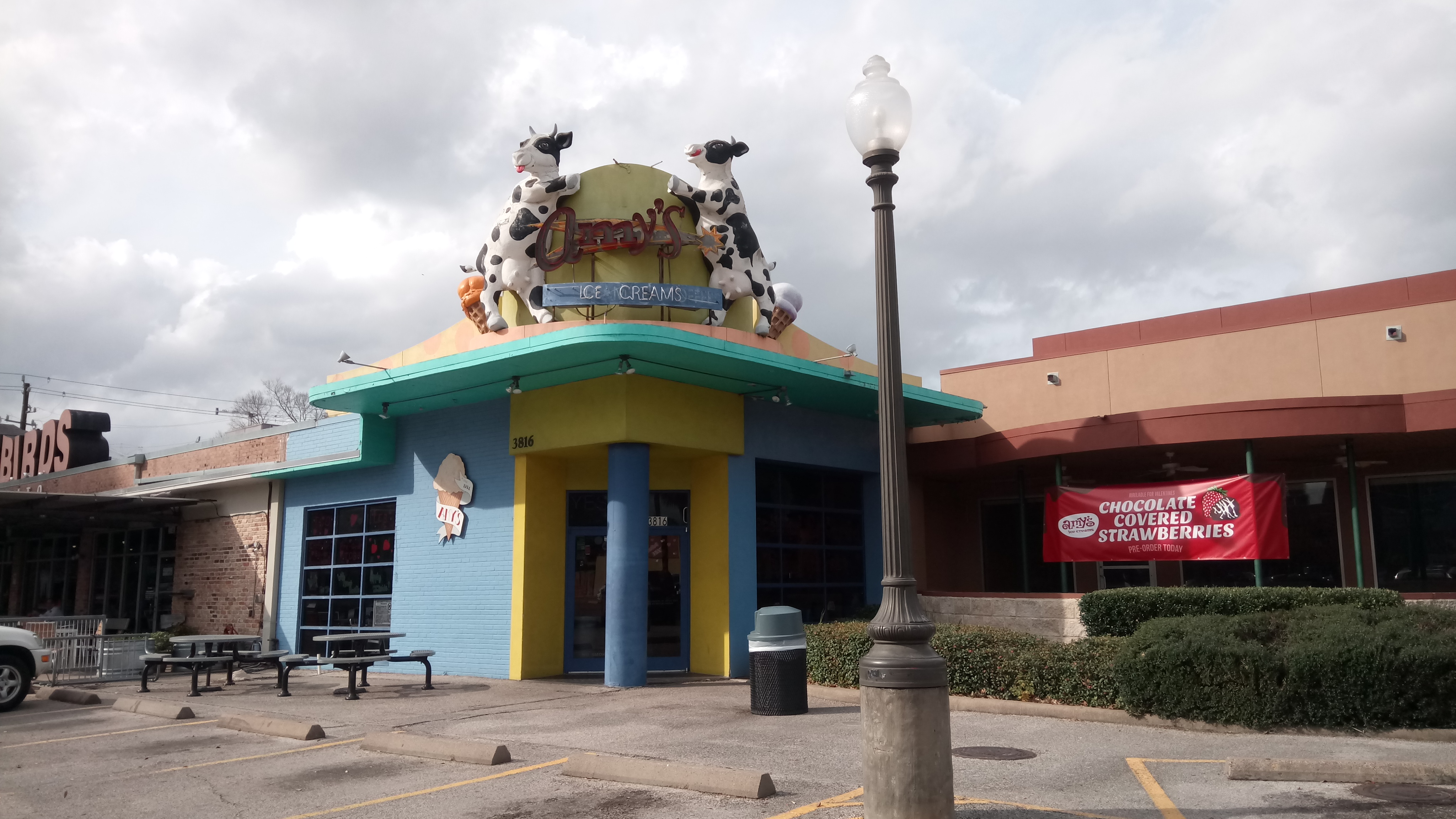
Amy's Ice Creams in Upper Kirby, Houston

Amy's Ice Creams is a privately owned chain of ice cream shops in Texas with headquarters in Austin. The Austin Chronicle described Amy's as a "quintessentially Austin institution" which "dominates the local ice cream scene." Amy's ice cream is owned by Amy Simmons. The readers of the Austin Chronicle have voted Amy's the best "reader's ice cream" eight consecutive years.

== History ==
Known colloquially as Amy's, Amy's Ice Creams was started by Amy Simmons in 1984. While in Boston, as a premedical major at Tufts University, Amy worked for Steve's Ice Cream. After Steve's Ice Cream was purchased by a larger corporation, Amy decided to go into business for herself. Amy and her business partner Scott Shaw eventually decided to open their ice cream shop in Austin. They wrote a check for the lease of their first store on Guadalupe Street in Austin. Amy has since opened fourteen more locations, with the majority of them in Austin, two in Houston, and one in San Antonio.

The first Houston location was formerly at The Rice Hotel.

In 2009, owner Amy Simmons stated that she does not intend to rapidly expand the chain.

In 2017, the company reported a $9 million revenue.
