= Wacky Wafers =

Brand name of candy

Wacky Wafers are a candy sold by Leaf Brands, LLC. They are shaped about the size of an American half dollar coin and come in five flavors: banana, green apple, watermelon, orange, and strawberry. Sold in a clear plastic wrapper, you can see the long strip of multi-colored and flavored Wacky Wafers inside.

Before being purchased by Leaf, they were part of The Willy Wonka Candy Company line available in the United States. Wacky Wafers started with four flavors, then began to advertise a "NEW GREEN APPLE!" After green apple's introduction, other flavors followed, including pineapple, cherry, grape, and blue raspberry, among others. They started out like the product by Leaf Brands (their original incarnation), but later, they were produced in a smaller version similar to the current Bottle Caps in a box filled with the miniature fruit-flavored snacks. Their final incarnation before their discontinuation completely scrapped the wafer concept, instead making them shaped similar to Flintstones vitamins. Wacky Wafers were discontinued as part of the regular product line when Nestlé purchased the Willy Wonka brand, but they were reintroduced in 2017 by Leaf Brands, LLC.

The original candy company for Wacky Wafers (& Bottle Caps) was Breaker Confections in Itasca Illinois, a far west suburb of Chicago. Breaker confection licensed the "Willy Wonka" name so it could be used as a merchandising tie-in for the movie. In 1980, Breaker Confections changed its name to Willy Wonka Brands. Nestlé then bought the company eight years later, in 1988.

== See also ==
- List of confectionery brands
