= Whoppers =

Malted milk balls made by Hershey's

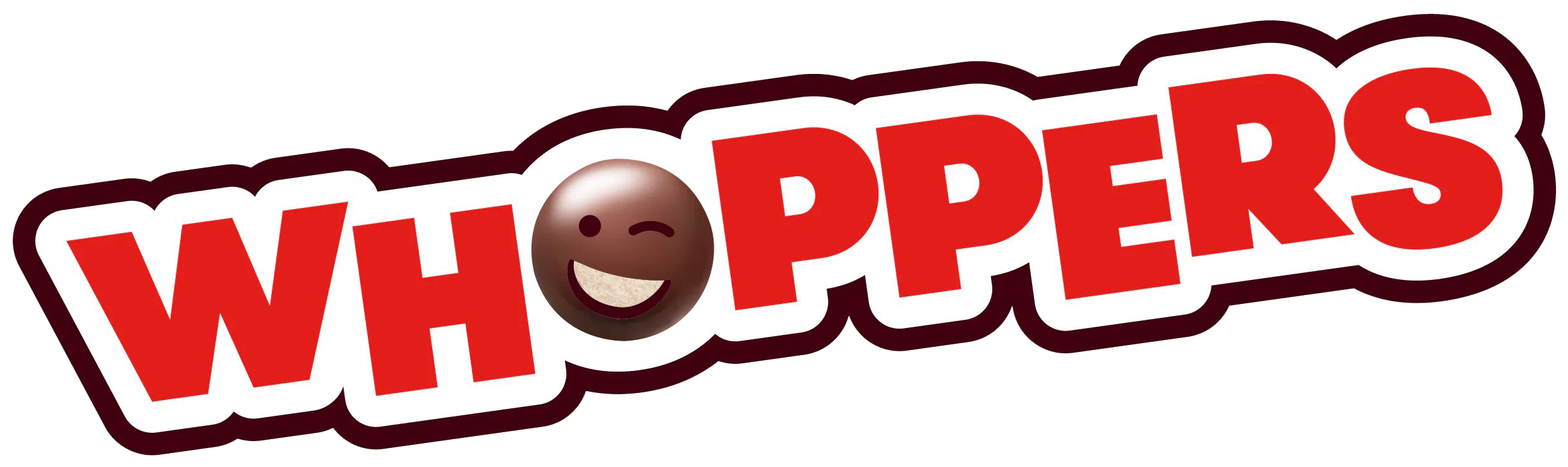

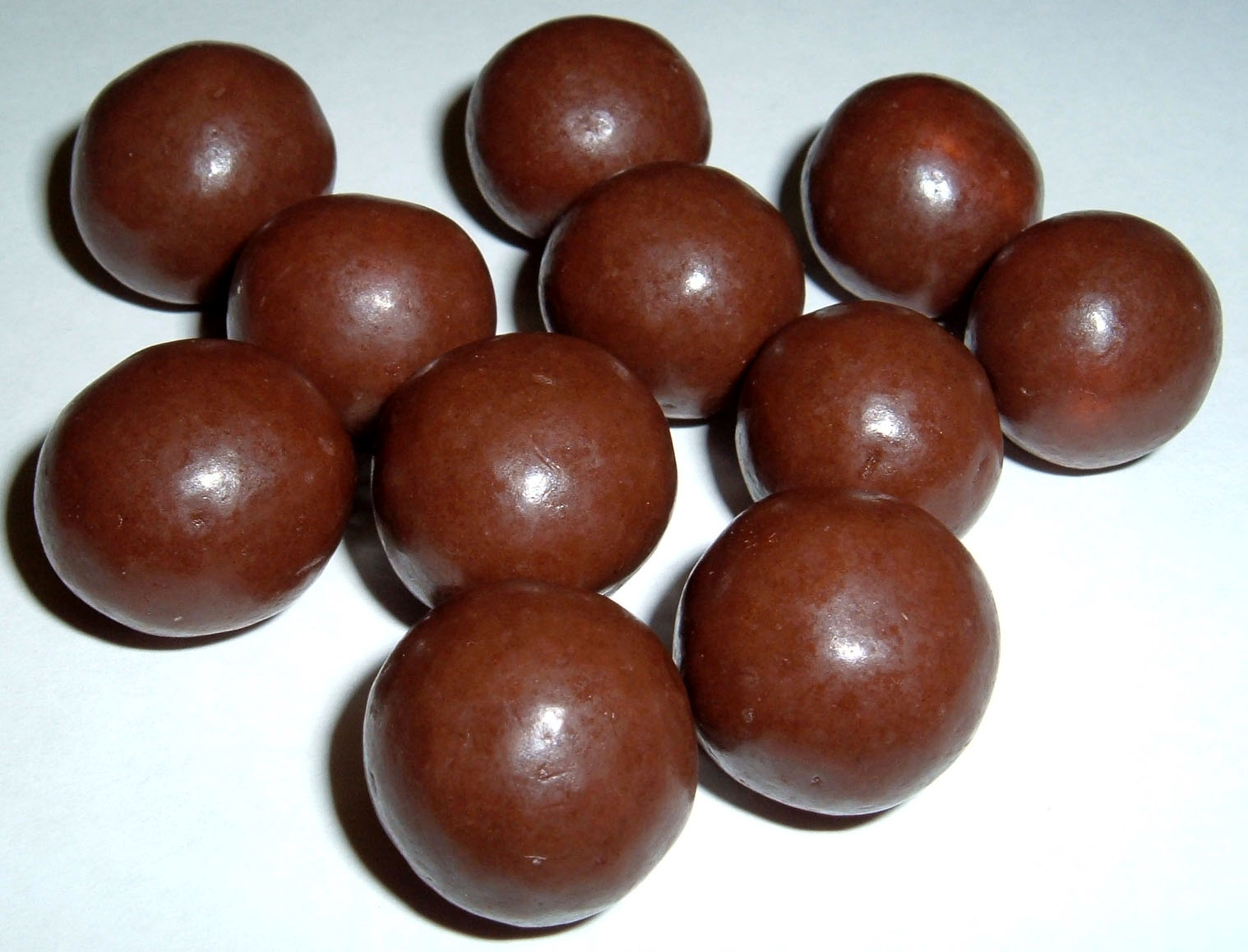
- Product type: Confectionery
- Current owner: Iconic IP Interests, LLC
- Produced by: Hershey (1996–present)
- Country: United States
- Introduced: December 15, 1949; 76 years ago
- Markets: Global
- Previous owners: Leaf Brands (1949–96)
- Tagline: "The Original Malted Milk Balls" (Worldwide)
- Website: hersheyland.com/whoppers

Whoppers are malted milk balls, with an artificially flavored "non chocolate coating", produced by the Hershey Company. The candy is a sphere about 3/4 inch (20 mm) in diameter and consists of a malted milk center formed through an aeration process, a technique commonly used in mid-20th century confectionery.

The candy was initially sold unwrapped at two pieces for one cent. After the creation of cellophane wrapping machines, smaller Whoppers were packaged and sold five for one cent, also known as Fivesomes. Leaf soon introduced the first confectionery milk-carton package, which would become a hallmark of the candy.

== History ==
In 1939, the Overland Candy Company introduced the predecessor to Whoppers, a malted milk candy called "Giants". In 1947, Overland merged with Chicago Biscuit Company, Leaf Gum, and Laf Machinery. Leaf Brands reintroduced malted milk balls under the Whoppers name in December 1949.

In 1967, Leaf was purchased by W. R. Grace. The Leaf Confectionary unit was sold back to its management in 1976. Leaf was again purchased by Huhtamäki Oyj in 1983 and merged with General Mills' bubble gum division and Beatrice Foods Company's candy operations.

During the early 1990s, Whopper production was moved from Chicago to Robinson, Illinois. Leaf's 60-year-old factory on the Near North Side officially closed in 1993. In 1996, Hershey Foods Corporation paid $440 million to acquire the Leaf North America confectionery operations from Huhtamäki. Hershey then began licensing the company's brands, including Whoppers.

In 2018, Huhtamäki sold the intellectual property rights of 10 brands, including Whoppers, to Highlander Partners.

There are seasonal variants for Christmas and Easter - Sno-Balls and Mini Robin Eggs. Both are covered with a hard candy shell.

In 2000, Hershey introduced Mini Whoppers. Traditionally chocolate in flavor, a new strawberry milkshake flavored variant became available in 2006. Soon after, they also released Reese's Peanut Butter Cups flavored Whoppers (discontinued sometime between 2014 and 2015). For Easter 2009, three new milkshake flavors were released: vanilla, blueberry, and orange cream. The vanilla variant was reintroduced in 2016 as a seasonal product.

== Ingredients ==
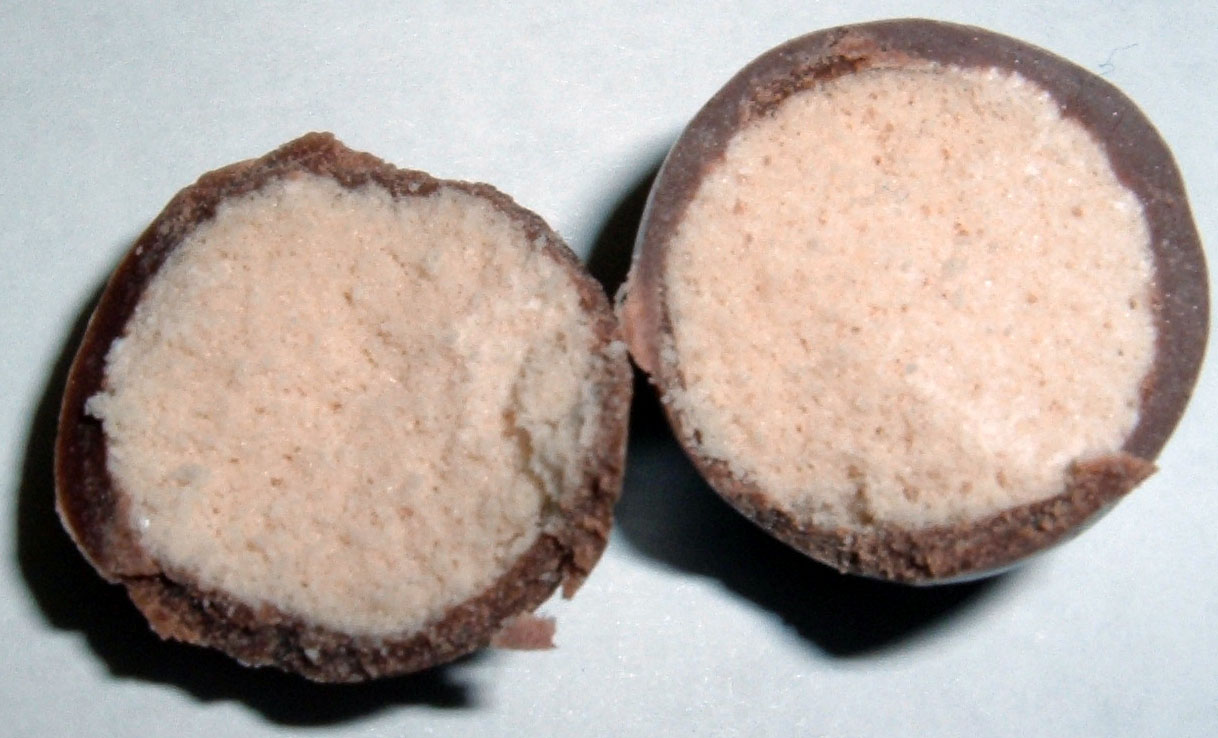
Opened Whoppers

Listed in decreasing order by weight: sugar, corn syrup, partially hydrogenated palm kernel oil, whey (milk), malted milk (barley malt, wheat flour, milk, salt, sodium bicarbonate), cocoa, 2% or less of: resinous glaze, sorbitan tristearate, soy lecithin, salt, natural and artificial flavors, calcium carbonate, tapioca dextrin.

== Similar products ==
- Maltesers
