= Milk Duds =

Brand of caramel and cocoa confectionery

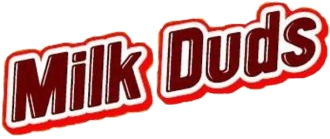

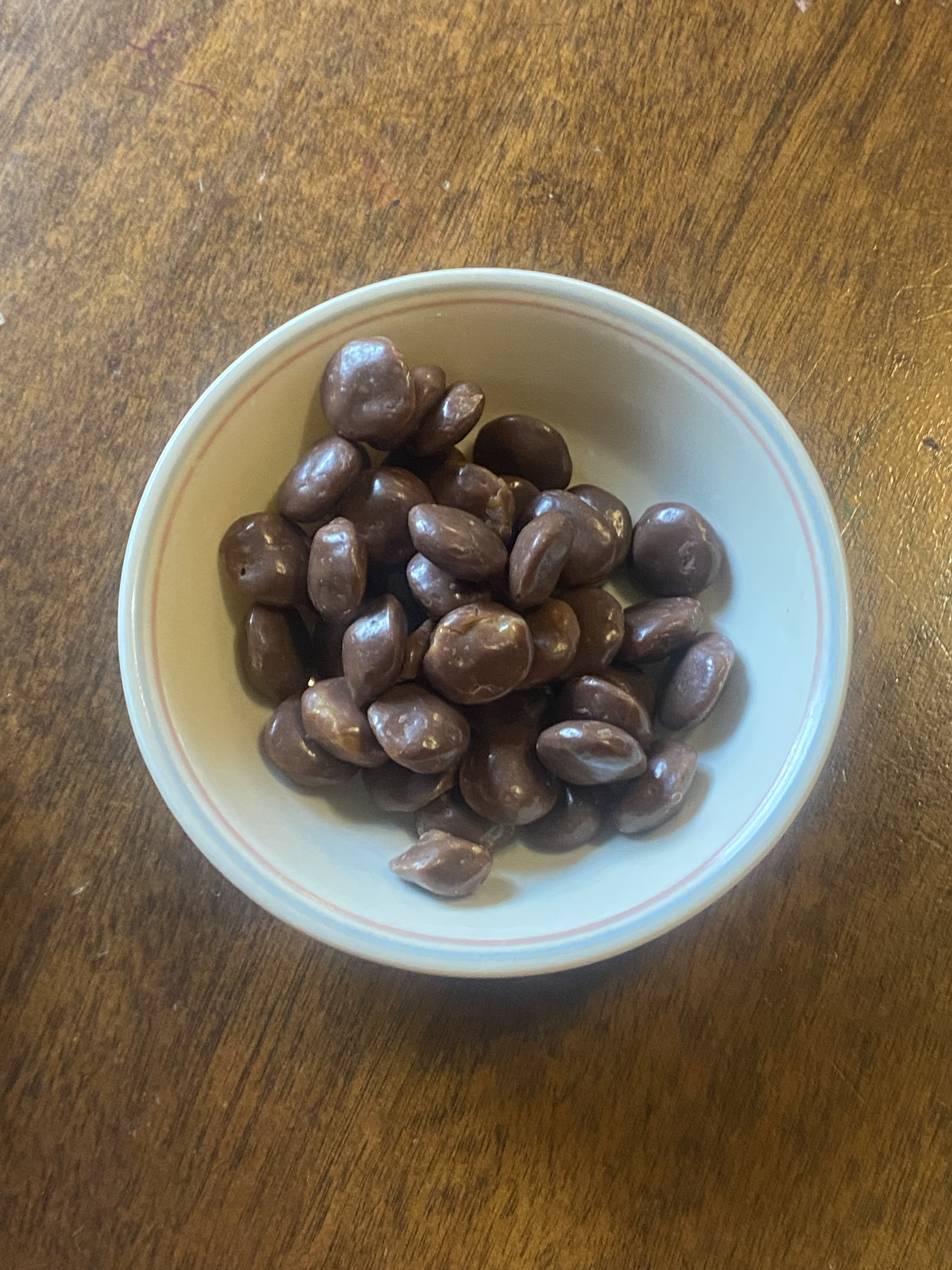
- Milk Duds inside a bowl
- Product type: Candy
- Current owner: Highlander Partners / Iconic IP Interests
- Produced by: The Hershey Company
- Country: United States
- Introduced: 1928; 98 years ago
- Markets: Worldwide
- Previous owners: F. Hoffman & Co.; Milton J. Holloway; Beatrice Foods; Leaf International
- Ambassadors: M. J. Holloway & Co.
- Tagline: Chocolatey, Caramely, and Rich with Milk; Chewy. Not Gooey.
- Website: hersheyland.com/milk-duds

Milk Duds are a brand of candies made with chocolate, created in 1928 by F. Hoffman and Company of Chicago and now produced and marketed by the Hershey Company under license from Highlander Partners, a Dallas-based global private equity firm.

The candy, sold in a golden-yellow theatre-style box, is an irregularly shaped caramel disk with a confectionery chocolate coating of chocolate and vegetable oil.

At its original naming, according to Hershey, "milk" referred to the product's initial milk ingredient, and "dud" referred to failed attempts to create a spherical shape. Another telling has "duds" meaning fancy.

Milk Duds
Nutritional value per 100 g (3.5 oz)
- Energy: 1,823 kJ (436 kcal)
- Carbohydrates: 71.8 g
- Sugars: 51.3 g
- Dietary fibre: 0 g
- Fat: 15.4 g
- Saturated: 9 g
- Trans: 0 g
- Protein: 2.6 g
Vitamins and minerals
Vitamins	Quantity %DV^{†}
Vitamin A equiv.	0% 0 μg
Vitamin C	0% 0 mg
Minerals	Quantity %DV^{†}
Calcium	8% 102.6 mg
Iron	0% 0 mg
Sodium	11% 256.4 mg
- Amounts converted and rounded to be relative to 100 g serving. Hershey's listed serving size is 39 g or 13 pieces (above amounts are ~2.5641 servings or ~33 pieces).
- ^{†}Percentages estimated using US recommendations for adults. Source: MILK DUDS candy - Hershey's

== History ==
In 1928, F. Hoffman and Company of Chicago manufactured a spherical, chocolate-covered caramel candy called Milk Duds. In the same year, Milton J. Holloway took over F. Hoffman and Company and the production of Milk Duds. The candy proved popular during the Great Depression due to their inexpensive price.

In 1960, Holloway sold the business to Beatrice Foods for $1.25 million. Milk Duds were named the official candy of Major League Baseball Players Association in 1971. The candy made notable appearances in the 1980 films Seems Like Old Times and The Formula.

In 1983, Huhtamäki purchased the confectionary businesses of Beatrice and Leaf, taking control of Milk Duds production. At the time, 32.5 million candies were being produced each week. In 1992, production of Milk Duds candy was moved to Leaf's plant in Robinson, Illinois.

In 1996, Hershey Foods Corporation spent $440 million to acquire Leaf's North American confectionery operation. At this time, Hershey began paying royalties for Leaf's brand names, including Milk Duds. In return, the company sold its European candy lines to Huhtamäki for $110 million.

In 2018, Huhtamäki sold ownership of Milk Duds to Highlander Partners, who licenses the candy to Hershey.

== Ingredients ==
In 2008, the Hershey Company eliminated the recipe's relatively expensive cocoa butter, substituting cheaper oils in order to retain its then current price. There is also no milk in the new recipe, having been replaced with VersiLac (a dairy solids solution) in order to be more profitable.

Hershey's changed the description of the product and altered the packaging slightly, along with the ingredients. According to United States Food and Drug Administration food labeling laws, a chocolate-flavored coating that does not contain cocoa butter cannot legally be described as milk chocolate and are instead described as "chocolate candy," as having "chocolate coating" or as "candy made with chocolate and caramel."

2024 ingredients

Corn Syrup
Sugar
Vegetable Oil (one or more of the following)

Palm Oil
Shea Oil
Sunflower Oil
Palm Kernel Oil
Safflower Oil

Dextrose
Nonfat Milk
Reduced Protein Whey
Chocolate
Contains 2% or Less of:

Brown sugar
Mono and Diglycerides
Whey
Baking Soda
Confectioner’s Glaze
Salt
Tapioca Dextrin
Lecithin
Vanillin (artificial flavoring)

== See also ==
- List of chocolate-covered foods
- Bridge Mixture
